= Gallium(III) oxalate =

Names
- Other names Gallium oxalate

Identifiers
CAS Number	70764-38-4
3D model (JSmol)	Interactive image
ChemSpider	9661318
PubChem CID	11486500
- InChI: InChI=1S/3C2H2O4.2Ga/c3*3-1(4)2(5)6;;/h3*(H,3,4)(H,5,6);;/q;;;2*+3/p-6 Key: ZQRQYJUNUBTDRF-UHFFFAOYSA-H
- SMILES: C(=O)(C(=O)[O-])[O-].C(=O)(C(=O)[O-])[O-].C(=O)(C(=O)[O-])[O-].[Ga+3].[Ga+3]

Properties
Chemical formula	Ga_{2}(C_{2}O_{4})_{3}
Molar mass	403.50 g/mol
Appearance	White solid
Solubility in water	Sparingly soluble in water
- Except where otherwise noted, data are given for materials in their standard state (at 25 °C [77 °F], 100 kPa). Infobox references

Gallium(III) oxalate is an inorganic compound of gallium and the oxalate ion, with the formula Ga_{2}(C_{2}O_{4})_{3}. It is a white solid that is only slightly soluble in water.

== Preparation ==
Hydrated gallium(III) oxalate can be prepared by reacting an aqueous gallium(III) salt with oxalic acid. A tetrahydrate has been reported from hot solutions of gallium nitrate and oxalic acid.

== Properties ==
=== Solubility and complex formation ===
Gallium(III) oxalate is sparingly soluble in water.

Gallium(III) also forms soluble oxalato complexes in solution. Species such as [Ga(C_{2}O_{4})_{2}]^{−} and [Ga(C_{2}O_{4})_{3}]^{3−} have been reported, and gallium generally has a greater tendency than aluminium to form such oxalate complexes.

=== Hydrothermal decomposition ===
Under hydrothermal conditions, gallium oxalate can decompose to gallium oxide hydroxide, GaOOH. Treatment at about 175 °C has been used to produce α-GaOOH, with the oxalate acting as the gallium precursor.

The overall conversion may be represented as:

Ga_{2}(C_{2}O_{4})_{3} + H_{2}O → 2 GaOOH + 2 CO_{2} + 4 CO

Further heating of GaOOH gives gallium oxide.
