= Uranium borohydride =

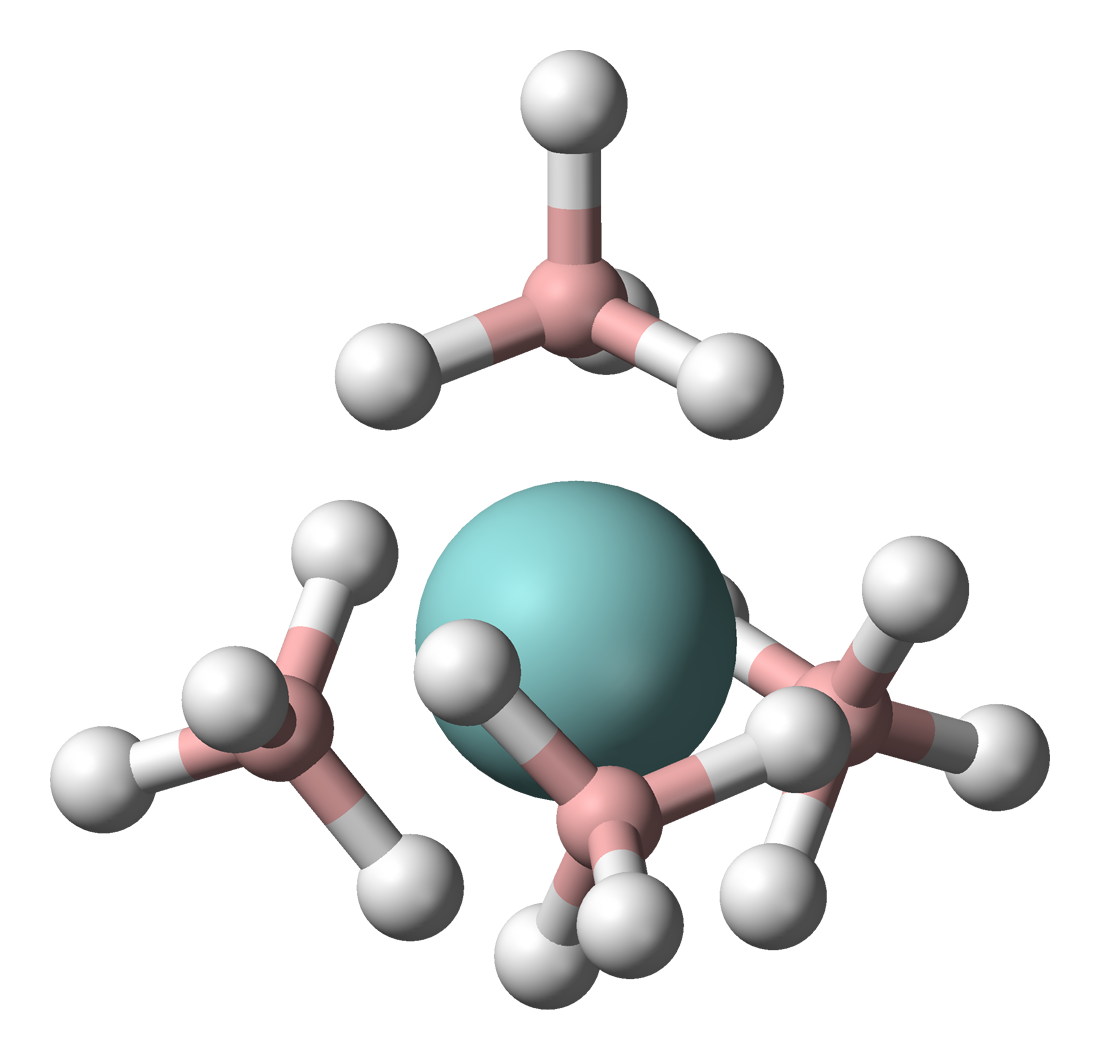
- Uranium borohydride

Identifiers
| CAS Number | 12523-77-2 |
| 3D model (JSmol) | Interactive image |
| PubChem CID | 135046781 |
- InChI: InChI=1S/2BH5.U/h2*1H5;/q2*-1;+2 Key: KUMAXXHQRVBPEC-UHFFFAOYSA-N; InChI=1/2BH5.U/h2*1H5;/q2*-1;+2 Key: KUMAXXHQRVBPEC-UHFFFAOYAW
- SMILES: [BH4-].[BH4-].[U+4].[BH4-].[BH4-]

Properties
| Chemical formula | U(BH_{4})_{4} |
| Molar mass | 297.27 g/mol |
| Solubility in other solvents | Decomposes |
- Except where otherwise noted, data are given for materials in their standard state (at 25 °C [77 °F], 100 kPa). verify (what is ?) Infobox references

Uranium borohydride is the inorganic compound with the empirical formula U(BH_{4})_{4}. Two polymeric forms are known, as well as a monomeric derivative that exists in the gas phase. Because the polymers convert to the gaseous form at mild temperatures, uranium borohydride once attracted much attention. It is solid green.

== Structure ==
Solid uranium borohydride is a polymer that has a 14-coordinate structure with two tridentate terminal groups and four bidentate bridging groups. The polymer cracks readily to give a homoleptic 12-coordinate coordination complex, with four κ^{3}-BH_{4}^{−} ligands, which envelop the metal, conferring volatility.

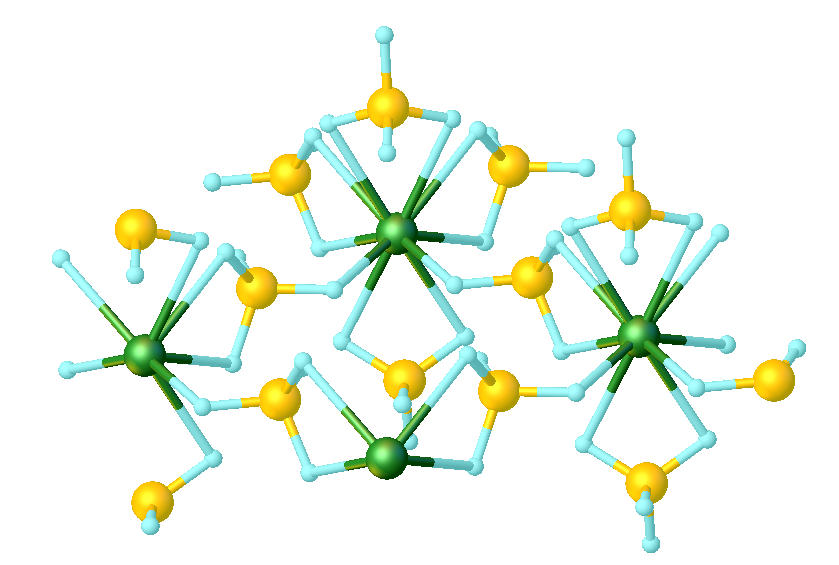
Ball-and-stick model of one of two forms of polymeric U(BH_{4})_{4}.

== Preparation ==
This compound was first prepared by treating uranium tetrafluoride with aluminium borohydride:

UF_{4} + 2 Al(BH_{4})_{3} → U(BH_{4})_{4} + 2 Al(BH_{4})F_{2}

It may also be prepared by the solid-state reaction of uranium tetrachloride with lithium borohydride:

UCl_{4} + 4 LiBH_{4} → U(BH_{4})_{4} + 4 LiCl

Although solid U(BH_{4})_{4} is a polymer, it undergoes cracking, converting to the monomer. The related methylborohydride complex U(BH_{3}CH_{3})_{4} is monomeric as a solid and hence more volatile.

== History ==
During the Manhattan Project, the need arose to find volatile compounds of uranium suitable for use in the diffusion separation of uranium isotopes. Uranium borohydride is, after uranium hexafluoride, the most volatile compound of uranium known with a vapor pressure of 4 mmHg (530 Pa) at 60 °C. Uranium borohydride was discovered by Hermann Irving Schlesinger and Herbert C. Brown, who also discovered sodium borohydride.

Uranium hexafluoride is corrosive, which led to serious consideration of the borohydride. However, by the time the synthesis method was finalized, the problems related to uranium hexafluoride were solved. Borohydrides are nonideal ligands for isotope separations, since there are isotopes of boron that occur naturally in high abundance: ^{10}B (20%) and ^{11}B (80%), while fluorine-19 is the only isotope of fluorine that occurs in nature in more than trace quantities.
