= Gallium(III) oxide =

Gallium(III) trioxide
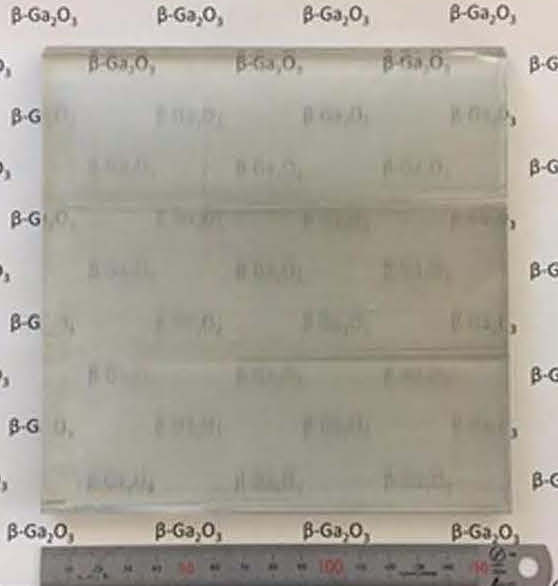
- β-Ga_{2}O_{3} crystal

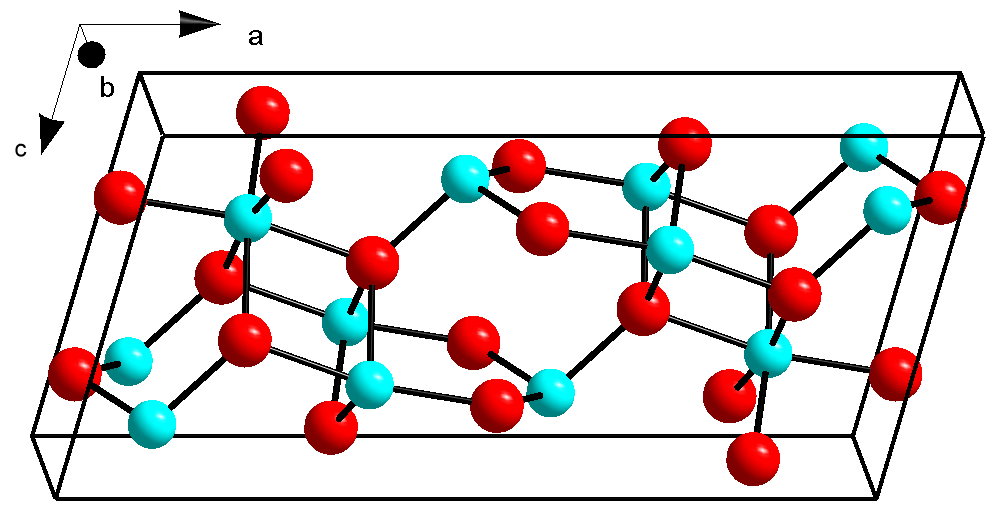
- Crystal structure of β-Ga_{2}O_{3}

Names
- Other names gallium trioxide, gallium sesquioxide

Identifiers
CAS Number	12024-21-4
3D model (JSmol)	Interactive image
ChemSpider	139522
ECHA InfoCard	100.031.525
EC Number	234-691-7
PubChem CID	5139834
RTECS number	LW9650000
UNII	46F059V66A
CompTox Dashboard (EPA)	DTXSID9031359
- InChI: InChI=1S/2Ga.3O Key: QZQVBEXLDFYHSR-UHFFFAOYSA-N; InChI=1/2Ga.3O/rGa2O3/c3-1-5-2-4 Key: QZQVBEXLDFYHSR-OGCFUIRMAC
- SMILES: O=[Ga]O[Ga]=O

Properties
Chemical formula	Ga_{2}O_{3}
Molar mass	187.444 g/mol
Appearance	white crystalline powder
Melting point	1,725 °C (3,137 °F; 1,998 K)
Solubility in water	insoluble
Solubility	soluble in most acids

Structure
Crystal structure	Monoclinic, mS20, space group = C2/m, No. 12
Lattice constant	a = 1.2232 nm, b = 0.3041 nm, c = 0.5801 nm α = 90°, β = 103.73°, γ = 90° β-phase
Formula units (Z)	4

Thermochemistry
Heat capacity (C)	92.1 J/(mol·K)
Std molar entropy (S^{⦵}_{298})	85.0 J/(mol·K)
Std enthalpy of formation (Δ_{f}H^{⦵}_{298})	−1089.1 kJ/mol
Gibbs free energy (Δ_{f}G^{⦵})	−998.3 kJ/mol
Enthalpy of fusion (Δ_{f}H^{⦵}_{fus})	100 kJ/mol
- Except where otherwise noted, data are given for materials in their standard state (at 25 °C [77 °F], 100 kPa). verify (what is ?) Infobox references

Gallium(III) oxide is an inorganic compound with the formula Ga_{2}O_{3}. An ultra-wide-bandgap semiconductor, it has been studied for applications in power electronics, phosphors, and gas sensing. The compound has several polymorphs, of which the monoclinic β-phase is the most stable.

== Preparation ==
Hydrated gallium trioxide precipitated upon neutralization of acidic or basic solution of gallium salt. Also, it is formed on heating gallium in air or by thermally decomposing gallium nitrate at 200–250 °C.

Crystalline Ga_{2}O_{3} occur in five polymorphs, α, β, γ, δ, and ε. Of these polymorphs β-Ga_{2}O_{3} is the most thermodynamically stable phase at standard temperature and pressure while α-Ga_{2}O_{3} is the most stable polymorph under high pressures.

- β-Ga_{2}O_{3} epitaxial thin films can be deposited heteroepitaxially on substrates such as sapphire, GaN, SiC, and Si, as well as homoepitaxially. For example, ALD on sapphire substrates at temperatures between 190 °C and 550 °C have been demonstrated. High-quality β-Ga_{2}O_{3} films have also been grown using techniques such as MBE, HVPE, and MOVPE (also known as MOCVD or OMVPE). HVPE is preferred for vertical power semiconductor devices due to its fast growth rate. β-Ga_{2}O_{3} epitaxial films grown by MOVPE exhibit higher electron mobilities and lower background carrier concentrations than those grown by other thin-film growth techniques.

Bulk substrates of β-Ga_{2}O_{3} can be produced, which is one of the major advantages of this material system. Bulk substrates can be produced in multiple orientations and by multiple techniques.

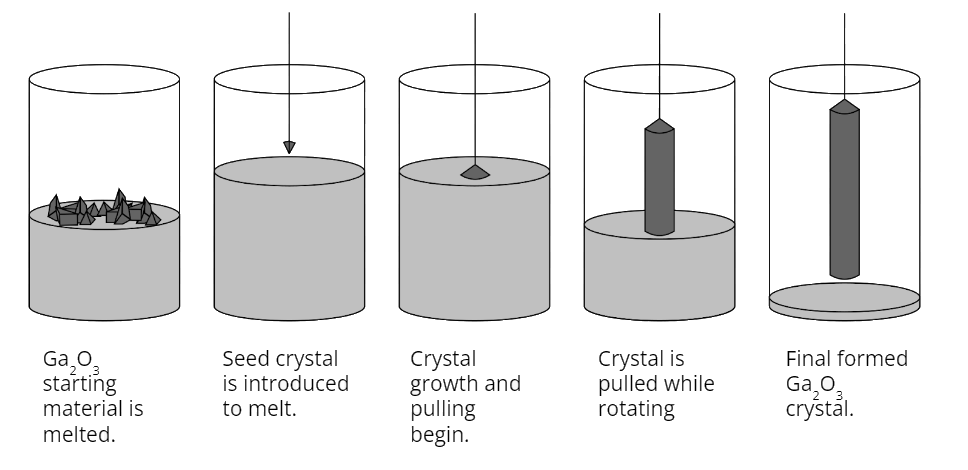
Diagram of how gallium oxide is grown by the Czochralski method

- α-Ga_{2}O_{3} can be obtained by heating β-Ga_{2}O_{3} at 65 kbar and 1100 °C. It has a corundum structure. The hydrated form can be prepared by decomposing precipitated and "aged" gallium hydroxide at 500 °C. Epitaxial thin films of α-Ga_{2}O_{3} deposited on c-plane (0001), m-plane (101̅0), or a-plane (112̅0) sapphire substrates have been demonstrated.
- γ-Ga_{2}O_{3} is prepared by rapidly heating the hydroxide gel at 400–500 °C. A more crystalline form of this polymorph can be prepared directly from gallium metal by a solvothermal synthesis.
- δ-Ga_{2}O_{3} is obtained by heating Ga(NO_{3})_{3} at 250 °C.
- ε-Ga_{2}O_{3} is prepared by heating δ-Ga_{2}O_{3} at 550 °C. Thin films of ε-Ga_{2}O_{3} are deposited by means of metalorganic vapour-phase epitaxy using trimethylgallium and water on sapphire substrates at temperatures between 550 and 650 °C

== Reactions ==
Gallium(III) trioxide is amphoteric. It reacts with alkali metal oxides at high temperature to form, e.g., NaGaO_{2}, and with Mg, Zn, Co, Ni, Cu oxides to form spinels, e.g., MgGa_{2}O_{4}. It dissolves in strong alkali to form a solution of the gallate ion, Ga(OH)^{−}_{4}.

With HCl, it forms gallium trichloride GaCl_{3}.

Ga_{2}O_{3} + 6 HCl → 2 GaCl_{3} + 3 H_{2}O

It can be reduced to gallium suboxide (gallium(I) oxide) Ga_{2}O by H_{2}. or by reaction with gallium metal:

Ga_{2}O_{3} + 2 H_{2} → Ga_{2}O + 2 H_{2}O

Ga_{2}O_{3} + 4 Ga → 3 Ga_{2}O

== Structure ==
β-Ga_{2}O_{3}, with a melting point of 1900 °C, is the most stable crystalline modification. The oxide ions are in a distorted cubic closest packing arrangement, and the gallium (III) ions occupy distorted tetrahedral and octahedral sites, with Ga–O bond distances of 1.83 and 2.00 Å respectively.

α-Ga_{2}O_{3} has the same structure (corundum) as α-Al_{2}O_{3}, wherein Ga ions are 6-coordinate.

γ-Ga_{2}O_{3} has a defect spinel structure similar to that of γ-Al_{2}O_{3}.

ε-Ga_{2}O_{3} films deposited by metalorganic vapour-phase epitaxy show a columnar structure with orthorhombic crystal symmetry. Macroscopically, this structure is seen by X-ray crystallography as hexagonal close packed.

κ-Ga_{2}O_{3} has an orthorhombic structure and forms with 120° twin domains, resulting in hexagonal symmetry which is often identified as ε-Ga_{2}O_{3}.

β-Ga_{2}O_{3} can also form alloys with alumina to yield β-(Al_{x}Ga_{1-x})O_{3.} This alloy can be used to form heterostructures and create a two-dimensional electron gas (2DEG).

Phase of Ga_{2}O_{3}	Figure	Crystal structure name
α	Crystal structure of α-Ga_{2}O_{3}	Rhombohedral (Corundum)
β	Crystal structure of β-Ga_{2}O_{3}	Monoclinic
γ	Crystal structure of γ-Ga_{2}O_{3}	Cubic defect spinel
δ	Crystal structure of δ-Ga_{2}O_{3}	Body-centered cubic bixbyite
ε	Crystal structure of ε-Ga_{2}O_{3}	Hexagonal
κ (subgroup of ε phase)	Crystal structure of κ-Ga_{2}O_{3}	Orthorhombic

== Aspirational uses ==
The β-phase's bandgap of 4.7–4.9 eV and large-area, native substrates make it a potential competitor to GaN and SiC-based power electronics applications and solar-blind UV photodetectors. The orthorhombic ĸ-Ga_{2}O_{3} is the second most stable polymorph. The ĸ-phase has shown instability of subsurface doping density under thermal exposure. Ga_{2}O_{3} exhibits reduced thermal conductivity and electron mobility by an order of magnitude compared to GaN and SiC, but is predicted to be significantly more cost-effective due to being the only wide-bandgap material capable of being grown from melt. β-Ga_{2}O_{3} is thought to be radiation-hard, which makes it promising for military and space applications. Gallium(III) oxide has been studied for usage as passive components in lasers, phosphors, and luminescent materials as well as active components for gas sensors, power diodes, and power transistors. Since the first publication in January 2012 by the National Institute of Information and Communications Technology, in collaboration with Tamura Co., Ltd. and Koha Co., Ltd. of the world's first single-crystal gallium oxide (Ga_{2}O_{3}) field-effect transistors, the predominant interest in gallium oxide is in the β-polymorph for power electronics.

Monoclinic β-Ga_{2}O_{3} has been compared with GaN- and SiC-based power devices. β-Ga_{2}O_{3} Schottky diodes have exceeded breakdown voltages of 2400 V. β-Ga_{2}O_{3}/NiO_{x} p–n diodes have exhibited breakdown voltages over 1200 V. β-Ga_{2}O_{3} MOSFETs have individually achieved figures of merits of f_{T} of 27 GHz, f_{MAX} of 48 GHz, and 5.4 MV/cm average breakdown field. This field exceeds that which is possible in SiC or GaN.

ε-Ga_{2}O_{3} thin films deposited on sapphire have been investigated as solar-blind UV photodetector.
