= Gallium(I) oxide =

Names
- Other names gallium suboxide digallium monoxide

Identifiers
CAS Number	12024-20-3
3D model (JSmol)	Interactive image
ChemSpider	34990294
PubChem CID	16702109
UNII	EJS6TG9SIN
CompTox Dashboard (EPA)	DTXSID70152747
- InChI: InChI=1S/2Ga.O Key: KXACIVYKDCQNQA-UHFFFAOYSA-N
- SMILES: O([Ga])[Ga]

Properties
Chemical formula	Ga_{2}O
Molar mass	155.445 g/mol
Appearance	brown powder
Density	4.77 g/cm^{3}
Melting point	800 °C (1,470 °F; 1,070 K) (decomposes)
Magnetic susceptibility (χ)	−34·10^{−6} cm^{3}/mol

Thermochemistry
Std enthalpy of formation (Δ_{f}H^{⦵}_{298})	−356.2 kJ/mol

Related compounds
Other cations	Boron monoxide Aluminium(I) oxide Indium(I) oxide Thallium(I) oxide
- Except where otherwise noted, data are given for materials in their standard state (at 25 °C [77 °F], 100 kPa). Infobox references

Gallium(I) oxide, digallium monoxide or gallium suboxide is an inorganic compound with the formula Ga_{2}O.

== Production ==
Gallium(I) oxide can be produced by reacting gallium(III) oxide with heated gallium in vacuum:

$$\mathrm{Ga_2 O_3 + 4 \ Ga \longrightarrow 3 \ Ga_2 O}$$

It can also be obtained by reacting gallium with carbon dioxide in vacuum at 850 °C.

$$\mathrm{2 \ Ga + CO_2 \longrightarrow Ga_2O + CO}$$

Gallium(I) oxide is a by-product in the production of gallium arsenide wafers:

$$\mathrm{4 \ Ga + SiO_2 \longrightarrow 2 \ Ga_2O + Si}$$

== Properties ==
Gallium(I) oxide is a brown-black diamagnetic solid which is resistant to further oxidation in dry air. It starts decomposing upon heating at temperatures above 500 °C, and the decomposition rate depends on the atmosphere (vacuum, inert gas, air).
