= Aluminium oxides =

Aluminium oxides or aluminum oxides are a group of inorganic compounds with formulas including aluminium (Al) and oxygen (O).

- Aluminium(I) oxide (Al_{2}O)
- Aluminium(II) oxide (AlO) (aluminium monoxide)
- Aluminium(III) oxide (aluminium oxide), (Al_{2}O_{3}), the most common form of aluminium oxide, occurring on the surface of aluminium and also in crystalline form as corundum, sapphire, and ruby.
