= Metal complexes of borohydride =

Metal complexes of borohydride refers to coordination complexes containing the borohydride (BH^{−}_{4}) ligand. The inventory is in the hundreds. Although these compounds have few practical applications, they have attracted much attention for their unusual structures.

== Bonding modes ==
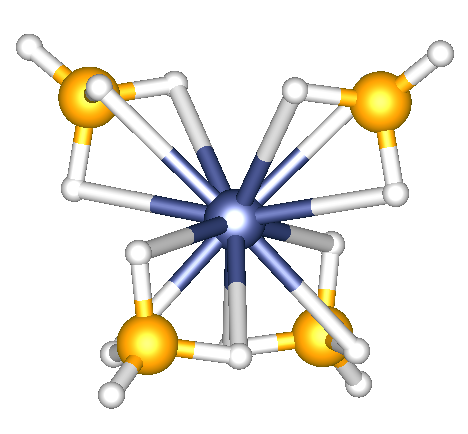
Structure of M(BH_{4})_{4} (M = Zr, Hf, Np, Pu). Color code: blue = M, yellow = B.

FeH(BH_{4})(dmpe)2, a complex of κ^{1}-BH^{−}_{4} (Me = CH_{3}).

The tetrahedral anion BH^{−}_{4} is isoelectronic with methane but more electron-rich owing to the electropositive character of boron and the negative charge. It binds to soft and hard metal centers. Borohydride binds metals by forming M-H-B linkages. A variety of bonding modes are observed: κ^{1}-, κ^{2}-, and κ^{3}- in which the BH^{−}_{4} is bonded via one, two, and three H atoms, respectively. Examples include Cu(κ^{1}-BH_{4})(PMePh_{2})_{3}, Cu(κ^{2}-BH_{4})(PPh_{3})_{2}, and the homoleptic complexes M(κ^{3}-BH_{4})_{4} (M = Zr, Hf, Np, and Pu). The latter highlight the ability of borohydride, which is compact, to give complexes of very high coordination numbers, Borohydride often functions as a bridging ligand.

=== Stereodynamics ===
Borohydride ligands characteristically exhibit fluxionality. They are subject to rapid "bridge-terminal exchange". For example, the room-temperature ^{1}H NMR spectrum of [Ti(CO)_{4}(κ^{3}-BH_{4})]^{−} shows only one hydride signal. At low temperatures, two signals in a ratio of 1:3 are resolved.

== Preparation ==
Commonly, borohydride complexes are prepared by salt metathesis reactions using potassium borohydride or sodium borohydride:

CuCl(PMePh_{2})_{3} + NaBH_{4} → Cu(κ^{1}-BH_{4})(PMePh_{2})_{3} + NaCl (Me = CH_{3}, Ph = C_{6}H_{5})

The homoleptic actinide derivatives are produced using aluminium borohydride:

AnF_{4} + 2 Al(BH_{4})_{3} → An(κ^{3}-BH_{4})_{4} + 2AlF_{2}BH_{4} (An = actinide metal)

The metathesis is accompanied by redox in the case of Ti(IV):

2 TiCl_{4} + 8 LiBH_{4} + 2 thf → 2 Ti(κ^{3}-BH_{4})_{3}(thf) + 8 LiCl + H_{2} + B_{2}H_{6} (thf = tetrahydrofuran)

Some metal hydride complexes react with sources of borane as well to give borohydrides.

== Applications ==
Metal complexes of borohydride have received some attention because they are volatile. The borohydrides of the actinides were investigated for isotope separation during the Manhattan Project. Some borohydride complexes have been used as hydride reducing agents.

== See also ==
- Metallaboranes, complexes with more complex boron hydrides.
