= Aluminium(II) oxide =

Unusual compound of aluminium in its rare oxidation state II

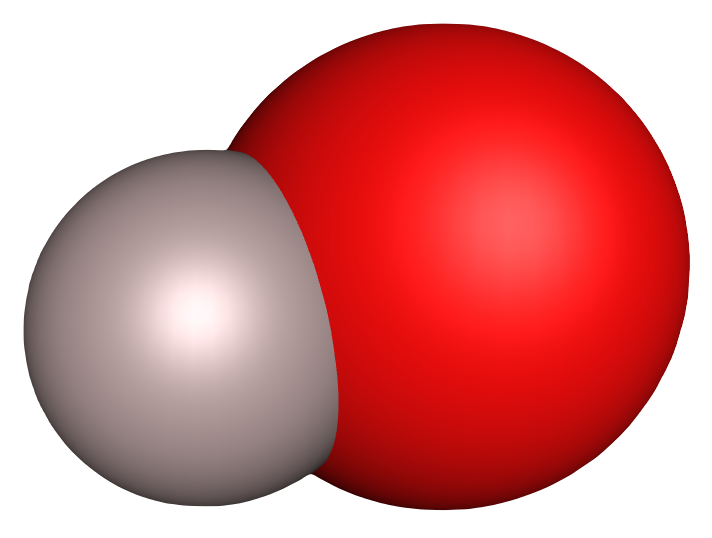

Names
- IUPAC name Aluminium(II) oxide
- Systematic IUPAC name Oxoalumanyl radical
- Other names Aluminium monoxide Oxidoaluminium; Oxoaluminum; Aluminious oxide

Identifiers
CAS Number	142844-00-6
3D model (JSmol)	Interactive image
ChEBI	CHEBI:30128
ChemSpider	125481
Gmelin Reference	349
PubChem CID	142249
CompTox Dashboard (EPA)	DTXSID20162755
- InChI: InChI=1S/Al.O Key: AIRCTMFFNKZQPN-UHFFFAOYSA-N; InChI=1/Al.O/rAlO/c1-2 Key: AIRCTMFFNKZQPN-IPBSAJSUAY
- SMILES: O=[Al]

Properties
Chemical formula	AlO
Molar mass	42.98 g/mol
- Except where otherwise noted, data are given for materials in their standard state (at 25 °C [77 °F], 100 kPa). verify (what is ?) Infobox references

Aluminium(II) oxide or aluminium monoxide is a compound of aluminium and oxygen with the chemical formula AlO. It has been detected in the gas phase after explosion of aluminized grenades in the upper atmosphere and in stellar absorption spectra.

Aluminium(II) oxide is one of the aluminium oxides (the most common is aluminium oxide Al_{2}O_{3}) and a rare example of an aluminium(II) compound since aluminium usually exists in its +3 oxidation state.

== Reactions ==
Aluminium monoxide is an unstable compound, due to it easily reacting with oxygen to become aluminium(III) oxide:

4AlO + O_{2} → 2Al_{2}O_{3}

== See also ==
- Aluminium oxide
- Aluminium(I) oxide
