= Aluminium borohydride =

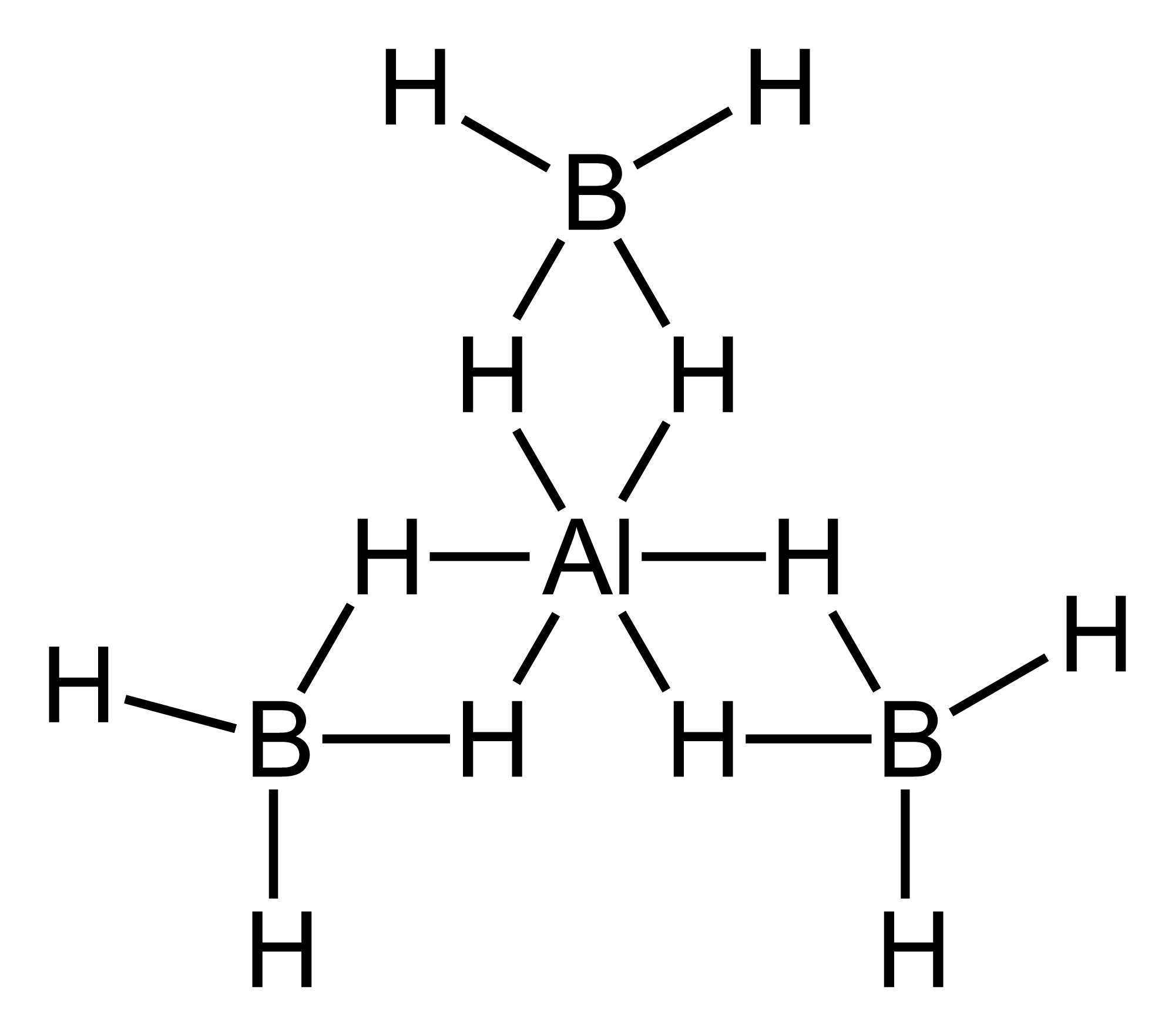
- Structural formula of the aluminium borohydride molecule

Names
- IUPAC name Aluminium borohydride
- Other names Aluminium borohydride, aluminium tetrahydroborate

Identifiers
CAS Number	16962-07-5
3D model (JSmol)	Interactive image
ChemSpider	55734
PubChem CID	6328559 PubChem has bad formula
UNII	7OBU10UOXG
UN number	2870
CompTox Dashboard (EPA)	DTXSID801028871
- InChI: InChI=1S/Al.3BH4/h;3*1H4/q+3;3*-1 Key: LNJYEMMRSAGORU-UHFFFAOYSA-N; InChI=1/Al.3BH4/h;3*1H4/q+3;3*-1 Key: LNJYEMMRSAGORU-UHFFFAOYAC
- SMILES: [Al+3].[BH4-].[BH4-].[BH4-]

Properties
Chemical formula	AlB_{3}H_{12}
Molar mass	71.51 g·mol^{−1}
Appearance	colorless liquid
Melting point	−64.5 °C (−84.1 °F; 208.7 K)
Boiling point	44.5 °C (112.1 °F; 317.6 K)
Solubility in water	reacts

Hazards
Flash point	Spontaneously ignites
- Except where otherwise noted, data are given for materials in their standard state (at 25 °C [77 °F], 100 kPa). verify (what is ?) Infobox references

Aluminium borohydride, also known as aluminium tetrahydroborate, is the chemical compound with the formula Al(BH_{4})_{3}. It is a volatile pyrophoric liquid which is used as a reducing agent in laboratories. Unlike most other metal–borohydrides, which are ionic structures, aluminium borohydride is a covalent compound.

== Preparation ==
Aluminium borohydride is formed by the reaction between sodium borohydride with aluminium chloride:

3 NaBH_{4} + AlCl_{3} → Al(BH_{4})_{3} + 3 NaCl

or as the non-pyrophoric tetrahydrofuran (THF) adduct, by the analogous reaction of calcium borohydride and aluminium chloride in THF:

3 Ca(BH_{4})_{2} + 2 AlCl_{3} → 3 CaCl_{2} + 2 Al(BH_{4})_{3}

== Reactions ==
Like most borohydrides, this compound is a reducing agent and hydride donor. It reacts with water to give elemental hydrogen gas, and reduces carboxylic esters, aldehydes, and ketones to alcohols.

It is used to prepare metal complexes of borohydride:

AnF_{4} + 2 Al(BH_{4})_{3} → An(κ^{3}-BH_{4})_{4} + 2AIF_{2}BH_{4} (An = actinide metal)

When aluminium borohydride is heated, diborane is released, and a dialuminium dihydride forms:

2 Al(BH_{4})_{3} → Al_{2}H_{2}(BH_{4})_{4} + B_{2}H_{6}
