= Gallium nitrate =

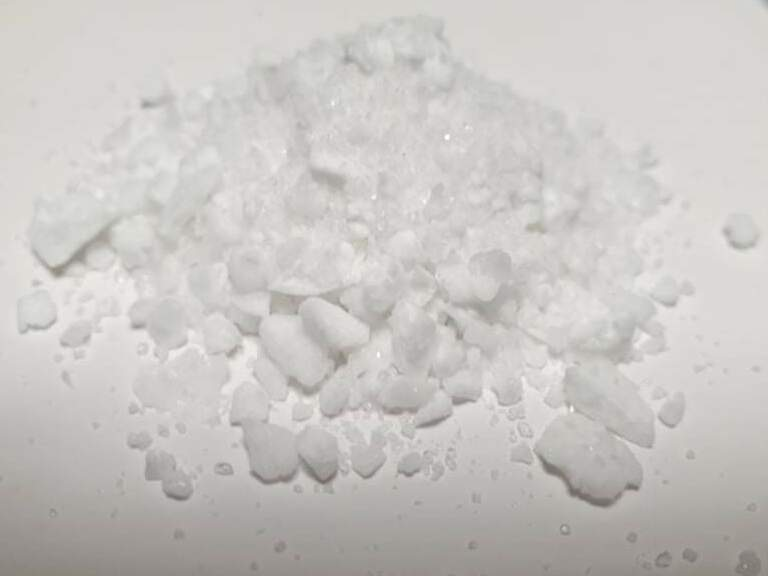

Names
- IUPAC name Gallium trinitrate
- Other names Gallium(III) nitrate Nitric acid, gallium salt

Identifiers
CAS Number	13494-90-1
3D model (JSmol)	Interactive image
ChEMBL	ChEMBL1200983
ChemSpider	55543
DrugBank	DB05260
ECHA InfoCard	100.033.453
EC Number	236-815-5
PubChem CID	61635
UNII	Y2V2R4W9TQ
UN number	1477
CompTox Dashboard (EPA)	DTXSID0043923
- InChI: InChI=1S/Ga.3NO3/c;3*2-1(3)4/q+3;3*-1 Key: CHPZKNULDCNCBW-UHFFFAOYSA-N
- SMILES: [N+](=O)([O-])[O-].[N+](=O)([O-])[O-].[N+](=O)([O-])[O-].[Ga+3]

Properties
Chemical formula	Ga(NO_{3})_{3}
Molar mass	255.7377 g/mol

Hazards
- GHS labelling
Pictograms	(GHS03: Oxidizing) (GHS05: Corrosive) (GHS07: Exclamation mark)
Signal word	Danger
Hazard statements	H272, H314, H315, H319, H335
Precautionary statements	P210, P220, P221, P260, P264, P271, P280, P301+P330+P331, P302+P352, P303+P361+P353, P304+P340, P305+P351+P338, P310, P312, P321, P332+P313, P337+P313, P362, P363, P370+P378, P403+P233, P405, P501
- Except where otherwise noted, data are given for materials in their standard state (at 25 °C [77 °F], 100 kPa). verify (what is ?) Infobox references

Gallium nitrate (brand name Ganite) is the gallium salt of nitric acid with the chemical formula Ga(NO_{3})_{3}. It is a drug used to treat symptomatic hypercalcemia secondary to cancer. It works by preventing the breakdown of bone through the inhibition of osteoclast activity, thus lowering the amount of free calcium in the blood. Gallium nitrate is also used to synthesize other gallium compounds.

== History ==
Gallium (Ga) was discovered in 1875 by P.É. Lecoq de Boisbaudran. In most of its compounds, gallium is found with an oxidation number of 3+. Gallium chemically behaves similarly to iron 3+ when forming a coordination complex. That means gallium(III) and iron(III) are similar in similar coordination number, electrical charge, ion diameter and electron configuration.

=== Biological activity ===
Gallium atoms are bound to the phosphates of DNA at low gallium concentrations, forming a stable complex. Gallium competes with magnesium in DNA binding, since its DNA affinity is 100 times higher than that of magnesium. No interactions have been found between the metal and DNA bases. According to Hedley et al., gallium inhibits replicative DNA synthesis, the major gallium-specific target probably being ribonucleotide reductase. In addition to that, it was reported by Chitambar that gallium binds to transferrin more strongly than iron. The transferrin gallium complex inhibits DNA synthesis by acting on the M2 subunit of ribonucleotide reductase. Gallium(III) seems to act as an antagonist to the actions of several ions (Ca^{2+}, Mg^{2+}, Fe^{2+} and Zn^{2+}) in processes of cellular metabolism. The action of gallium on bone metabolism decreases hypercalcemia associated with cancer. However, gallium is mostly found within the cell as a salt in lysosomes.

== Preparation ==
Gallium nitrate is commercially available as the hydrate. The nonahydrate may also be prepared by dissolving gallium in nitric acid, followed by recrystallization. The structure of gallium nitrate nonahydrate has been determined by X-ray crystallography.

== Use and manufacturing ==
=== Preparation of gallium nitride from gallium nitrate ===
GaN powder was synthesized using a direct current (DC) non-transferred arc plasma.

=== Medication Information ===
Gallium nitrate injection (Ganite) is a clear, colorless, odorless, solution of the nonahydrate (Ga(NO_{3})_{3}·9H_{2}O) which is readily soluble in water. Each mL of Ganite contains 25 mg of Ga(NO_{3})_{3} (anhydrous basis) and sodium citrate dihydrate 28.75 mg. The solution may contain sodium hydroxide or hydrochloric acid for pH adjustment to 6.0-7.0.

=== Overdose ===
Use of higher doses of gallium nitrate than recommended may cause nausea, vomiting and increases risk of chronic kidney disease. In the case of overdose, serum calcium should be monitored, patients should receive vigorous hydration for 2–3 days and any further drug administrations should be discontinued.

== Treatment ==
The action of gallium in gallium nitrate on bone metabolism decreases the hypercalcemia associated with cancer. Gallium inhibits osteoclastic activity and therefore decreases hydroxyapatite crystal formation, with adsorption of gallium onto the surfaces of hydroxyapatite crystals. Also, the increased concentration of gallium in the bone leads to increasing the synthesis of collagen as well as the formation of the bone tissue inside the cell. It has been reported that a protracted infusion was effective against cancer-associated hypercalcemia. Preliminary studies in bladder carcinoma, carcinoma of the urothelium and lymphomas are also promising. Another interesting schedule of subcutaneous injection with low doses of gallium nitrate has been proposed, especially for the treatment of bone metastases, but the definitive results have not yet been published.

== Chemical reactivity ==
Gallium nitrate can react with reducing agents to generate heat and products that may be gaseous. The products may themselves be capable of further reactions (such as combustion in the air). The chemical reduction of materials in this group can be rapid, but do not necessarily proceed without addition of heat, catalyst or addition of a solvent. Explosive mixtures of gallium nitrate with reducing agents often remain unchanged for long periods if the reaction is not initiated. It is soluble in water; dissolution weakens but does not nullify its oxidizing capability. Generally, inorganic oxidizing agents can react violently with active metals, cyanides, esters, and thiocyanates.

== Adverse reactions ==
=== Kidney ===
Adverse renal effects have been reported in about 12.5% of patients treated with gallium nitrate. Two patients receiving gallium nitrate and one patient receiving calcitonin developed acute renal failure in a controlled trial of patients with cancer-related hypercalcemia. Also, it was reported that gallium nitrate should not be administered to patients with serum creatinine >2.5 mg/dL.

=== Blood pressure ===
In a controlled trial of patients, it was noticed a decrease in mean systolic and diastolic blood pressure after the treatment with gallium nitrate. The decrease in blood pressure was asymptomatic and did not require specific treatment.

=== Hematologic ===
High doses of gallium nitrate were associated with anemia when used in treating patients for advanced cancer. As a result, several patients have received red blood cell transfusions.

== See also ==
- Bone resorption
