= Solar-blind technology =

Imaging technology

Solar-blind technology is a set of technologies to produce images without interference from the Sun. This is done by using wavelengths of ultraviolet light that are totally absorbed by the ozone layer, yet are transmitted in the Earth's atmosphere. Wavelengths from 240 to 280 nm are completely absorbed by the ozone layer. Elements of this technology are ultraviolet light sources, ultraviolet image detectors, and filters that only transmit the range of wavelengths that are blocked by ozone. A system will also have a signal processing system, and a way to display the results (image).

== Ultraviolet sources ==
Ultraviolet illumination can be produced from longer wavelengths using non-linear optical materials. These can be a second harmonic generator. They must have a suitable birefringence in order to phase match the output frequency doubled UV light. One compound commercially used is L-arginine phosphate monohydrate known as LAP. Research is underway for substances that are very non-linear, have a suitable birefringence, are transparent in the spectrum and have a high degree of resistance to damage from lasers.

== Optical system ==
Normal glass does not transmit below 350 nm, so it is not used for optics in solar-blind systems. Instead calcium fluoride, fused silica, and magnesium fluoride are used as they are transparent to shorter wavelengths.

== Filters ==
An optical filter can be used to block out visible light and near-ultraviolet light. It is important to have a high transmittance within the solar-blind spectrum, but to strongly block the other wavelengths.

Interference filters can pass 25% of the wanted rays, and reduce others by 1000 to 10,000 times. However they are unstable and have a narrow field of view.

Absorption filters may only pass 10% of wanted UV, but can reject by a ratio of 10^{12}. They can have a wide field of view and are stable.

== Ultraviolet detectors ==
Semiconductor ultraviolet detectors are solid state, and convert an ultraviolet photon into an electric pulse. If they are transparent to visible light, then they will not be sensitive to light.

name	limit nm	efficiency	ref
hexagonal boron nitride	300		
hydrogenated amorphous silicon	187	20%	
amorphous silicon carbide	187	20%	
gallium nitride			
zinc oxide			
diamond			
photomultiplier tube	300	30%	

== Use ==
Solar-blind imaging can be used to detect corona discharge, in electrical infrastructure. Missile exhaust can be detected from the troposphere or ground. Also when looking down on the Earth from space, the Earth appears dark in this range, so rockets can be easily detected from above once they pass the ozone layer. Israel, the People's Republic of China (PRC), Russia, South Africa, the United Kingdom (UK), and the United States (US) are developing this technology.
