= Aluminium(I) oxide =

Unusual compound of aluminium in its rare oxidation state I

Identifiers
CAS Number	12004-36-3
3D model (JSmol)	Interactive image; Interactive image
ChemSpider	17615568
PubChem CID	16682998
CompTox Dashboard (EPA)	DTXSID30152662
- InChI: InChI=1S/2Al.O Key: BYFGZMCJNACEKR-UHFFFAOYSA-N
- SMILES: [Al]O[Al]; [O--].[Al+].[Al+]

Properties
Chemical formula	Al_{2}O
Molar mass	69.962 g·mol^{−1}
- Except where otherwise noted, data are given for materials in their standard state (at 25 °C [77 °F], 100 kPa). verify (what is ?) Infobox references

Aluminium(I) oxide is a compound of aluminium and oxygen with the chemical formula Al_{2}O. It can be prepared by heating the stable oxide Al_{2}O_{3} with elemental silicon at 1800 °C under vacuum.

== Formation and occurrence ==
Al_{2}O commonly exists as a gas, since the solid state is not stable at room temperature and is only stable between 1050 and 1600 °C. Aluminium(I) oxide is formed by heating Al and Al_{2}O_{3} in a vacuum while in the presence of SiO_{2} and C, and only by condensing the products. Information is not commonly available on this compound; it is unstable, has complex high-temperature spectra, and is difficult to detect and identify. In reduction, Al_{2}O is a major component of vapors of Al_{2}O_{3}. There are also 12 valence electrons in Al_{2}O. Al_{2}O molecules can be detected by mass spectrometry, infrared emission, and ultraviolet absorption and emission in the gas phase. The molecule is linear at equilibrium in the ground state. In term of valence bond theory, these molecules can be described as adopting sp^{2} orbital hybridisation, featuring one sigma and two pi bonds. The corresponding ground state for the valence electrons is 1σ^{2} 1σ*^{2} 2σ^{2} 1π^{4} 1π*^{2}, where the 1σ and 1σ* orbitals cancel, and the 1π and 1π* partially cancel. The overall configuration yields a divalent triplet molecule, with one lone electron focused on the oxygen atom and the other focused equally between the aluminium atoms.

== Infrared measurements ==
Prominent absorptions are observed at 990.7 and 946.6 cm^{−1}, which indicates the presence of a doublet. After diffusion absorptions are observed at 714.8 and 700 cm^{−1}, which indicates a doublet and also at 689.4 cm^{−1}, characteristics of a triplet system with two equivalent oxygen atoms. In a more concentrated matrix, both doublet and triplet systems are detected at 715 cm^{−1}. However, after diffusion, the triplet system enhances and the double system decreases. The diffusion implies that Al_{2}O is an aggregate species, since it only appears in concentrated matrices, which may be due to polymerization. The triplet may be due to the presence of a dimer, (Al_{2}O)_{2}, however this should be viewed as relative, since the vapor pressure of Al_{2}O is uncertain.

== Uses ==
Aluminium as a metal fuel with oxidizers creates highly exothermic reactions. When Al_{2}O_{3} is added to a pressure system, the reaction goes from steady, to accelerating, to unstable. This reaction indicates that unstable intermediates such as AlO or Al_{2}O condense or do not form, which prevent acceleration and convection down the pressure system.

== See also ==
- Aluminium oxide
- Aluminium(II) oxide
- Oxide
