= Coordination number =

Number of atoms, molecules or ions bonded to a molecule or crystal

In chemistry, crystallography, and materials science, the coordination number, also called ligancy, of a central atom in a molecule or crystal is the number of atoms, molecules or ions bonded to it. The ion/molecule/atom surrounding the central ion/molecule/atom is called a ligand. This number is determined somewhat differently for molecules than for crystals.

For molecules and polyatomic ions the coordination number of an atom is determined by simply counting the other atoms to which it is bonded (by either single or multiple bonds). For example, [Cr(NH_{3})_{2}Cl_{2}Br_{2}]^{−} has Cr^{3+} as its central cation, which has a coordination number of 6 and is described as hexacoordinate. The common coordination numbers are 4, 6 and 8.

== Molecules, polyatomic ions and coordination complexes ==
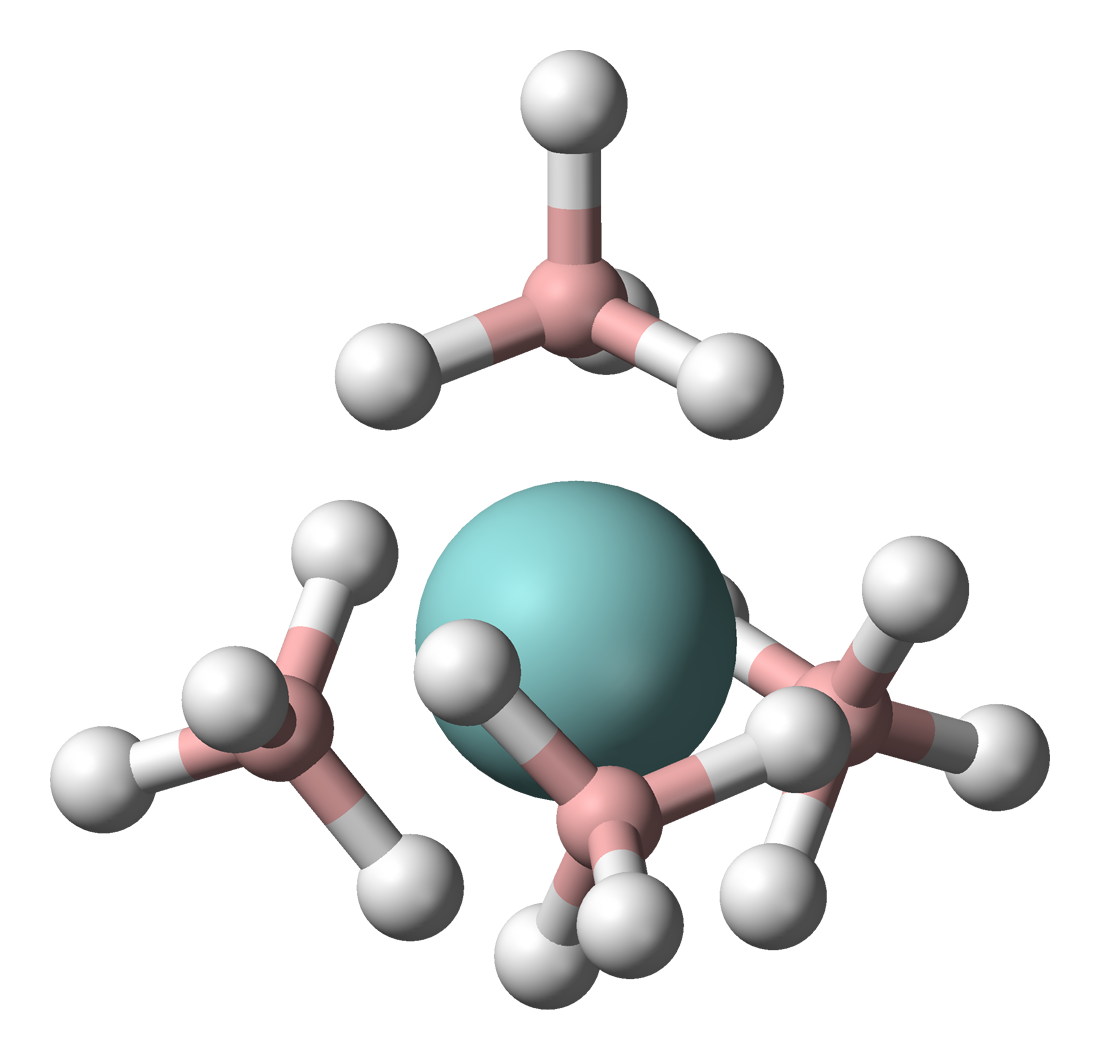
Ball-and-stick model of gaseous U(BH_{4})_{4}, which features 12-coordinate metal centre.

[Co(NH_{3})_{6}]^{3+}, which features 6-coordinate metal centre with octahedral molecular geometry.

Chloro(triphenylphosphine)gold(I), which features 2-coordinate metal centre.

In chemistry, coordination number, defined originally in 1893 by Alfred Werner, is the total number of neighbors of a central atom in a molecule or ion. The concept is most commonly applied to coordination complexes.

== Simple and commonplace cases ==
The most common coordination number for d-block transition metal complexes is 6. The coordination number does not distinguish the geometry of such complexes, i.e. octahedral vs trigonal prismatic.

For transition metal complexes, coordination numbers range from 2 (e.g., Au^{I} in Ph_{3}PAuCl) to 9 (e.g., Re^{VII} in [ReH_{9}]^{2−}). Metals in the f-block (the lanthanoids and actinoids) can accommodate higher coordination number due to their greater ionic radii and availability of more orbitals for bonding. Coordination numbers of 8 to 12 are commonly observed for f-block elements. For example, with bidentate nitrate ions as ligands, Ce^{IV} and Th^{IV} form the 12-coordinate ions [Ce(NO_{3})_{6}]^{2−} (ceric ammonium nitrate) and [Th(NO_{3})_{6}]^{2−}. When the surrounding ligands are much smaller than the central atom, even higher coordination numbers may be possible. One computational chemistry study predicted a particularly stable PbHe^{2+}_{15} ion composed of a central lead ion coordinated with no fewer than 15 helium atoms. Among the Frank–Kasper phases, the packing of metallic atoms can give coordination numbers of up to 16. At the opposite extreme, steric shielding can give rise to unusually low coordination numbers. An extremely rare instance of a metal adopting a coordination number of 1 occurs in the terphenyl-based arylthallium(I) complex 2,6-Tipp_{2}C_{6}H_{3}Tl, where Tipp is the 2,4,6-triisopropylphenyl group.

=== Polyhapto ligands ===
Coordination numbers become ambiguous when dealing with polyhapto ligands. For π-electron ligands such as the cyclopentadienide ion [C_{5}H_{5}]^{−}, alkenes and the cyclooctatetraenide ion [C_{8}H_{8}]^{2−}, the number of adjacent atoms in the π-electron system that bind to the central atom is termed the hapticity. In ferrocene the hapticity, η, of each cyclopentadienide anion is five, Fe(η^{5}-C_{5}H_{5})_{2}. Various ways exist for assigning the contribution made to the coordination number of the central iron atom by each cyclopentadienide ligand. The contribution could be assigned as one since there is one ligand, or as five since there are five neighbouring atoms, or as three since there are three electron pairs involved. Normally the count of electron pairs is taken.

== Surfaces and reconstruction ==
The coordination numbers are well defined for atoms in the interior of a crystal lattice: one counts the nearest neighbors in all directions. The number of neighbors of an interior atom is termed the bulk coordination number. For surfaces, the number of neighbors is more limited, so the surface coordination number is smaller than the bulk coordination number. Often the surface coordination number is unknown or variable. The surface coordination number is also dependent on the Miller indices of the surface. In a body-centered cubic (BCC) crystal, the bulk coordination number is 8, whereas, for the (100) surface, the surface coordination number is 4.

== Experimental determination ==
A common way to determine the coordination number of an atom is by X-ray crystallography. Related techniques include neutron or electron diffraction. The coordination number of an atom can be determined straightforwardly by counting nearest neighbors.

For example, α-Aluminium has a regular cubic close packed structure, fcc, where each aluminium atom has 12 nearest neighbors, 6 in the same plane and 3 above and below and the coordination polyhedron is a cuboctahedron. α-Iron has a body centered cubic structure where each iron atom has 8 nearest neighbors situated at the corners of a cube.

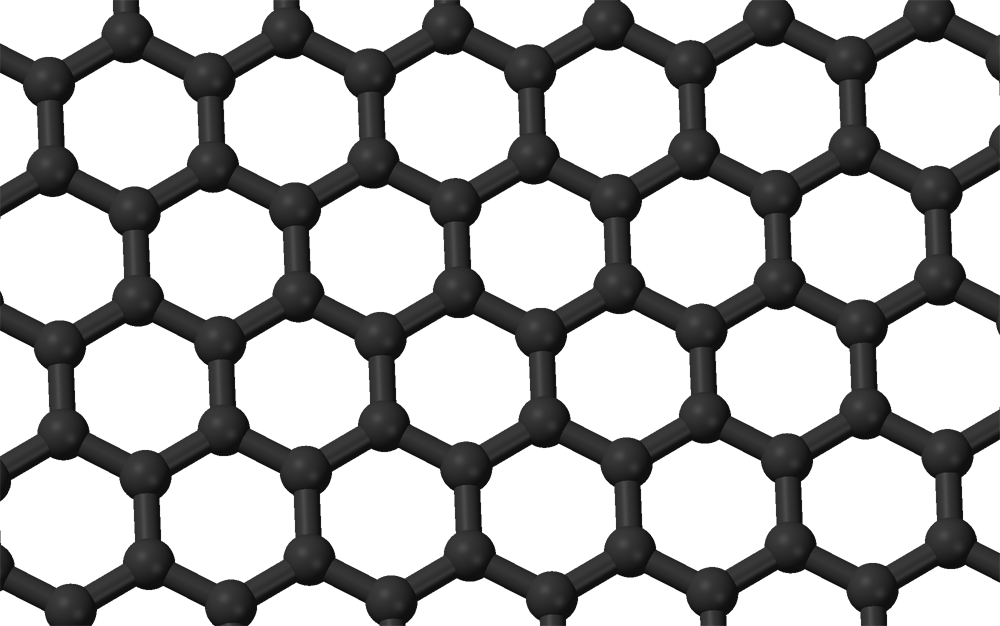
A graphite layer, carbon atoms and C–C bonds shown in black.

The two most common allotropes of carbon have different coordination numbers. In diamond, each carbon atom is at the centre of a regular tetrahedron formed by four other carbon atoms, the coordination number is four, as for methane. Graphite is made of two-dimensional layers in which each carbon is covalently bonded to three other carbons; atoms in other layers are further away and are not nearest neighbours, giving a coordination number of 3.

bcc structure

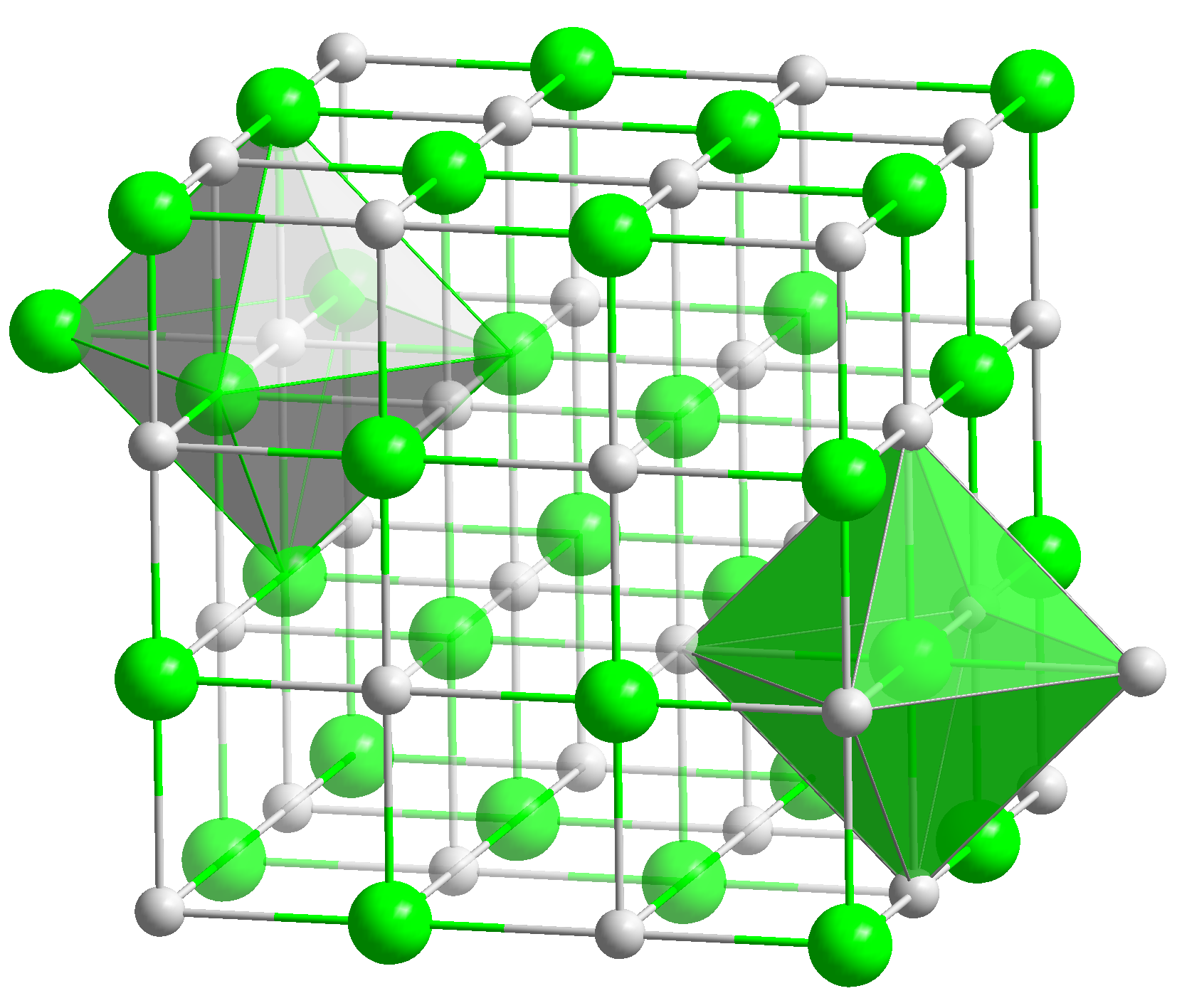
Ions with coordination number six comprise the highly symmetrical "rock salt structure".

For chemical compounds with regular lattices such as sodium chloride and caesium chloride, a count of the nearest neighbors gives a good picture of the environment of the ions. In sodium chloride each sodium ion has 6 chloride ions as nearest neighbours (at 276 pm) at the corners of an octahedron and each chloride ion has 6 sodium atoms (also at 276 pm) at the corners of an octahedron. In caesium chloride each caesium has 8 chloride ions (at 356 pm) situated at the corners of a cube and each chloride has eight caesium ions (also at 356 pm) at the corners of a cube.

=== Complications ===
International Union of Crystallography, IUCR, states that the coordination number of an atom in a crystalline solid depends on the chemical bonding model and the way in which the coordination number is calculated.

In some compounds the metal-ligand bonds may not all be at the same distance. For example in PbCl_{2}, the coordination number of Pb^{2+} depends on which chlorides are assigned as ligands. Seven chloride ligands have Pb-Cl distances of 280–309 pm. Two chloride ligands are more distant, with a Pb-Cl distances of 370 pm.

Some metals have irregular structures. For example, zinc has a distorted hexagonal close packed structure. Regular hexagonal close packing of spheres would predict that each atom has 12 nearest neighbours and a triangular orthobicupola (also called an anticuboctahedron or twinned cuboctahedron) coordination polyhedron. In zinc there are only 6 nearest neighbours at 266 pm in the same close packed plane with six other, next-nearest neighbours, equidistant, three in each of the close packed planes above and below at 291 pm. The coordination number of Zn can be assigned as 12 rather than 6. Similar considerations can be applied to the regular body centred cube structure where in addition to the 8 nearest neighbors there 6 more, approximately 15% more distant, and in this case the coordination number is often considered to be 14.

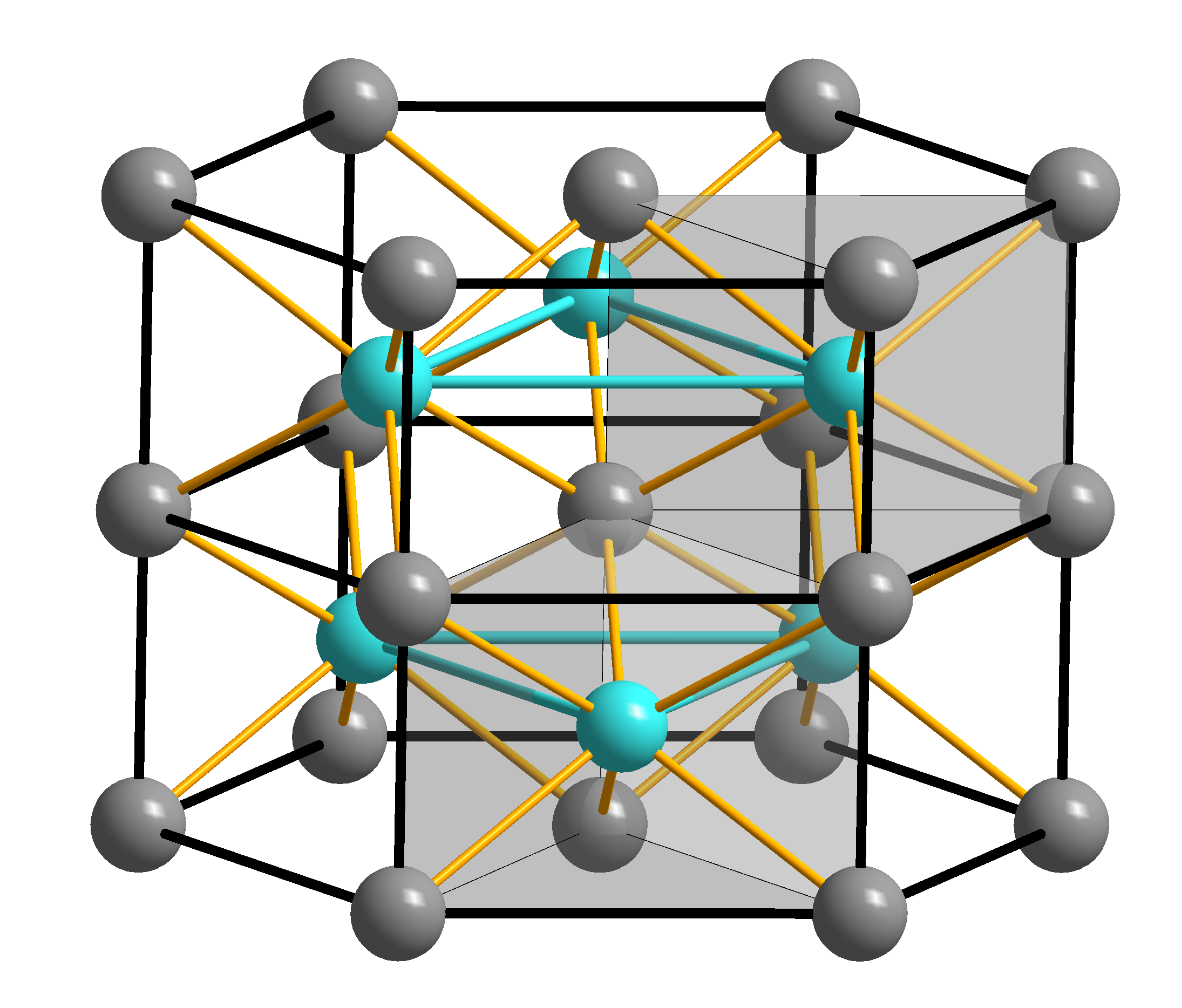
NiAs structure

In Nickel arsenide (NiAs) and several related compounds, the coordination number of the metal is ambiguous. The metal is bound to six As ligands, but also has two Ni---Ni contacts that could qualify as bonds.

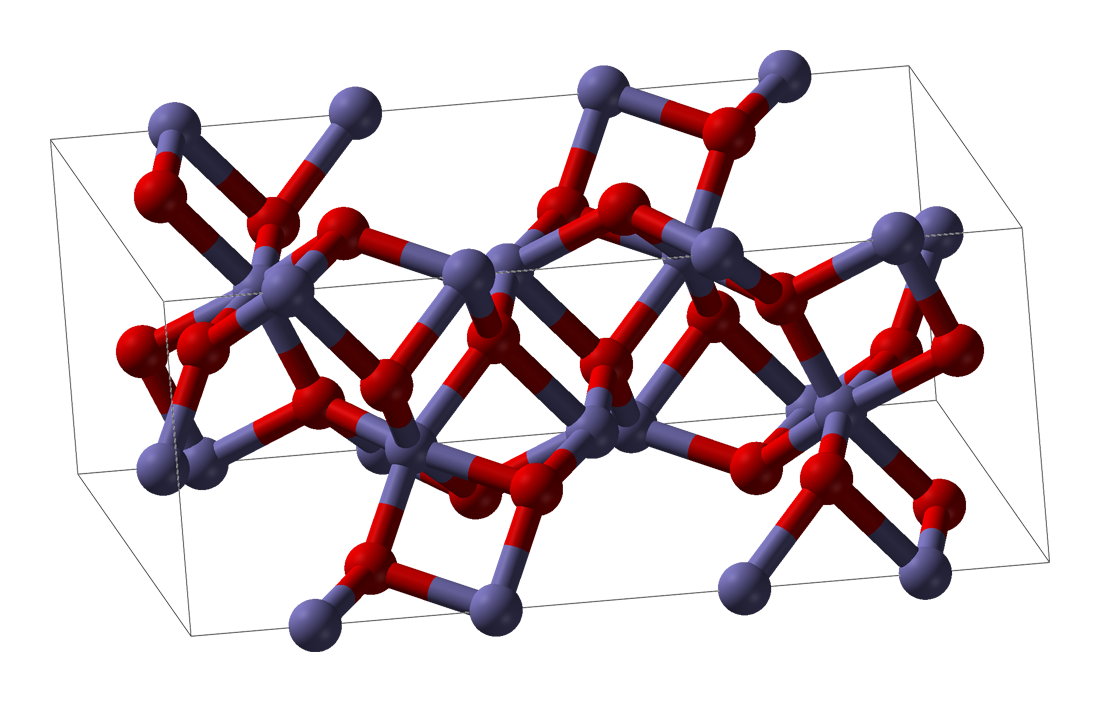
Fe_{2}O_{3} structure

Two other examples of commonly-encountered chemicals are Fe_{2}O_{3} and TiO_{2}. Fe_{2}O_{3} has a crystal structure that can be described as having a near close packed array of oxygen atoms with iron atoms filling two thirds of the octahedral holes. However each iron atom has 3 nearest neighbors and 3 others a little further away. The structure is quite complex, the oxygen atoms are coordinated to four iron atoms and the iron atoms in turn share vertices, edges and faces of the distorted octahedra. TiO_{2} has the rutile structure. The titanium atoms 6-coordinate, 2 atoms at 198.3 pm and 4 at 194.6 pm, in a slightly distorted octahedron. The octahedra around the titanium atoms share edges and vertices to form a 3-D network. The oxide ions are 3-coordinate in a trigonal planar configuration.

Several propositions have been made to calculate a mean or « effective » coordination number (e.c.n. or ECoN) by adding all surrounding atoms with a weighting scheme, in that the atoms are not counted as full atoms, but as fractional atoms with a number between 0 and 1; this number is closer to zero when the atom is further away. Frequently a gap can be found in the distribution of the interatomic distance of the neighboring atoms: if the shortest distance to a neighboring atom is set equal to 1, then often further atoms are found at distances between 1 and 1.3, and after them follows a gap in which no atoms are found.

According to a proposition of G. Brunner and D. Schwarzenbach an atom at the distance of 1 obtains a weight 1, the first atom beyond the gap obtains zero weight, and all intermediate atoms are included with weights that are calculated from their distances by linear interpolation:

$e.c.n. = \sum_{i}\left ( \frac{d_g-d_i}{d_g-d_1} \right )$

where $d_1$ is the distance to the closest atom, $d_g$ is the distance to the first atom beyond the gap and $d_i$ is the distance to the i-th atom in the region between $d_1$ and $d_g$. This method is however of no help when no clear gap can be discerned.

A mathematically unique method of calculation considers the domain of influence (also called Voronoi polyhedron, Wigner-Seitz cell or Dirichlet domain). The domain is constructed by connecting the atom in question with all surrounding atoms; the set of planes perpendicular to the connecting lines and passing through their midpoints forms the domain of influence, which is a convex polyhedron. In this way, a polyhedron face can be assigned to every neighboring atom, the area of the face serving as measure for the weighting. A value of 1 is assigned to the largest face. Other formulas have also been derived, for example:

$ECoN = \sum_{i} \exp\left[1-\left ( \frac{d_i}{d_1} \right )^n\right]$

where $n$ = 5 or 6, $d_i$ is the distance to the i-th atom and $d_1$ is the shortest distance or the assumed standard distance.

== Usage in quasicrystal, liquid and other disordered systems ==
First coordination number of Lennard-Jones fluid

Second coordination number of Lennard-Jones fluid

The coordination number of systems with disorder cannot be precisely defined.

The first coordination number can be defined using the radial distribution function g(r):
$$n_1 = 4 \pi \int_{r_0}^{r_1} r^2 g(r) \rho \, dr,$$
where r_{0} is the rightmost position starting from r = 0 whereon g(r) is approximately zero, r_{1} is the first minimum. Therefore, it is the area under the first peak of g(r).

The second coordination number is defined similarly:
$$n_2 = 4 \pi \int_{r_1}^{r_2} r^2 g(r) \rho \, dr.$$

Alternative definitions for the coordination number can be found in literature, but in essence the main idea is the same. One of those definition are as follows: Denoting the position of the first peak as r_{p},
$$n'_1 = 8 \pi \int_{r_0}^{r_p} r^2 g(r) \rho \, dr.$$

The first coordination shell is the spherical shell with radius between r_{0} and r_{1} around the central particle under investigation.
