= Gallium compounds =

Any chemical compound having at least one gallium atom in its structure

Gallium compounds are compounds containing the element gallium. These compounds are found primarily in the +3 oxidation state. The +1 oxidation state is also found in some compounds, although it is less common than it is for gallium's heavier congeners indium and thallium. For example, the very stable GaCl_{2} contains both gallium(I) and gallium(III) and can be formulated as Ga^{I}Ga^{III}Cl_{4}; in contrast, the monochloride is unstable above 0 °C, disproportionating into elemental gallium and gallium(III) chloride. Compounds containing Ga–Ga bonds are true gallium(II) compounds, such as GaS (which can be formulated as Ga_{2}^{4+}(S^{2−})_{2}) and the dioxan complex Ga_{2}Cl_{4}(C_{4}H_{8}O_{2})_{2}. There are also compounds of gallium with negative oxidation states, ranging from −5 to −1, most of these compounds being magnesium gallides (Mg_{x}Ga_{y}).

== Aqueous chemistry ==
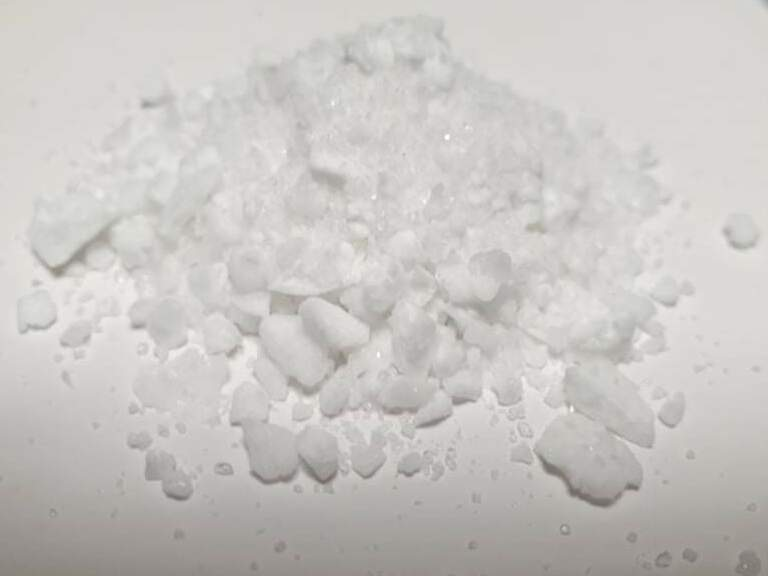
Gallium nitrate nonahydrate

Strong acids dissolve gallium, forming gallium(III) salts such as Ga(NO_{3})_{3} (gallium nitrate). Aqueous solutions of gallium(III) salts contain the hydrated gallium ion, [Ga(H_{2}O)_{6}]^{3+}. Gallium(III) hydroxide, Ga(OH)_{3}, may be precipitated from gallium(III) solutions by adding ammonia. Dehydrating Ga(OH)_{3} at 100 °C produces gallium oxide hydroxide, GaO(OH).

Alkaline hydroxide solutions dissolve gallium, forming gallate salts (not to be confused with identically named gallic acid salts) containing the Ga(OH)^{−}_{4} anion. Gallium hydroxide, which is amphoteric, also dissolves in alkali to form gallate salts. Although earlier work suggested Ga(OH)^{3−}_{6} as another possible gallate anion, it was not found in later work.

== Oxides and chalcogenides ==
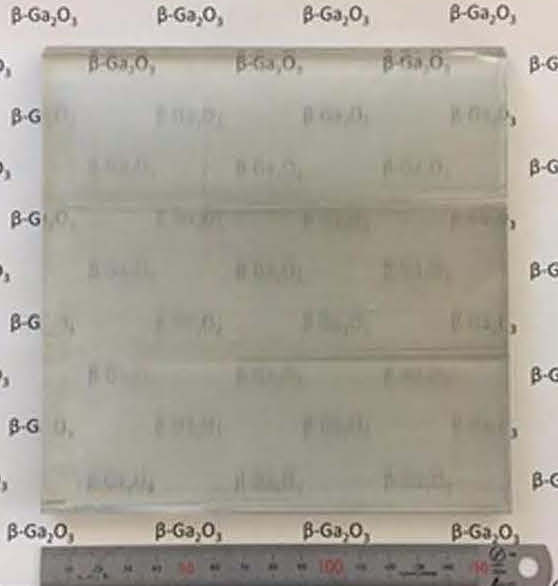
A gallium trioxide crystal

Gallium reacts with the chalcogens only at relatively high temperatures. At room temperature, gallium metal is not reactive with air and water because it forms a passive, protective oxide layer. At higher temperatures, however, it reacts with atmospheric oxygen to form gallium(III) oxide, Ga_{2}O_{3}. Reducing Ga_{2}O_{3} with elemental gallium in vacuum at 500 °C to 700 °C yields the dark brown gallium(I) oxide, Ga_{2}O. Ga_{2}O is a very strong reducing agent, capable of reducing H_{2}SO_{4} to H_{2}S. It disproportionates at 800 °C back to gallium and Ga_{2}O_{3}.

Gallium(III) sulfide, Ga_{2}S_{3}, has 3 possible crystal modifications. It can be made by the reaction of gallium with hydrogen sulfide (H_{2}S) at 950 °C. Alternatively, Ga(OH)_{3} can be used at 747 °C:

2 Ga(OH)_{3} + 3 H_{2}S → Ga_{2}S_{3} + 6 H_{2}O

Reacting a mixture of alkali metal carbonates and Ga_{2}O_{3} with H_{2}S leads to the formation of thiogallates containing the [Ga_{2}S_{4}]^{2−} anion. Strong acids decompose these salts, releasing H_{2}S in the process. The mercury salt, HgGa_{2}S_{4}, can be used as a phosphor.

Gallium also forms sulfides in lower oxidation states, such as gallium(II) sulfide and the green gallium(I) sulfide, the latter of which is produced from the former by heating to 1000 °C under a stream of nitrogen.

The other binary chalcogenides, Ga_{2}Se_{3} and Ga_{2}Te_{3}, have the zincblende structure. They are all semiconductors but are easily hydrolysed and have limited utility.

== Nitrides and pnictides ==
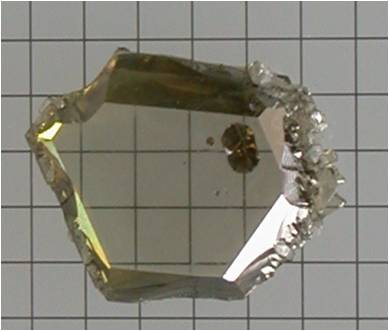
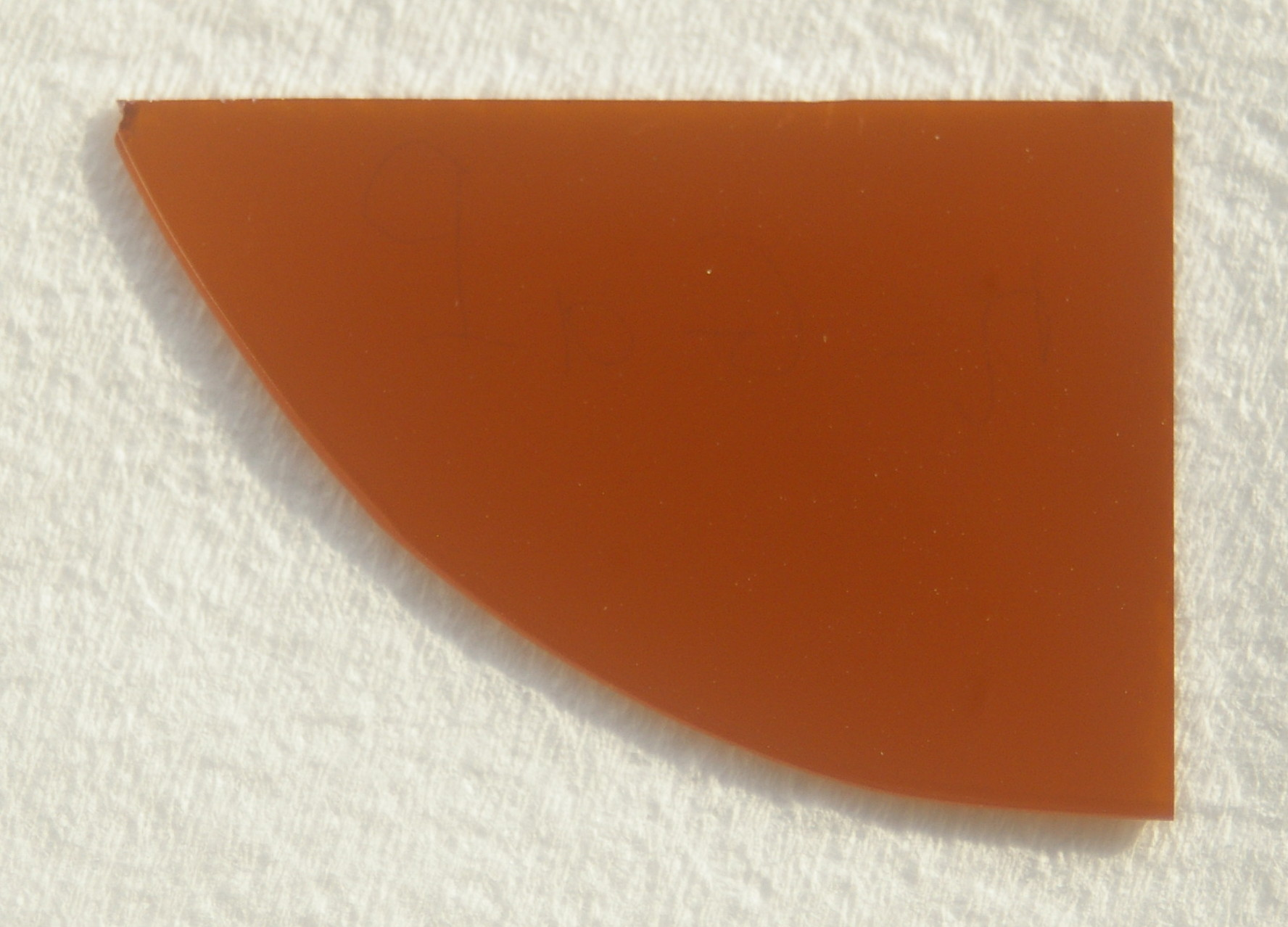
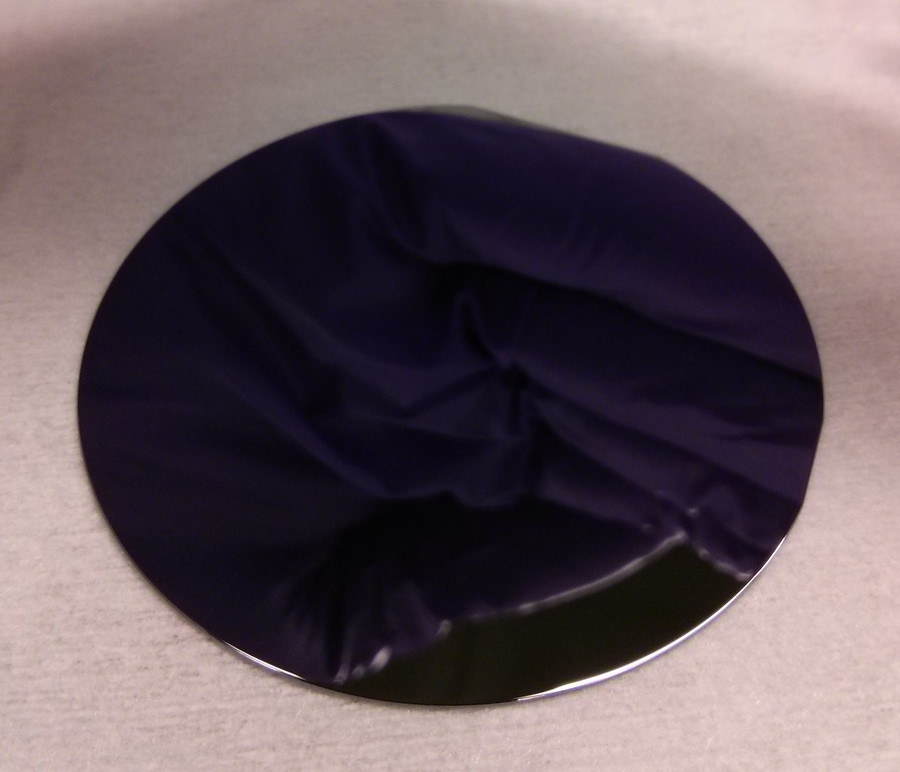
Gallium nitride (left), gallium phosphide (middle) and gallium arsenide (right) wafers

Gallium reacts with ammonia at 1050 °C to form gallium nitride, GaN. Gallium also forms binary compounds with phosphorus, arsenic, and antimony: gallium phosphide (GaP), gallium arsenide (GaAs), and gallium antimonide (GaSb). These compounds have the same structure as ZnS, and have important semiconducting properties. GaP, GaAs, and GaSb can be synthesized by the direct reaction of gallium with elemental phosphorus, arsenic, or antimony. They exhibit higher electrical conductivity than GaN. GaP can also be synthesized by reacting Ga_{2}O with phosphorus at low temperatures.

Gallium forms ternary nitrides; for example:

Li_{3}Ga + N_{2} → Li_{3}GaN_{2}

Similar compounds with phosphorus and arsenic are possible: Li_{3}GaP_{2} and Li_{3}GaAs_{2}. These compounds are easily hydrolyzed by dilute acids and water.

== Halides ==
Gallium(III) oxide reacts with fluorinating agents such as HF or F_{2} to form gallium(III) fluoride, GaF_{3}. It is an ionic compound strongly insoluble in water. However, it dissolves in hydrofluoric acid, in which it forms an adduct with water, GaF_{3}·3H_{2}O. Attempting to dehydrate this adduct forms GaF_{2}OH·nH_{2}O. The adduct reacts with ammonia to form GaF_{3}·3NH_{3}, which can then be heated to form anhydrous GaF_{3}.

Gallium trichloride is formed by the reaction of gallium metal with chlorine gas. Unlike the trifluoride, gallium(III) chloride exists as dimeric molecules, Ga_{2}Cl_{6}, with a melting point of 78 °C. Equivalent compounds are formed with bromine and iodine, Ga_{2}Br_{6} and Ga_{2}I_{6}.

Like the other group 13 trihalides, gallium(III) halides are Lewis acids, reacting as halide acceptors with alkali metal halides to form salts containing GaX^{−}_{4} anions, where X is a halogen. They also react with alkyl halides to form carbocations and GaX^{−}_{4}.

When heated to a high temperature, gallium(III) halides react with elemental gallium to form the respective gallium(I) halides. For example, GaCl_{3} reacts with Ga to form GaCl:

2 Ga + GaCl_{3} ⇌ 3 GaCl (g)

At lower temperatures, the equilibrium shifts toward the left and GaCl disproportionates back to elemental gallium and GaCl_{3}. GaCl can also be produced by reacting Ga with HCl at 950 °C; the product can be condensed as a red solid.

Gallium(I) compounds can be stabilized by forming adducts with Lewis acids. For example:

GaCl + AlCl_{3} → Ga^{+}[AlCl_{4}]^{−}

The so-called "gallium(II) halides", GaX_{2}, are actually adducts of gallium(I) halides with the respective gallium(III) halides, having the structure Ga^{+}[GaX_{4}]^{−}. For example:

GaCl + GaCl_{3} → Ga^{+}[GaCl_{4}]^{−}

== Hydrides ==
Like aluminium, gallium also forms a hydride, GaH_{3}, known as gallane, which may be produced by reacting lithium gallanate (LiGaH_{4}) with gallium(III) chloride at −30 °C:

3 LiGaH_{4} + GaCl_{3} → 3 LiCl + 4 GaH_{3}

In the presence of dimethyl ether as solvent, GaH_{3} polymerizes to (GaH_{3})_{n}. If no solvent is used, the dimer Ga_{2}H_{6} (digallane) is formed as a gas. Its structure is similar to diborane, having two hydrogen atoms bridging the two gallium centers, unlike α-AlH_{3} in which aluminium has a coordination number of 6.

Gallane is unstable above −10 °C, decomposing to elemental gallium and hydrogen.

== Organogallium compounds ==
Organogallium compounds are of similar reactivity to organoindium compounds, less reactive than organoaluminium compounds, but more reactive than organothallium compounds. Alkylgalliums are monomeric. Lewis acidity decreases in the order Al > Ga > In and as a result organogallium compounds do not form bridged dimers as organoaluminium compounds do. Organogallium compounds are also less reactive than organoaluminium compounds. They do form stable peroxides. These alkylgalliums are liquids at room temperature, having low melting points, and are quite mobile and flammable. Triphenylgallium is monomeric in solution, but its crystals form chain structures due to weak intermolecluar Ga···C interactions.

Gallium trichloride is a common starting reagent for the formation of organogallium compounds, such as in carbogallation reactions. Gallium trichloride reacts with lithium cyclopentadienide in diethyl ether to form the trigonal planar gallium cyclopentadienyl complex GaCp_{3}. Gallium(I) forms complexes with arene ligands such as hexamethylbenzene. Because this ligand is quite bulky, the structure of the [Ga(η^{6}-C_{6}Me_{6})]^{+} is that of a half-sandwich. Less bulky ligands such as mesitylene allow two ligands to be attached to the central gallium atom in a bent sandwich structure. Benzene is even less bulky and allows the formation of dimers: an example is [Ga(η^{6}-C_{6}H_{6})_{2}] [GaCl_{4}]·3C_{6}H_{6}.

== See also ==
- Organogallium chemistry
- Category:Gallium compounds
- Aluminium compounds
- Indium compounds
- Germanium compounds
