= Gallium halides =

There are three sets of gallium halides, the trihalides where gallium has oxidation state +3, the intermediate halides containing gallium in oxidation states +1, +2 and +3 and some unstable monohalides, where gallium has oxidation state +1.

== Trihalides ==
All four trihalides are known. They all contain gallium in the +3 oxidation state. Their proper names are gallium(III) fluoride, gallium(III) chloride, gallium(III) bromide and gallium(III) iodide.

GaF_{3}
GaF_{3} is a white solid which sublimes before it melts, with an estimated melting point above 1000 °C. It contains 6 co-ordinate gallium atoms with a three-dimensional network of GaF_{6} octahedra sharing common corners.
GaCl_{3}, GaBr_{3} and GaI_{3}
These all have lower melting points than GaF_{3}, (GaCl_{3} mp 78 °C, GaBr_{3} mp 122 °C, GaI_{3} mp 212 °C) reflecting the fact that their structures all contain dimers with 4 coordinate gallium atoms and 2 bridging halogen atoms. Thus, this halides have molecular formula Ga_{2}Cl_{6}, Ga_{2}Br_{6}, Ga_{2}I_{6}, respectively. They are all Lewis acids, forming mainly 4 co-ordinate adducts. GaCl_{3} is the most commonly used trihalide.

== Intermediate halides ==
Intermediate chlorides, bromides and iodides exist. They contain gallium in oxidation states +1, +2 and +3.

Ga_{3}Cl_{7}

This compound contains the Ga_{2}Cl_{7}^{−} ion, which has a structure similar to the dichromate, Cr_{2}O_{7}^{2−}, ion with two tetrahedrally coordinated gallium atoms sharing a corner. The compound can be formulated as gallium(I) heptachlorodigallate(III), Ga^{I} Ga^{III}_{2}Cl_{7}.

Unit cell of Ga3Cl7	Part of crystal structure of Ga3Cl7	Unit cell of Ga3Cl7
unit cell of Ga_{3}Cl_{7}	part of the crystal structure	structure of [Ga_{2}Cl_{7}]^{−}

GaCl_{2}, GaBr_{2} and GaI_{2}
These are the best known and most studied intermediate halides. They contain gallium in oxidation states +1 and +3 and are formulated Ga^{I}Ga^{III}X_{4}. The dihalides are unstable in the presence of water disproportionating to gallium metal and gallium(III) entities. They are soluble in aromatic solvents, where arene complexes have been isolated and the arene is η^{6} coordinated to the Ga^{+} ion. With some ligands, L, e.g. dioxane, a neutral complex, Ga_{2}X_{2}L_{2}, with a gallium-gallium bond is produced. These compounds have been used as a route into gallium chain and cluster compounds.
Ga_{2}Br_{3} and Ga_{2}I_{3}
These are formulated Ga^{I}_{2} Ga^{II}_{2}Br_{6} and Ga^{I}_{2} Ga^{II}_{2}I_{6} respectively. Both anions contain a gallium-gallium bond where gallium has a formal oxidation state of +2. The Ga_{2}Br_{6}^{2−} anion is eclipsed like the In_{2}Br_{6}^{2−} anion in In_{2}Br_{3} whereas the Ga_{2}I_{6}^{2−} anion is isostructural with Si_{2}Cl_{6} with a staggered conformation.

== Monohalides ==
None of the monohalides are stable at room temperature. The previously reported GaBr and GaI produced from fusing gallium with the trihalide have been shown to be mixtures of metallic gallium with, respectively, Ga_{2}Br_{3} and Ga_{2}I_{3}.

GaCl and GaBr
GaCl and GaBr have been produced in the gas form from the reaction of HX and molten gallium using a special reactor. They have been isolated by quenching the high temperature gas at 77 K. GaCl is reported as a red solid that disproportionates above 0 °C. Both GaCl and GaBr produced in this way can be stabilised in suitable solvents. The metastable solutions formed in this way have been used as precursors to numerous gallium cluster compounds.
In the HVPE production of GaN, GaCl is produced by passing HCl gas over molten gallium which is then reacted with NH_{3} gas.
GaI
GaI is produced as a reactive green powder, which has been hailed as a "versatile reagent for the synthetic chemist". The chemical structure of the reagent termed Solid "GaI" Precursor produced from reacting gallium metal with iodine in toluene using ultrasound has only recently been investigated using 69/71Ga solid-state NMR and a tentative structure assigned which includes gallium metal atoms, [Ga^{0}]_{2}[Ga]^{+}[GaI_{4}]^{−}.

== Anionic halide complexes ==
Salts containing GaCl_{4}^{−}, GaBr_{4}^{−} and GaI_{4}^{−} are all known. Gallium is very different from indium in that it is only known to form 6 coordinate complexes with the fluoride ion. This can be rationalised by the smaller size of gallium (ionic radii of Ga(III) 62 pm, In(III) 80 pm).

Salts containing the Ga_{2}Cl_{6}^{2−} anion, where gallium has an oxidation state of +2, are known.

== General references ==
- WebElements
1. Greenwood, Norman N.; Earnshaw, Alan (1997). Chemistry of the Elements (2nd ed.). Butterworth-Heinemann. doi:10.1016/C2009-0-30414-6. ISBN 978-0-08-037941-8.
2. Cotton, F. Albert; Wilkinson, Geoffrey; Murillo, Carlos A.; Bochmann, Manfred (1999), Advanced Inorganic Chemistry (6th ed.), New York: Wiley-Interscience, ISBN 0-471-19957-5
