= Gallium(III) chloride =

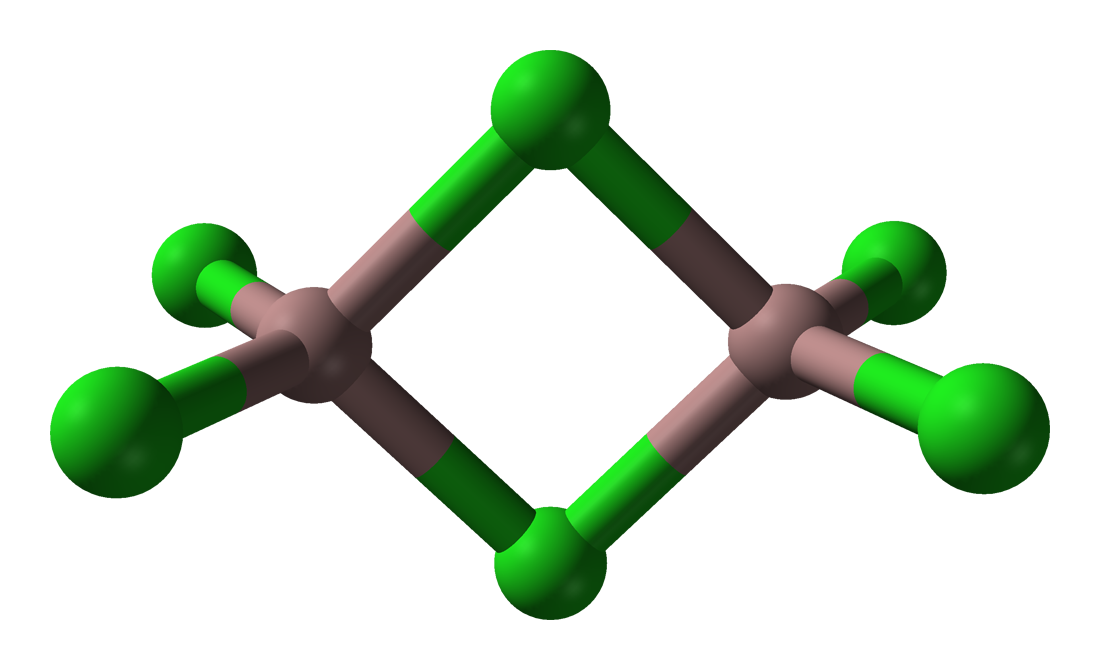

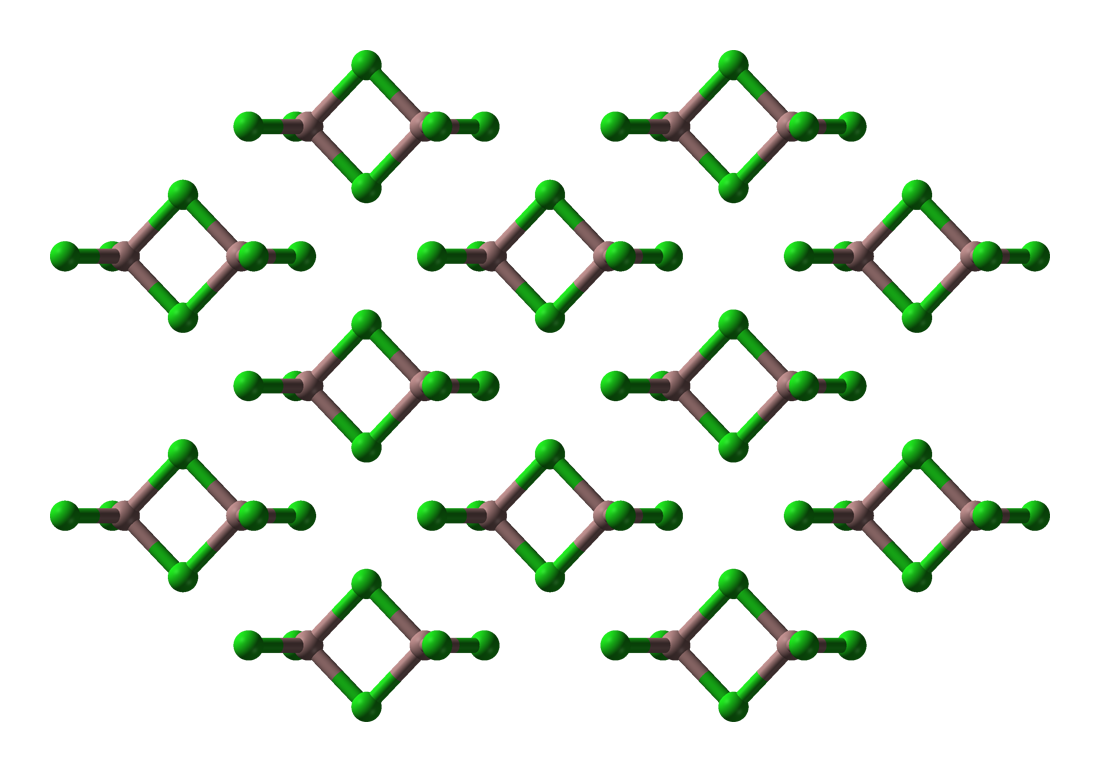

Names
- Other names Gallium trichloride, Trichlorogallium, Trichlorogallane

Identifiers
| CAS Number | 13450-90-3 |
| 3D model (JSmol) | monomer: Interactive image; dimer: Interactive image; monohydrate: Interactive image |
| ChemSpider | 24229 |
| ECHA InfoCard | 100.033.268 |
| PubChem CID | 26010 |
| RTECS number | LW9100000 |
| UNII | 4Y6GQD4915 |
| CompTox Dashboard (EPA) | DTXSID8031360 |
- InChI: InChI=1S/3ClH.Ga/h3*1H;/q;;;+3/p-3 Key: UPWPDUACHOATKO-UHFFFAOYSA-K; InChI=1/3ClH.Ga/h3*1H;/q;;;+3/p-3 Key: UPWPDUACHOATKO-DFZHHIFOAO
- SMILES: monomer: Cl[Ga](Cl)Cl; dimer: Cl[Ga-]1(Cl)[Cl+][Ga-]([Cl+]1)(Cl)Cl; monohydrate: Cl[Ga-](Cl)(Cl)[OH2+]

Properties
| Chemical formula | GaCl_{3} |
| Molar mass | 176.073 g/mol (anhydrous); 194.10 g/mol (monohydrate) |
| Appearance | colorless needle-like crystals |
| Density | 2.47 g/cm^{3} (anhydrous) |
| Melting point | 77.9 °C (172.2 °F; 351.0 K) (anhydrous); 44.4 °C (monohydrate) |
| Boiling point | 201 °C (394 °F; 474 K) (anhydrous) |
| Solubility in water | very soluble, > 80 g/100 mL |
| Solubility | soluble in benzene, CCl_{4}, CS_{2}, and alkanes |
| Magnetic susceptibility (χ) | −63.0·10^{−6} cm^{3}/mol |

Structure
| Crystal structure | monoclinic |
| Space group | C2/m |
| Lattice constant | a = 11.95 Å, b = 6.86 Å, c = 7.05 Å α = 90°, β = 125.7°, γ = 90° |
| Lattice volume (V) | 469 Å^{3} |

Hazards
- Occupational safety and health (OHS/OSH)
| Main hazards | Corrosive. Causes serious eye damage. Causes severe skin burns. |
- GHS labelling
| Pictograms | (GHS05: Corrosive) |
| Signal word | Danger |
| Hazard statements | H290, H314 |
| Precautionary statements | P234, P260, P264, P264+P265, P280, P301+P330+P331, P302+P361+P354, P304+P340, P305+P354+P338, P316, P317, P321, P363, P390, P405, P501 |
| NFPA 704 (fire diamond) | 3 0 1 |
| Flash point | Non-flammable |
- Lethal dose or concentration (LD, LC)
| LD_{50} (median dose) | 4700 mg/kg (rat, oral); 306 mg/kg (rat, subcutaneous); 47 mg/kg (rat, intravenous); 1408 mg/kg (rat, parenteral); 41 mg/kg (dog, intravenous) |

Related compounds
| Other anions | Gallium(III) fluoride; Gallium(III) bromide; Gallium(III) iodide |
| Other cations | Boron trichloride; Aluminium chloride; Indium(III) chloride; Thallium(III) chloride |
| Related compounds | Scandium(III) chloride |
- Except where otherwise noted, data are given for materials in their standard state (at 25 °C [77 °F], 100 kPa). verify (what is ?) Infobox references

Gallium(III) chloride is an inorganic chemical compound with the formula GaCl_{3} which forms a monohydrate, GaCl_{3}·H_{2}O. Solid gallium(III) chloride is a deliquescent with colorless crystals and exists as a dimer with the formula Ga_{2}Cl_{6}. It is colourless and soluble in virtually all solvents, even alkanes, which is unusual for a metal halide. It is the main precursor to most derivatives of gallium and a reagent in organic synthesis.

As a Lewis acid, GaCl_{3} is milder than aluminium chloride. It is also easier to reduce than aluminium chloride. The coordination chemistry of Ga(III) and Fe(III) are similar, so gallium(III) chloride has been used as a diamagnetic analogue of ferric chloride.

== Preparation ==
Gallium(III) chloride can be prepared from the elements by heating gallium metal in a stream of chlorine at 200 °C and purifying the product by sublimation under vacuum.

2 Ga + 3 Cl_{2} → 2 GaCl_{3}

It can also be prepared from by heating gallium oxide with thionyl chloride:

Ga_{2}O_{3} + 3 SOCl_{2} → 2 GaCl_{3} + 3 SO_{2}

Gallium metal reacts slowly with hydrochloric acid, producing hydrogen gas. Evaporation of this solution produces the monohydrate.

== Structure ==
As a solid, it adopts a bitetrahedral structure with two bridging chlorides. Its structure resembles that of aluminium tribromide. In contrast AlCl_{3} and InCl_{3} feature contain 6 coordinate metal centers. As a consequence of its molecular nature and associated low lattice energy, gallium(III) chloride has a lower melting point vs the aluminium and indium(III) halides. The formula of Ga_{2}Cl_{6} is often written as Ga_{2}(μ-Cl)_{2}Cl_{4}.

In the gas-phase, the dimeric (Ga_{2}Cl_{6}) and trigonal planar monomeric (GaCl_{3}) are in a temperature-dependent equilibrium, with higher temperatures favoring the monomeric form. At 870 K, all gas-phase molecules are effectively in the monomeric form.

In the monohydrate, the gallium is tetrahedrally coordinated with three chlorine molecules and one water molecule.

== Properties ==
=== Physical ===
Gallium(III) chloride is a diamagnetic and deliquescent colorless solid that melts at 77.9 °C and boils at 201 °C without decomposition to the elements. This low melting point results from the fact that it forms discrete Ga_{2}Cl_{6} molecules in the solid state. Gallium(III) chloride dissolves in water with the release of heat to form a colorless solution, which when evaporated, produces a colorless monohydrate, which melts at 44.4 °C.

=== Chemical ===
Gallium is the lightest member of Group 13 to have a full d subshell, (gallium has the electronic configuration [Ar] 3d^{10} 4s^{2} 4p^{1}) below the valence electrons that could take part in d subshell π bonding with ligands. The low oxidation state of Ga in Ga(III)Cl_{3}, along with the low electronegativity and high polarisability, allow GaCl_{3} to behave as a "soft acid" in terms of the HSAB theory. The strength of the bonds between gallium halides and ligands have been extensively studied. What emerges is:

- GaCl_{3} is a weaker Lewis acid than AlCl_{3} towards N and O donors, e.g. pyridine
- GaCl_{3} is a stronger Lewis acid than AlCl_{3} towards thioethers e.g. dimethyl sulfide, (CH_{3})_{2}S

With a chloride ion as ligand the tetrahedral tetrachlorogallate(III) ion [GaCl_{4}]^{−} is produced, the 6 coordinate [GaCl_{6}]^{3−} cannot be made. Compounds like K[Ga_{2}Cl_{7}] that have a chloride bridged anion are known. In a molten mixture of KCl and GaCl_{3}, the following equilibrium exists:

2 [GaCl_{4}]^{−} ⇌ [Ga_{2}Cl_{7}]^{−} + Cl^{−}

When dissolved in water, gallium(III) chloride dissociates into the octahedral [Ga(H_{2}O)_{6}]^{3+} and Cl^{−} ions forming an acidic solution, due to the hydrolysis of the hexaaquogallium(III) ion:

[Ga(H_{2}O)_{6}]^{3+} → [Ga(H_{2}O)_{5}OH]^{2+} + H^{+} (pK_{a} = 3.0)

In basic solution, it hydrolyzes to gallium(III) hydroxide, which redissolves with the addition of more hydroxide, possibly to form [Ga(OH)_{4}]^{−}.

== Uses ==
=== Organic synthesis ===
Gallium(III) chloride is a Lewis acid catalyst, such as in the Friedel–Crafts reaction, which is able to substitute more common lewis acids such as ferric chloride. Gallium complexes strongly with π-donors, especially silylethynes, producing a strongly electrophilic complex. These complexes are used as an alkylating agent for aromatic hydrocarbons.

It is also used in carbogallation reactions of compounds with a carbon-carbon triple bond. It is also used as a catalyst in many organic reactions.

=== Organogallium compounds ===
It is a precursor to organogallium reagents. For example, trimethylgallium, an organogallium compound used in MOCVD to produce various gallium-containing semiconductors, is produced by the reaction of gallium(III) chloride with various alkylating agents, such as dimethylzinc, trimethylaluminium, or methylmagnesium iodide.

=== Purification of gallium ===
Gallium(III) chloride is an intermediate in various gallium purification processes, where gallium(III) chloride is fractionally distilled or extracted from acid solutions.

=== Detection of solar neutrinos ===
110 tons of gallium(III) chloride aqueous solution was used in the GALLEX and GNO experiments performed at Laboratori Nazionali del Gran Sasso in Italy to detect solar neutrinos. In these experiments, germanium-71 was produced by neutrino interactions with the isotope gallium-71 (which has a natural abundance of 40%), and the subsequent beta decays of germanium-71 were measured.

== See also ==
- Gallium halides
