= Gallium(I,III) iodide =

Names
- Other names Gallium diiodide

Identifiers
CAS Number	18434-30-5
3D model (JSmol)	Interactive image
ChemSpider	9030538
PubChem CID	10855247
- SMILES: [Ga+].I[Ga-](I)(I)I

Properties
Chemical formula	GaI_{2}
Molar mass	323.53 g/mol
Appearance	Yellow solid
Melting point	211 °C (412 °F; 484 K)
- Except where otherwise noted, data are given for materials in their standard state (at 25 °C [77 °F], 100 kPa). Infobox references

Gallium(I,III) iodide, also known as gallium diiodide, is an inorganic compound of gallium and iodine with the empirical formula GaI_{2}. Despite this formula, it is not a simple gallium(II) compound. In the solid state it is a mixed-valence compound consisting of Ga^{+} cations and tetraiodogallate(III) anions, and is therefore more accurately written Ga^{+}[GaI_{4}]^{−}.

== Properties ==
Gallium(I,III) iodide is a yellow, strongly hygroscopic solid and is diamagnetic. In the molten state it is red.

The compound melts at about 211 °C. Above about 250 °C it readily disproportionates to gallium(I) iodide and gallium(III) iodide.

The empirical formula GaI_{2} conceals its mixed-valence nature. Raman spectroscopy of pure Ga_{2}I_{4} is consistent with an ionic formulation containing Ga^{+} and tetrahedral [GaI_{4}]^{−} ions, rather than discrete Ga(II) centres. The [GaI_{4}]^{−} ion contains Ga(III) tetrahedrally coordinated by four iodide ions.

This structural assignment is also consistent with solid-state spectroscopic studies of low-valent gallium iodide materials, in which GaI_{2} was identified as a significant component and represented as [Ga]^{+}[GaI_{4}]^{−}.

=== Optical ===
In 2025, gallium(I,III) iodide was investigated as an infrared optical material because it combines tetrahedral [GaI_{4}]^{−} anions with monovalent Ga^{+} cations possessing stereochemically active lone pair electrons. Measurements show a weak second-harmonic generation response, attributed to partial cancellation between oppositely oriented [GaI_{4}]^{−} units in the crystal.

== Preparation ==
Gallium(I,III) iodide can be prepared by direct reaction of elemental gallium with iodine at about 350 °C:

Ga + I_{2} → GaI_{2}

It can also be prepared by reduction of mercury(II) iodide with gallium at about 220 °C:

Ga + HgI_{2} → GaI_{2} + Hg

Pure Ga_{2}I_{4} has also been prepared directly from the elements and identified spectroscopically as the ionic compound Ga^{+}[GaI_{4}]^{−}.
