= Arsenate =

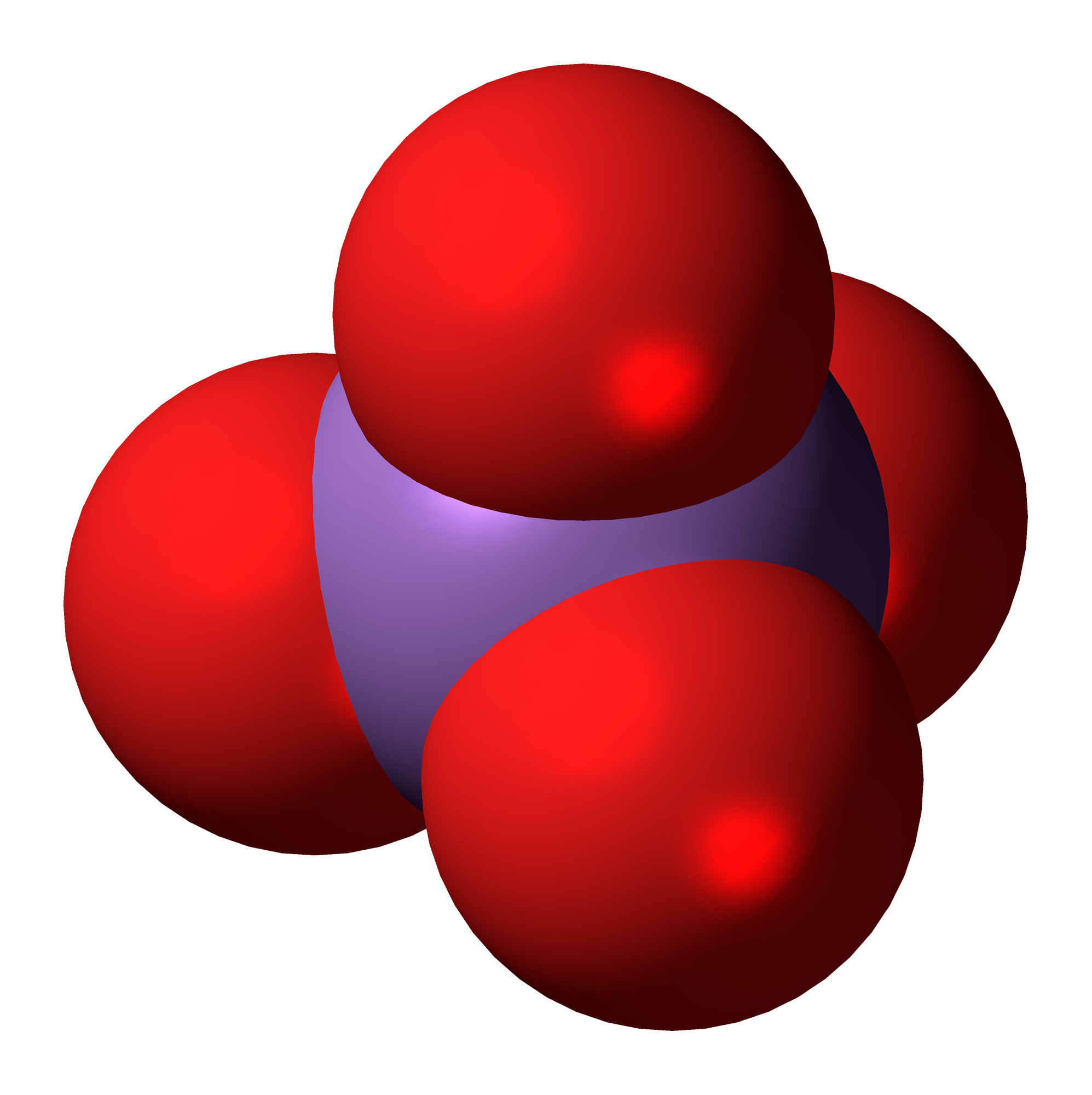

Names
- IUPAC name Arsenate

Identifiers
CAS Number	15584-04-0
3D model (JSmol)	Interactive image
ChemSpider	25498
PubChem CID	27401
UNII	G1DBI405OK
- InChI: InChI=1S/AsH3O4/c2-1(3,4)5/h(H3,2,3,4,5)/p-3 Key: DJHGAFSJWGLOIV-UHFFFAOYSA-K; InChI=1/AsH3O4/c2-1(3,4)5/h(H3,2,3,4,5)/p-3 Key: DJHGAFSJWGLOIV-DFZHHIFOAQ
- SMILES: [O-][As+]([O-])([O-])[O-]

Properties
Chemical formula	AsO^{3−}_{4}
Molar mass	138.918 g·mol^{−1}
Conjugate acid	Arsenic acid

Hazards
- Occupational safety and health (OHS/OSH)
Main hazards	Extremely toxic, carcinogenic
- Except where otherwise noted, data are given for materials in their standard state (at 25 °C [77 °F], 100 kPa). Infobox references

The arsenate is an ion with the chemical formula AsO^{3−}_{4}. Bonding in arsenate consists of a central arsenic atom, with oxidation state +5, double bonded to one oxygen atom and single bonded to a further three oxygen atoms. The four oxygen atoms orient around the arsenic atom in a tetrahedral geometry. Resonance disperses the ion's −3 charge across all four oxygen atoms.

Arsenate readily reacts with metals to form arsenate metal compounds. Arsenate is a moderate oxidizer and an electron acceptor, with an electrode potential of +0.56 V for its reduction to arsenite. Due to arsenic having the same valency and similar atomic radius to phosphorus, arsenate shares similar geometry and reactivity with phosphate. Arsenate can replace phosphate in biochemical reactions and is toxic to most organisms.

== Natural occurrence ==
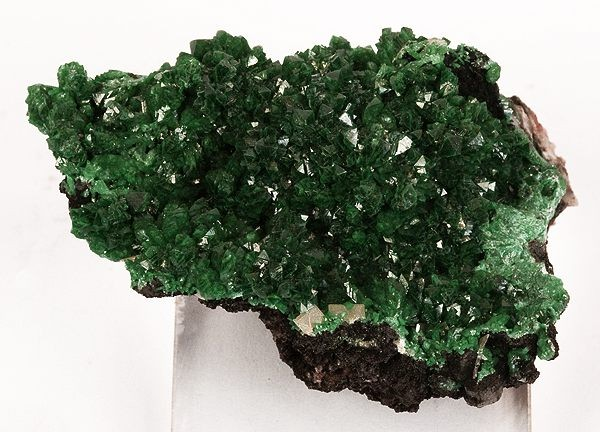
Adamite, a naturally occurring arsenate mineral.

Arsenates occur naturally, in hydrated and anhydrous form, in a variety of minerals. Arsenate minerals usually refer to the naturally occurring orthoarsenates, possessing the (AsO4)3− anion group and, more rarely, other arsenates with anions like AsO3(OH)2− (also written HAsO42−). Examples of arsenate-containing minerals include adamite, alarsite, annabergite, erythrite and legrandite. When two arsenate ions balance the charge in a formula, it is called diarsenate for example zinc diarsenate, Zn_{3}(AsO_{4})_{2}.

== Uses ==
Arsenate-based pesticides such as lead hydrogen arsenate were commonly used until their replacement by newer pesticides such as DDT and subsequent ban by multiple regulatory bodies due to health concerns.

Transition metal arsenate compounds are often brightly coloured and have been used to make pigments. Copper arsenate was a minor compound used in the Egyptian blue pigment used by the ancient Egyptians and Romans. Cobalt violet pigment was made from cobalt arsenate before its toxicity led to its replacement by cobalt phosphate.

Chromated copper arsenate (CCA) has been a widely used wood preservative since the 1930s. Safety concerns have led to the phasing out of CCA-treated wood for residential projects in many countries. CCA remains a common and economical treatment choice for non-residential uses such as agriculture.

== Speciation ==
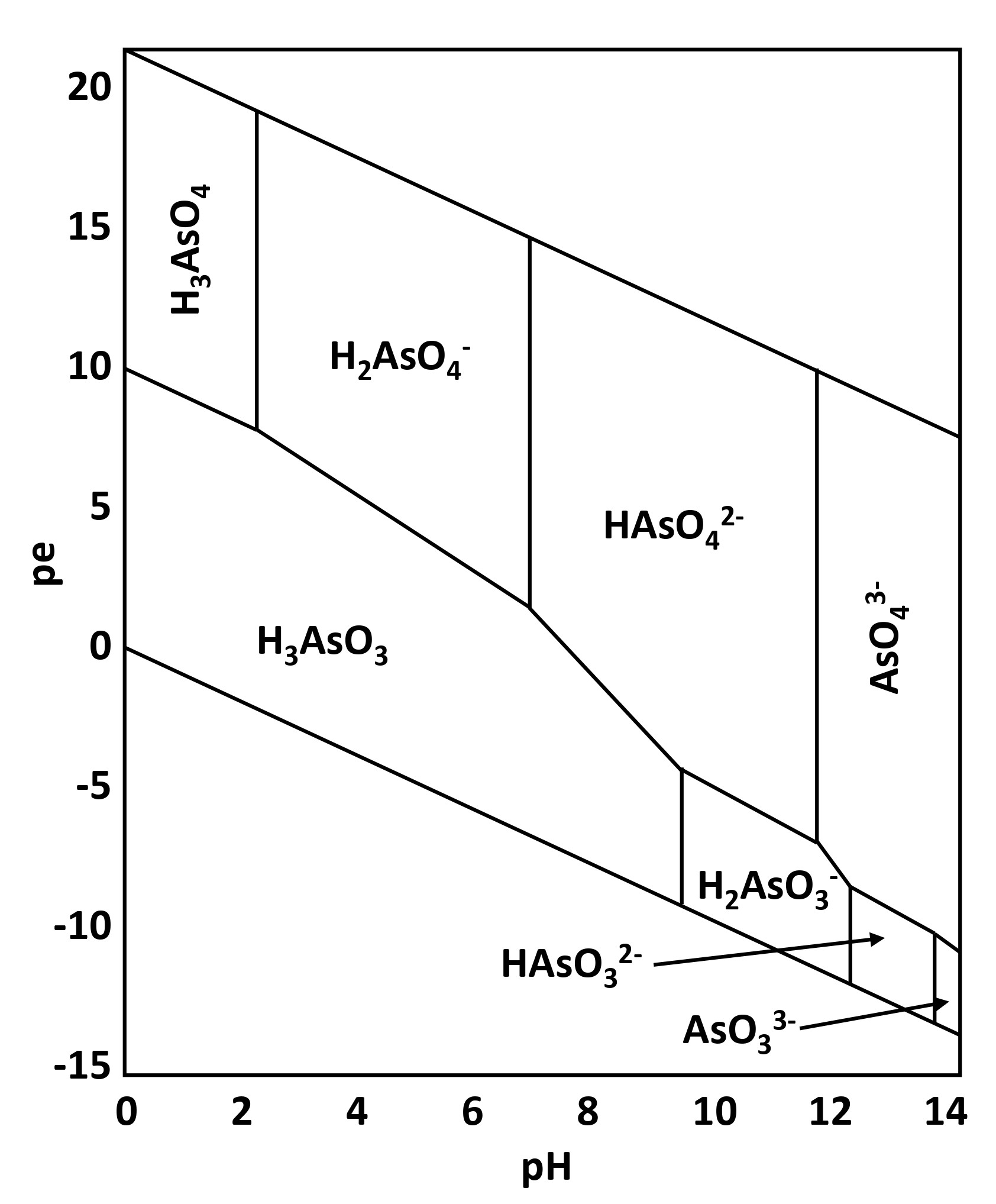
Pourbaix diagram showing the distribution of arsenate and arsenite species in water. Oxygenated waters have a high pe value and arsenate species dominate. In deoxygenated water, with low pe, arsenite species dominate.

Depending on the pH, arsenate can be found as trihydrogen arsenate (that is arsenic acid H_{3}AsO_{4}), dihydrogen arsenate (H_{2}AsO^{−}_{4}), hydrogen arsenate (HAsO^{2−}_{4}), or arsenate (AsO^{3−}_{4}). Trihydrogen arsenate is also known as arsenic acid. At a given pH, the distribution of these arsenate species can be determined from their respective acid dissociation constants.

H_{3}AsO_{4} + H_{2}O ⇌ H_{2}AsO^{−}_{4} + H_{3}O^{+} (pK_{a1} = 2.19)
H_{2}AsO^{−}_{4} + H_{2}O ⇌ HAsO^{2−}_{4} + H_{3}O^{+} (pK_{a2} = 6.94)
HAsO^{2−}_{4} + H_{2}O ⇌ AsO^{3−}_{4} + H_{3}O^{+} (pK_{a3} = 11.5)

These values are similar to those of phosphoric acid. Hydrogen arsenate and dihydrogen arsenate predominate in aqueous solution near neutral pH.

The reduction potential (pe) of a solution also affects arsenate speciation. In natural waters, the dissolved oxygen content is the main factor influencing reduction potential. Arsenates occur in oxygenated waters, which have a high pe, while arsenites are the main arsenic species in anoxic waters with a low pe.

A Pourbaix diagram shows the combined influence of pH and pe on arsenate speciation.

== Contamination ==
Arsenates, along with arsenites, are a significant source of contamination in some natural water sources and can lead to arsenic poisoning with repeated exposure. Countries with high levels of arsenic minerals in sediment and rock, such as Bangladesh, are especially at risk of arsenate contamination.

== Arsenate poisoning ==
Arsenate is harmful to humans and animals as it interferes with the normal functioning of glycolysis and the Krebs cycle. Arsenate replaces inorganic phosphate in the step of glycolysis that produces 1,3-bisphosphoglycerate from glyceraldehyde 3-phosphate. This yields 1-arseno-3-phosphoglycerate instead, which is unstable and quickly hydrolyzes, forming the next intermediate in the pathway, 3-phosphoglycerate. Therefore, glycolysis proceeds, but the ATP molecule that would be generated from 1,3-bisphosphoglycerate is lost – arsenate is an uncoupler of glycolysis, explaining its toxicity.

As with other arsenic compounds, arsenate binds to lipoic acid, inhibiting the conversion of pyruvate into acetyl-CoA, blocking the Krebs cycle and therefore resulting in further loss of ATP.

== See also ==
- Category:Arsenates
