= Strontium tungstate =

Names
- Other names Strontium tungsten oxide

Identifiers
CAS Number	13451-05-3
3D model (JSmol)	Interactive image
ChemSpider	109909
ECHA InfoCard	100.033.275
EC Number	236-617-9
PubChem CID	123306
- InChI: InChI=1S/4O.Sr.W/q;;2*-1;+2; Key: KXELQHMRKFESFN-UHFFFAOYSA-N
- SMILES: [O-][W](=O)(=O)[O-].[Sr+2]

Properties
Chemical formula	SrWO_{4}
Molar mass	335.46 g/mol
Appearance	White solid
Density	6.439 g/cm^{3} (25 °C)
Melting point	1,535 °C (2,795 °F; 1,808 K)

Structure
Crystal structure	Tetragonal, scheelite type
Space group	I4_{1}/a, No. 88
Lattice constant	a = 5.4168 Å, c = 11.951 Å
Lattice volume (V)	350.66 Å^{3}
- Except where otherwise noted, data are given for materials in their standard state (at 25 °C [77 °F], 100 kPa). Infobox references

Strontium tungstate is an inorganic compound with the chemical formula SrWO_{4}. It is a white crystalline solid belonging to the scheelite family of tungstates.

== Structure and properties ==
At ambient pressure, strontium tungstate crystallizes in the tetragonal crystal system with the scheelite structure, in space group I4_{1}/a (No. 88).

The structure contains isolated WO_{4}^{2−} tetrahedra surrounded by Sr^{2+} ions. SrWO_{4} has a density of about 6.44 g/cm^{3} and melts at approximately 1535 °C.

Under pressure, SrWO_{4} undergoes structural phase transitions. A transition from the scheelite structure occurs near 10 GPa, producing a monoclinic high-pressure phase related to the fergusonite structure.

== Preparation ==
Strontium tungstate can be prepared by solid-state reaction of strontium carbonate with tungsten trioxide at high temperature:

SrCO_{3} + WO_{3} → SrWO_{4} + CO_{2}↑

Polycrystalline material prepared by this route can be used as starting material for the growth of SrWO_{4} single crystals.

== Applications ==
Strontium tungstate is used and studied as an optical and luminescent material. SrWO_{4} single crystals have been investigated for Raman laser applications because of their strong Raman-active vibrational modes.

Rare-earth-doped SrWO_{4} materials have been investigated as phosphors. Doping with ions such as Sm^{3+} and Eu^{3+} can produce tunable yellow, orange and red emission for near-ultraviolet- and blue-excited light-emitting devices.
