= 1-Arseno-3-phosphoglycerate =

Chemical compound

Chemical structure of 1-arseno-3-phosphoglycerate

1-Arseno-3-phosphoglycerate is a compound produced by the enzyme glyceraldehyde 3-phosphate dehydrogenase, present in high concentrations in many organisms, from glyceraldehyde 3-phosphate and arsenate in the glycolysis pathway. The compound is unstable and hydrolyzes spontaneously to 3-phosphoglycerate, bypassing the energy producing step of glycolysis.

== Effects on glycolysis ==
1-Arseno-3-phosphoglycerate can be derived from the glycolytic pathway via the bonding of Arsenate and glyceraldehyde-3-phosphate, which is catalyzed by glyceraldehyde phosphate dehydrogenase (GAPDH). The net production of ATP is zero as a result of the formation of the intermediate, 1-arseno-3-phosphoglycerate, as opposed to the conventional pathway, which produces a net result of two ATP molecules.

$\ce{Glyceraldehyde-3-phosphate + AsO4^3- + NAD+ ->[GAPDH] NADH +H+ + 1-Arseno-3-phosphoglycerate}$
