= Arsenic compounds =

Chemical compounds containing arsenic

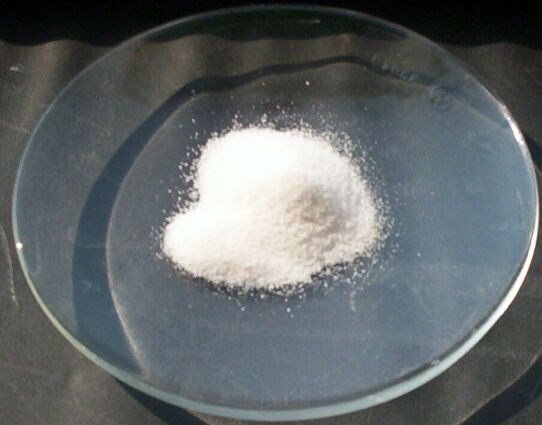
Arsenic trioxide powder.

Compounds of arsenic resemble in some respects those of phosphorus which occupies the same group (column) of the periodic table. The most common oxidation states for arsenic are: −3 in the arsenides, which are alloy-like intermetallic compounds, +3 in the arsenites, and +5 in the arsenates and most organoarsenic compounds. Arsenic also bonds readily to itself as seen in the square As^{3−}_{4} ions in the mineral skutterudite. In the +3 oxidation state, arsenic is typically pyramidal owing to the influence of the lone pair of electrons.

== Inorganic compounds ==
One of the simplest arsenic compounds is the trihydride, the highly toxic, flammable, pyrophoric arsine (AsH_{3}). This compound is generally regarded as stable since, at room temperature, it decomposes only slowly. At temperatures of 250–300 °C decomposition to arsenic and hydrogen is rapid. Several factors, such as humidity, the presence of light and certain catalysts (namely aluminium) facilitate the rate of decomposition. It oxidises readily in the air to form arsenic trioxide and water, and analogous reactions take place with sulfur and selenium instead of oxygen.

Arsenic forms colorless, odorless, crystalline oxides As_{2}O_{3} ("white arsenic") and As_{2}O_{5} which are hygroscopic and readily soluble in water to form acidic solutions. Arsenic(V) acid is a weak acid and the salts are called arsenates, the most common arsenic contamination of groundwater, and a problem that affects many people. Synthetic arsenates include Scheele's Green (cupric hydrogen arsenate, acidic copper arsenate), calcium arsenate, and lead hydrogen arsenate. These three have been used as agricultural insecticides and poisons.

The protonation steps between the arsenate and arsenic acid are similar to those between phosphate and phosphoric acid. Unlike phosphorous acid, arsenous acid is genuinely tribasic, with the formula As(OH)_{3}.

A broad variety of sulfur compounds of arsenic are known. Orpiment (As_{2}S_{3}) and realgar (As_{4}S_{4}) are somewhat abundant and were formerly used as painting pigments. In As_{4}S_{10}, arsenic has a formal oxidation state of +2 in As_{4}S_{4} which features As-As bonds so that the total covalency of As is still 3. Both orpiment and realgar, as well as As_{4}S_{3}, have selenium analogs; the analogous As_{2}Te_{3} is known as the mineral kalgoorlieite, and the anion As_{2}Te^{−} is known as a ligand in cobalt complexes.

All trihalides of arsenic(III) are well known except the astatide, which is unknown. Arsenic pentafluoride (AsF_{5}) is the only important pentahalide, reflecting the lower stability of the +5 oxidation state; even so, it is a very strong fluorinating and oxidizing agent. (The pentachloride is stable only below −50 °C, at which temperature it decomposes to the trichloride, releasing chlorine gas.)

== Alloys ==
Arsenic is used as the group 15 element in the III-V semiconductors gallium arsenide, indium arsenide, and aluminium arsenide. The valence electron count of GaAs is the same as a pair of Si atoms, but the band structure is completely different which results in distinct bulk properties. Other arsenic alloys include the II-V semiconductor cadmium arsenide.

== Organoarsenic compounds ==
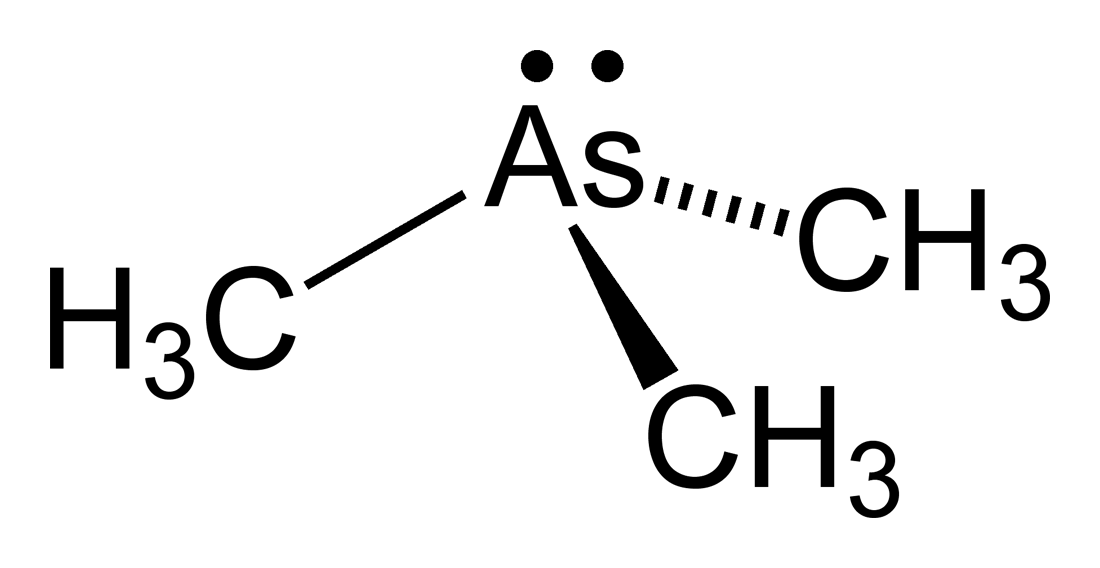
Trimethylarsine

A large variety of organoarsenic compounds are known. Several were developed as chemical warfare agents during World War I, including vesicants such as lewisite and vomiting agents such as adamsite. Cacodylic acid, which is of historic and practical interest, arises from the methylation of arsenic trioxide, a reaction that has no analogy in phosphorus chemistry. Cacodyl was the first organometallic compound known (even though arsenic is not a true metal) and was named from the Greek κακωδία "stink" for its offensive odor; it is very poisonous.

== See also ==
- Category:Arsenic compounds
- Phosphorus compounds
- Antimony compounds
- Germanium compounds
- Selenium compounds
