= Germanium compounds =

Any chemical compound having at least one germanium atom in its structure

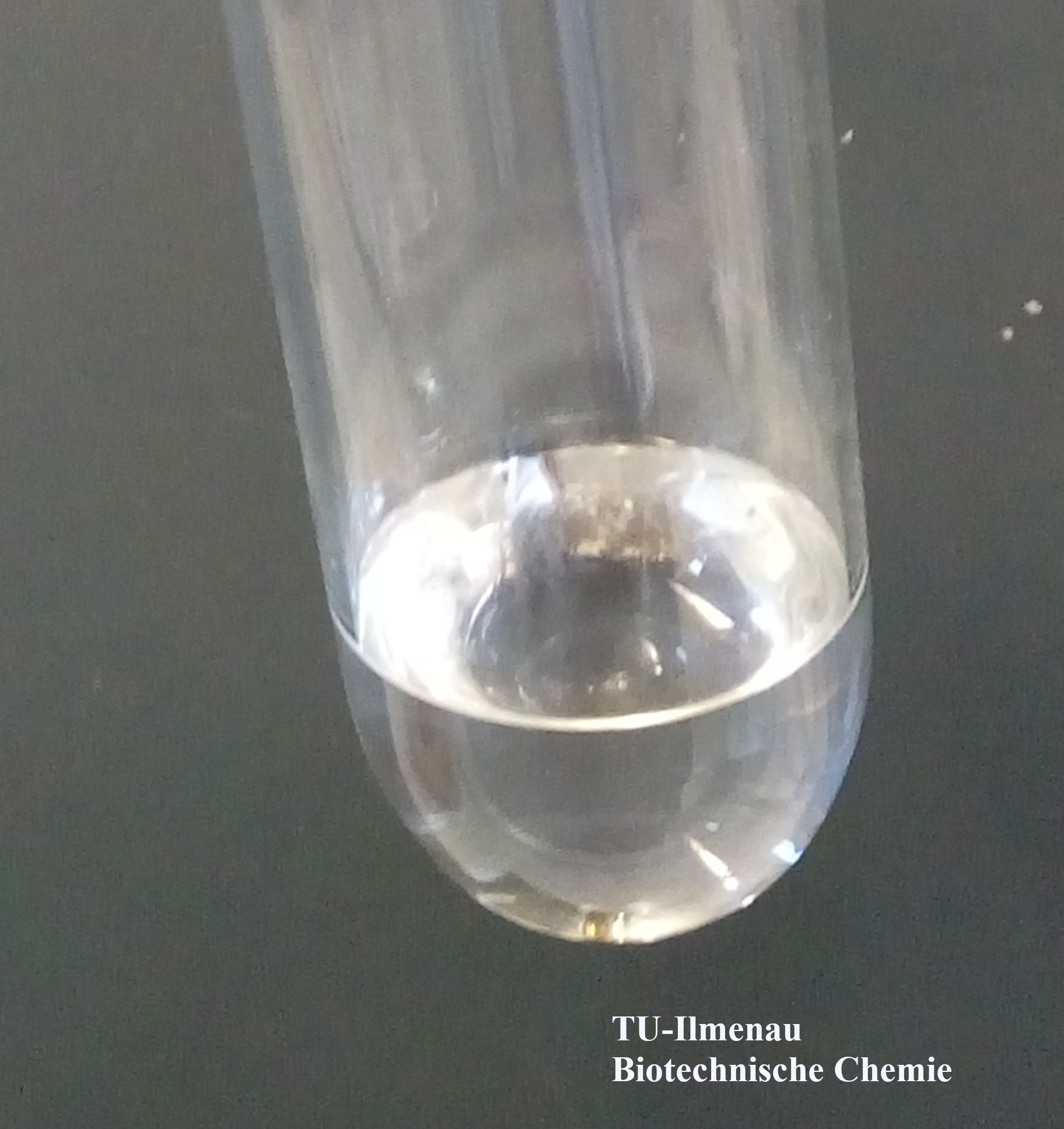
A sample of germanium tetrachloride, a compound of germanium

Germanium compounds are chemical compounds formed by the element germanium (Ge). Germanium is insoluble in dilute acids and alkalis but dissolves slowly in hot concentrated sulfuric and nitric acids and reacts violently with molten alkalis to produce germanates ([GeO_{3}]^{2−}). Germanium occurs mostly in the oxidation state +4 although many +2 compounds are known. Other oxidation states are rare: +3 is found in compounds such as Ge_{2}Cl_{6}, and +3 and +1 are found on the surface of oxides, or negative oxidation states in germanides, such as −4 in Mg_{2}Ge. Germanium cluster anions (Zintl ions) such as Ge_{4}^{2−}, Ge_{9}^{4−}, Ge_{9}^{2−}, [(Ge_{9})_{2}]^{6−} have been prepared by the extraction from alloys containing alkali metals and germanium in liquid ammonia in the presence of ethylenediamine or a cryptand. The oxidation states of the element in these ions are not integers—similar to the ozonides O_{3}^{−}.

== Chalcogenides ==
=== Oxides ===
Two oxides of germanium are known: germanium dioxide (GeO_{2}, germania) and germanium monoxide, (GeO). The dioxide, GeO_{2} can be obtained by roasting germanium disulfide (GeS_{2}) or by allowing elemental germanium to slowly oxidize in air, and is a white powder that is only slightly soluble in water but reacts with alkalis to form germanates. The monoxide, germanous oxide, can be obtained by the high temperature reaction of GeO_{2} with Ge metal. The dioxide (and the related oxides and germanates) exhibits the unusual property of having a high refractive index for visible light, but transparency to infrared light. Bismuth germanate, Bi_{4}Ge_{3}O_{12}, (BGO) is used as a scintillator.

=== Other chalcogenides ===
Binary compounds with other chalcogens are also known, such as the disulfide (GeS_{2}), diselenide (GeSe_{2}), and the monosulfide (GeS), selenide (GeSe), and telluride (GeTe). GeS_{2} forms as a white precipitate when hydrogen sulfide is passed through strongly acid solutions containing Ge(IV). The disulfide is appreciably soluble in water and in solutions of caustic alkalis or alkaline sulfides. Nevertheless, it is not soluble in acidic water, which allowed Winkler to discover the element. By heating the disulfide in a current of hydrogen, the monosulfide (GeS) is formed, which sublimes in thin plates of a dark color and metallic luster, and is soluble in solutions of the caustic alkalis. Upon melting with alkaline carbonates and sulfur, germanium compounds form salts known as thiogermanates.

== Hydrides ==
Germane is similar to methane.

Germane (GeH_{4}) is a compound similar in structure to methane. Polygermanes—compounds that are similar to alkanes—with formula Ge_{n}H_{2n+2} containing up to five germanium atoms are known. The germanes are less volatile and less reactive than their corresponding silicon analogues. GeH_{4} reacts with alkali metals in liquid ammonia to form white crystalline MGeH_{3} which contain the GeH_{3}^{−} anion. The germanium hydrohalides with one, two and three halogen atoms are colorless reactive liquids.

== Halides ==
Four tetrahalides are known. Under normal conditions GeI_{4} is a solid, GeF_{4} a gas and the others volatile liquids. For example, germanium tetrachloride, GeCl_{4}, is obtained as a colorless fuming liquid boiling at 83.1 °C by heating the metal with chlorine. All the tetrahalides are readily hydrolyzed to hydrated germanium dioxide. GeCl_{4} is used in the production of organogermanium compounds. All four dihalides are known and in contrast to the tetrahalides are polymeric solids. Additionally Ge_{2}Cl_{6} and some higher compounds of formula Ge_{n}Cl_{2n+2} are known. The unusual compound Ge_{6}Cl_{16} has been prepared that contains the Ge_{5}Cl_{12} unit with a neopentane structure.

== Organogermanium compounds ==
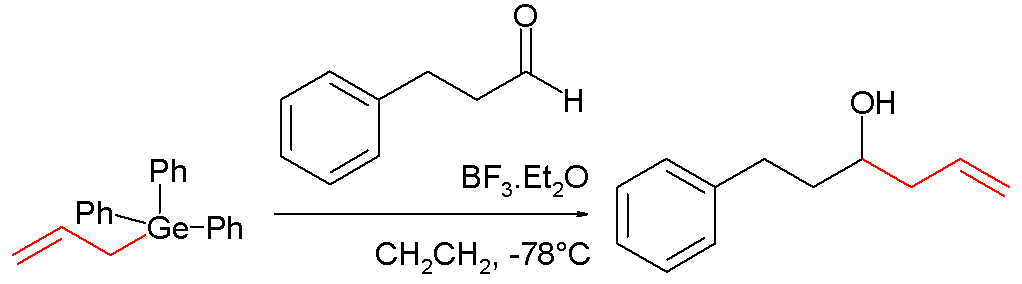
Nucleophilic addition with an organogermanium compound.

The first organogermanium compound was synthesized by Winkler in 1887; the reaction of germanium tetrachloride with diethylzinc yielded tetraethylgermane (Ge(C_{2}H_{5})_{4}). Organogermanes of the type R_{4}Ge (where R is an alkyl) such as tetramethylgermane (Ge(CH_{3})_{4}) and tetraethylgermane are accessed through the cheapest available germanium precursor germanium tetrachloride and alkyl nucleophiles. Organic germanium hydrides such as isobutylgermane ((CH_{3})_{2}CHCH_{2}GeH_{3}) were found to be less hazardous and may be used as a liquid substitute for toxic germane gas in semiconductor applications. Many germanium reactive intermediates are known: germyl free radicals, germylenes (similar to carbenes), and germynes (similar to carbynes). The organogermanium compound 2-carboxyethylgermasesquioxane was first reported in the 1970s, and for a while was used as a dietary supplement and thought to possibly have anti-tumor qualities.

Using a ligand called Eind (1,1,3,3,5,5,7,7-octaethyl-s-hydrindacen-4-yl) germanium is able to form a double bond with oxygen (germanone). Germanium hydride and alkylgermanes are very flammable and even explosive when mixed with air.

== See also ==
- Category:Germanium compounds
- Silicon compounds
- Tin compounds
- Gallium compounds
- Arsenic compounds
