= Gallium monoiodide =

Identifiers
CAS Number	15605-68-2
3D model (JSmol)	Interactive image
ChemSpider	9138803
PubChem CID	10963591
- InChI: InChI=1S/Ga.HI/h;1H/q+1;/p-1 Key: LRPWSMQGXLANTG-UHFFFAOYSA-M
- SMILES: [Ga]I

Properties
Chemical formula	GaI
Molar mass	196.63 g/mol
Appearance	Pale green solid
Solubility in water	Hydrolysis
- Except where otherwise noted, data are given for materials in their standard state (at 25 °C [77 °F], 100 kPa). Infobox references

Gallium monoiodide is an inorganic gallium compound with the formula GaI or Ga_{4}I_{4}. It is a pale green solid and mixed valent gallium compound, which can contain gallium in the 0, +1, +2, and +3 oxidation states. It is used as a pathway for many gallium-based products. Unlike the gallium(I) halides first crystallographically characterized, gallium monoiodide has a more facile synthesis allowing a synthetic route to many low-valent gallium compounds.

== Synthesis ==
In 1990, Malcolm Green synthesized gallium monoiodide by the ultrasonication of liquid gallium metal with iodine in toluene yielding a pale green powder referred to as gallium monoiodide. The chemical composition of gallium monoiodide was not determined until the early to mid-2010s despite its simple synthesis.

In 2012, the pale green gallium monoiodide was determined to be a combination of gallium metal and gallium(I,III) iodide, having the chemical composition [Ga^{0}]_{2}[Ga^{+}][GaI_{4}^{−}]. However, in 2014, it was found that the incomplete reaction of gallium metal with iodine yielded gallium monoiodide with this chemical composition. Gallium monoiodide synthesized with longer reaction times for complete reaction had a different chemical composition [Ga^{0}]_{2}[Ga^{+}]_{2}[Ga_{2}I_{6}^{2-}].

The resultant gallium monoiodide is highly air sensitive, but stable under inert atmosphere conditions for up to a year at -35 ˚C.

== Characterization ==
When gallium monoiodide was first produced, it was proposed that gallium monoiodide is a combination of gallium metal, Ga_{2}I_{3} and Ga_{2}I_{4} based on the characteristic Raman spectra of these constituents. This hypothesis was confirmed as two variants of gallium monoiodide were determined to have the chemical compositions [Ga^{0}]_{2}[Ga^{+}][GaI_{4}^{−}], simplified as Ga_{2}I_{4}·2Ga, and [Ga^{0}]_{2}[Ga^{+}]_{2}[Ga_{2}I_{6}^{2-}], simplified as Ga_{2}I_{3}·Ga.

When the incompletely reacted product was probed by NMR spectroscopy, it showed the presence gallium metal. When probed by ^{127}I NQR, it showed the presence of Ga_{2}I_{4} and further confirms the [Ga^{0}]_{2}[Ga^{+}][GaI_{4}^{−}] assignment. Raman spectroscopy has also confirmed this composition assignment. All of the evidence from other spectroscopic methods, and power x-ray diffraction patterns, validates the assignment of [Ga^{0}]_{2}[Ga^{+}][GaI_{4}^{−}] for the incompletely reacted gallium monoiodide variant.

When the completely reacted product was probed by ^{127}I NQR, it showed the presence of Ga_{2}I_{3}. Raman spectroscopy has also confirmed this assignment, as it aligned with those from a Ga_{4}I_{6} reference. Finally, power x-ray diffraction supports that this gallium monoiodide variant matches that of characteristic Ga_{2}I_{3,} which is different from that of GaI_{2}.

[Ga^{0}]_{2}[Ga^{+}][GaI_{4}^{−}] converts to [Ga^{0}]_{2}[Ga^{+}]_{2}[Ga_{2}I_{6}^{2-}] over time.

== Reactions and derivatives ==
Gallium monoiodide is used as a precursor for a variety of reactions, acting as a lewis acid and a reducing agent. Early-on, gallium monoiodide was shown to produce alkylgallium diiodides via oxidative addition by reacting liquid gallium metal and iodine in the presence of an alkyl iodide. Since then, other organogallium complexes have been synthesized, as well as Lewis base adducts and gallium based clusters.

=== Gallium Lewis base adducts ===
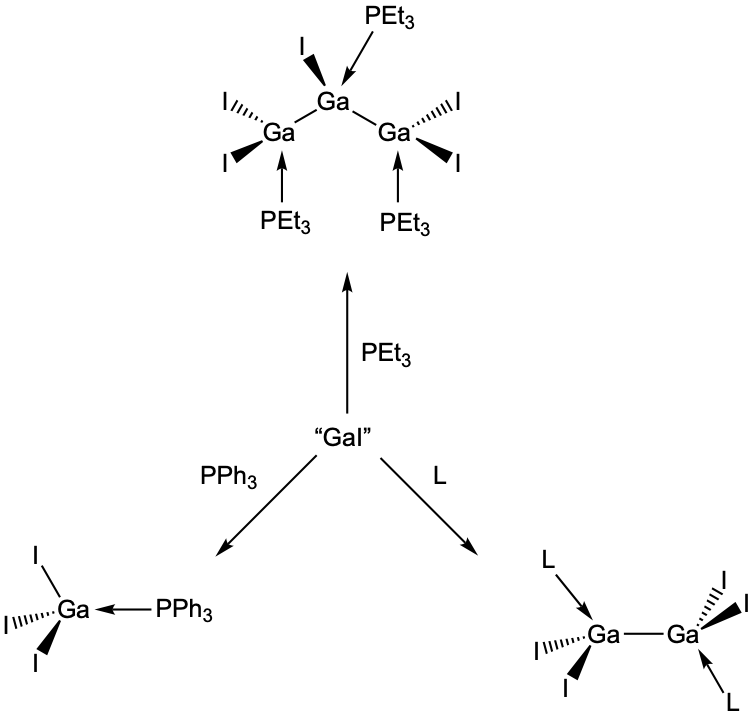
Reaction pathways of various gallium monoiodide Lewis base adducts. Reactions were conducted in toluene at - 78 ˚C. (L = phosphines, ethers, amines).

Gallium monoiodide reacts with various monodentate Lewis bases to form Ga(II), Ga(III), or mixed valent compounds, as well as gallium-based dimers and trimers. For example, gallium monoiodide can react with primary, secondary, and tertiary amines, secondary or tertiary phosphines or ethers to form Ga(II)-Ga(II) dimers. Gallium monoiodide can also react with triphenylphosphine (PPh_{3}) to form Ga(III)I_{3}PPh_{3}. It also reacts with the less sterically hindered triethylphosphine (PEt_{3}) to form a Ga(II)-Ga(I)-Ga(II) mixed valent complex with datively coordinated PEt_{3} ligands. These reactions are believed to be a disproportionation, as gallium metal is produced in these reactions.

Gallium monoiodide reacts with triphenylstibine to produce an SbPh_{3} fragment datively bonded to a GaPhI_{2} fragment. The difference in reactivity between PPh_{3} and SbPh_{3}, a heavy atom analogue of PPh_{3}, can be attributed to a weaker Sb-C bond, allowing for transfer of a phenyl group from antimony to gallium. This suggests that gallium monoiodide can be used as a reducing agent as well.

N-heterocyclic carbenes reacts with gallium monoiodide to form a complex with a sterically hindered isopropyl ligand. However, gallium monoiodide reacts with diazabutadienes and subsequent reduction by potassium metal to form Ga analogs of N-heterocyclic carbenes. Other Ga-based carbenes can be produced from gallium monoiodide precursor using Li(NacNac).

Gallium monoiodide reacts with multidentate Lewis bases, such as bipyridine, phenyl-terpyridine, and bis(imino)pyridine ligands to form Ga(III) complexes. Crystallographically, the bipyridine derivative has a distorted octahedral geometry, with a Ga–N bond length of 2.063 Å. The phenyl-terpyridine derivative adopts a distorted trigonal bipyramidal geometry where the two equatorial Ga–N bonds (as drawn) are longer than the axial Ga-N bond, with 2.104 Å and 2.007(5) Å, respectively. The average Ga-N bond length (2.071 Å) is similar to that of a neutral GaCl_{3}(terpy) Lewis base adduct (2.086 Å). The bis(imino)pyridine derivative has a distorted square-based pyramidal geometry. Like for the phenyl-terpyridine derivative, the equatorial imino Ga-N bonds (2.203 Å) are longer than the axial pyridyl Ga-N bond (2.014(7) A˚). Despite these similar reactivities and bond characteristics, when gallium monoiodide was reacted with imino-substituted pyridines (RN=C(H)Py), unique reactivity was observed. Reductive coupling of the imino-substituted pyridines formed diamido-digallium(III) complexes. These reactions display the ability of gallium monoiodides to form new C-C bonds.

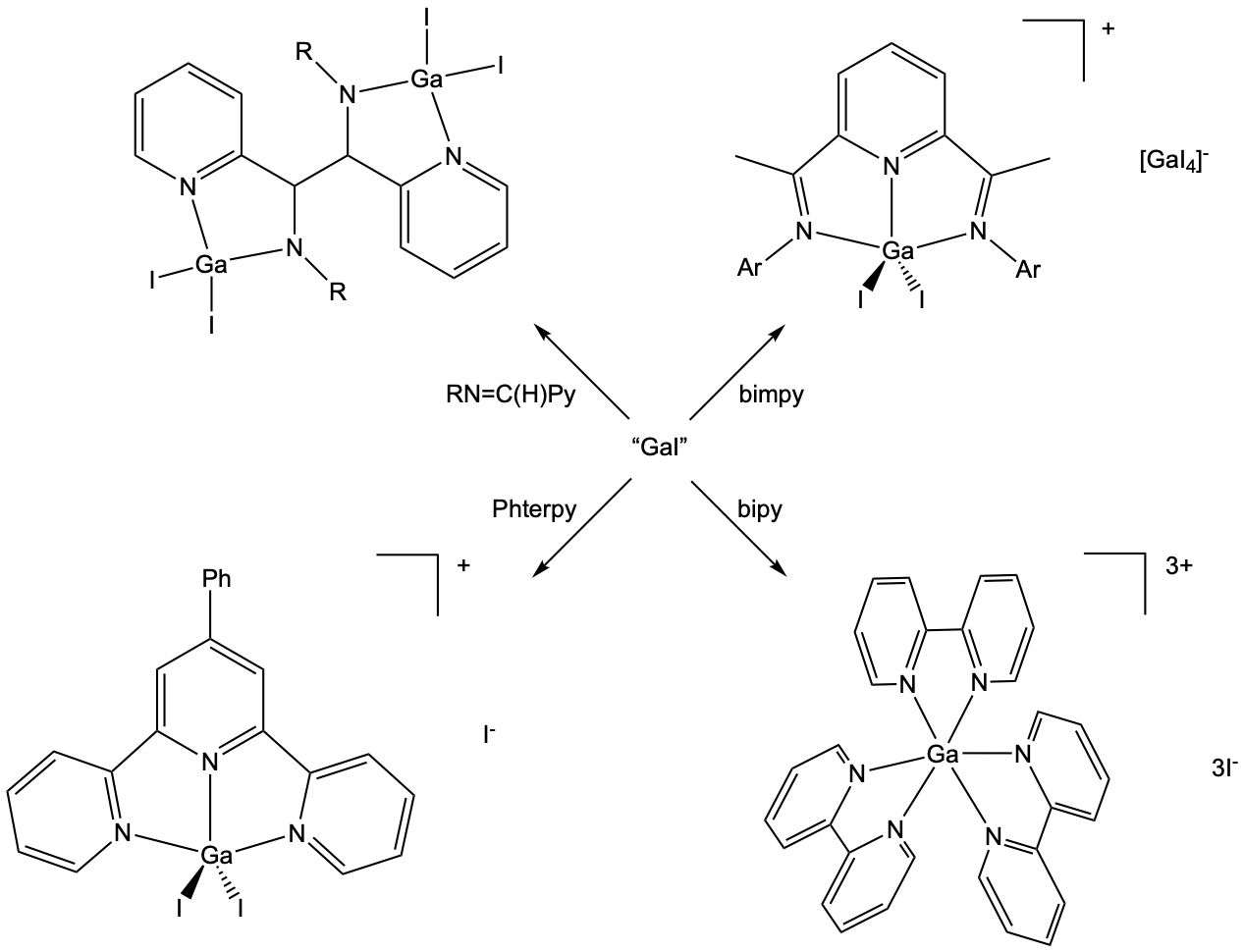
Reaction pathways with gallium monoiodide and polydentate Lewis bases form Ga(III) salts (R = Ar, Bu^{t}; Ar = C_{6}H_{3}Pr^{i}_{2}-2,6; Py = 2-pyridyl). Reactions were conducted in toluene at - 78 ˚C. Only the bis(imino)pyridine derivative was reacted at 25 ˚C. All complexes have been crystallographically characterized.

=== Gallium heterocycles ===
Gallium monoiodide can also be used as a precursor to form gallium-based heterocycles. Reactions with diazabutadienes, {RN=C(H)}_{2}, forms monomers or dimers based on the substituents on the diazabutadienes. More sterically hindered substituents such as tert-butyl have resulted in the formation of gallium(II) dimers, whereas reactions with alkyl or aryl substituted diazabutadienes have formed Ga(III) monomers. Gallium monoiodide can be reacted with phenyl-substituted 1,4-diazabuta-1,3-dienes to form a gallium heterocycle with a diazabutadiene monoanion. EPR spectroscopy has revealed that the diazabutadiene fragment is a paramagnetic monoanionic species rather than an ene-diamido dianion or a neutral ligand. Thus, gallium monoiodide undergoes a disproportionation reaction to form a gallium(III) complex with deposition of a gallium metal. Upon further reaction with a 1,4-dilithiated diazabutadiene, this gallium heterocycle forms a new complex with the diazabutadiene monoanion fragment datively bonded to the gallium center and an ene-diamido dianion covalently bonded to the Ga center.

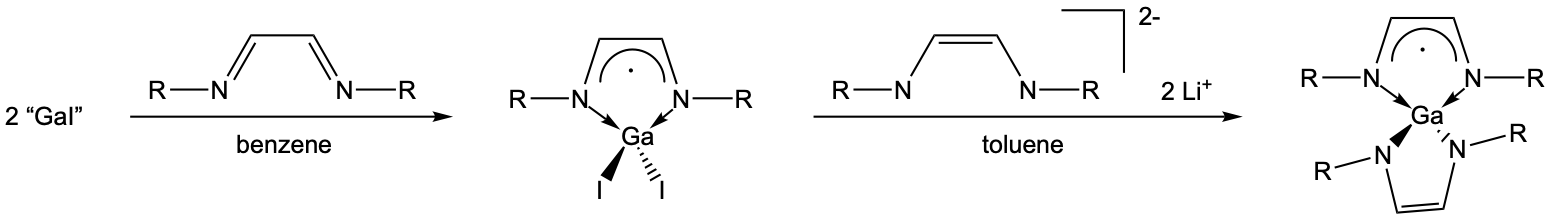
Ga heterocycles formed from the reaction of gallium monoiodide with 1,4-diazabuta-1,3-dienes. R = 2,6-dimethylphenyl; 2,4,6-trimethylphenyl; 2,6-diisopropylphenyl. For the 1,4-dilithiated diazabutadiene reagent, R = 2,6-dimethylphenyl.

One very important reactivity of this gallium(III) heterocycle is its ability to access gallium analogues of N-heterocyclic carbenes upon reduction with potassium metal. Although a gallium analogue of N-heterocyclic carbenes had been synthesized previously, having access to heavier analogues of N-heterocylic carbenes from a synthetically more facile gallium monoiodide route has opened new avenues in coordination chemistry, such as access to new Ga-M bonds.

Gallium monoiodide can also be used to access six-membered gallium(I) heterocycles that have parallels to gallium analogues of N-heterocyclic carbenes. These neutral gallium(I) heterocycles can be synthesized by reacting gallium monoiodide and Li[nacnac].

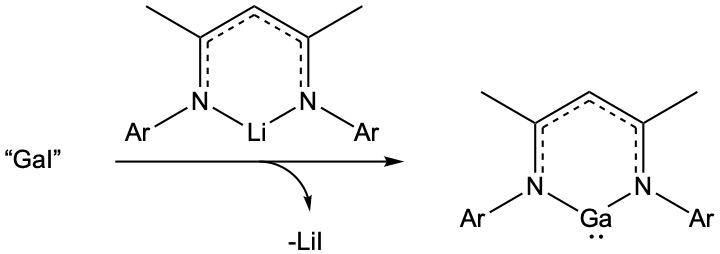
Reaction of gallium monoiodide (slurry) and Li[nacnac] in a dry ice/acetone bath to access a gallium(I) heterocycle. Excess potassium metal can be added to circumvent a Ga(II) derivative of the six-member gallium(I) heterocycle. Ar = Dipp.

=== Cyclopentadienyl complexes ===
Gallium monoiodide can easily be converted to half-sandwich complexes, (pentamethylcyclopentadienyl)gallium(I) and cyclopentadienylgallium. (Pentamethylcyclopentadienyl)gallium(I) can be easily produced by reacting gallium monoiodide with a potassium salt of the desired ligand under toluene to avoid side products.

Cyclopentadienylgallium, which is less sterically hindered than (pentamethylcyclopentadienyl)gallium(I), can also be accessed using a gallium monoiodide. This ligand can be synthesized with a metathesis reaction of NaCp with gallium monoiodide. This cyclopentadienylgallium ligand has been used to access a GaCp_{2}I complex with datively bonded cyclopentadienylgallium. This complex showcases an uncommon donor-acceptor Ga-Ga bond. Cyclopentadienylgallium can also be used to access a Lewis acid B(C_{6}F_{5})_{3} complex with a datively bonded cyclopentadienylgallium ligand. For both of these two complexes, the (pentamethylcyclopentadienyl)gallium(I) analogues have been synthesized and x-ray crystallography has supported that, as expected, (pentamethylcyclopentadienyl)gallium(I) is a slightly stronger donor than cyclopentadienylgallium.

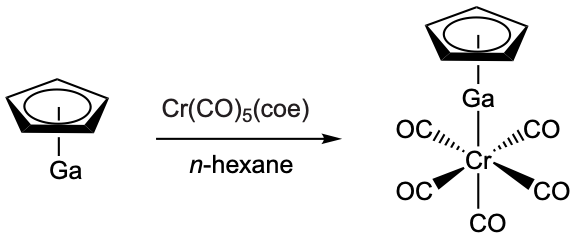
GaCp reacts with Cr(CO)_{5}(cyclooctene) to form a new CpGa–Cr(CO)_{5}. The GaCp* analogue can also be accessed.

Like (pentamethylcyclopentadienyl)gallium(I), cyclopentadienylgallium can also coordinate to transition metal complexes such as Cr(CO)_{5}(cyclooctene) or Co_{2}(CO)_{8} to yield CpGa–Cr(CO)_{5} or (thf)GaCp{Co(CO)_{4}}_{2}. For CpGa–Cr(CO)_{5}, the Ga-Cr bond length (239.6 pm) is similar to that for a (pentamethylcyclopentadienyl)gallium(I) analogue (240.5 pm). For this complex, the trans effect is also observed, where the Cr-CO bond trans to the cyclopentadienylgallium ligand is contracted (186 pm) relative to the cis Cr-CO bonds (189.5 pm). While cyclopentadienylgallium can act as a terminal ligand similar to (pentamethylcyclopentadienyl)gallium(I), it was determined that cyclopentadienylgallium analogues react faster than their (pentamethylcyclopentadienyl)gallium(I) counterparts. This can be attributed to the lower steric bulk of cyclopentadienylgallium.

Unlike reactivity with Cr(CO)_{5}(cyclooctene), reactivities of (pentamethylcyclopentadienyl)gallium(I) and cyclopentadienylgallium with Co_{2}(CO)_{8} diverge significantly. Dicobalt octacarbonyl, or Co_{2}(CO)_{8}, exists in various isomeric states. One such isomer contains two bridging CO ligands. When (pentamethylcyclopentadienyl)gallium(I) reacts with Co_{2}(CO)_{8}, two equivalents of CO gas are released, forming (CO)_{3}Co[μ_{2}-(η_{5}-GaCp*)]_{2}-Co(CO)_{3}. This is a derivative of the dicobalt octacarbonyl complex where the bridging CO moieties are replaced by bridging (pentamethylcyclopentadienyl)gallium(I) moieties. On the other hand, cyclopentadienylgallium enables oxidative addition to Co_{2}(CO)_{8} to form (thf)GaCp{Co(CO)_{4}}_{2}, where gallium has sigma interactions to two Co(CO)_{4} units. The average Ga–Co bond length is 248.5 pm and gallium is in a formally +3 oxidation state in this new complex. Overall, straightforward synthesis of cyclopentadienylgallium from a gallium monoiodide precursor has many merits in expanding the scope of transition metal chemistry with lower valent species.

=== Gallium clusters ===
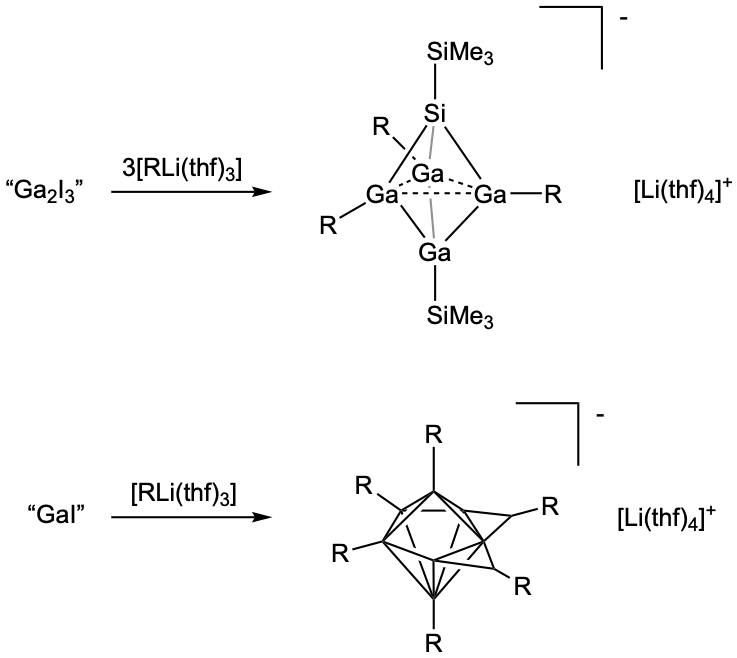
Examples of Ga clusters synthesized from variants of gallium monoiodide starting materials. R = Si(SiMe_{3})_{3}. For the [Ga_{9}{Si(SiMe_{3})_{3}}_{6}]^{−} cluster, the polyhedral vertices are all Ga. Reactions were conducted in toluene at -78 ˚C.

A variety of gallium clusters have also been synthesized from gallium monoiodide. These clusters have often been isolated as salts with bulky silyl or germyl anions, such as [Si(SiMe_{3})_{3}]^{−}. An example of an isolated gallium cluster is [Ga_{9}{Si(SiMe_{3})_{3}}_{6}]^{−}, which has a pentagonal bipyramidal polyhedral structure. It is synthesized by reacting gallium monoiodide with Li(thf)_{3}Si(SiMe_{3})_{3} in toluene at -78 ˚C. This reaction has been shown to access a wide array of products, which may be attributed to the wide range of gallium monoiodide compositions that have been subsequently probed. Of these products, [Ga_{9}{Si(SiMe_{3})_{3}}_{6}]^{−} is especially unique because Ga was found to have a very low average oxidation state (0.56) and also because this cluster has fewer R substituents than polyhedron vertices. Other clusters that been isolated via similar reaction pathways include [Ga_{10}{Si(SiMe_{3})_{3}}_{6}], which is a conjuncto-polyhedral cluster, and a closo-silatetragallane anion, which contains three 2-electron-2-center and three 2-electron-3-center bonds. Interestingly, this latter species can only be synthesized when sub-stoichiometric quantities of I_{2} are utilized to access a "Ga_{2}I_{3}" intermediate species. This is equivalent to reacting liquid gallium metal and iodine to pre-completion, which, as explained above, accesses the [Ga^{0}]_{2}[Ga^{+}]_{2}[Ga_{2}I_{6}^{2-}] variant of gallium monoiodide. This highlights the versatility of the gallium monoiodide precursor in accessing a wide range of gallium-based complexes.

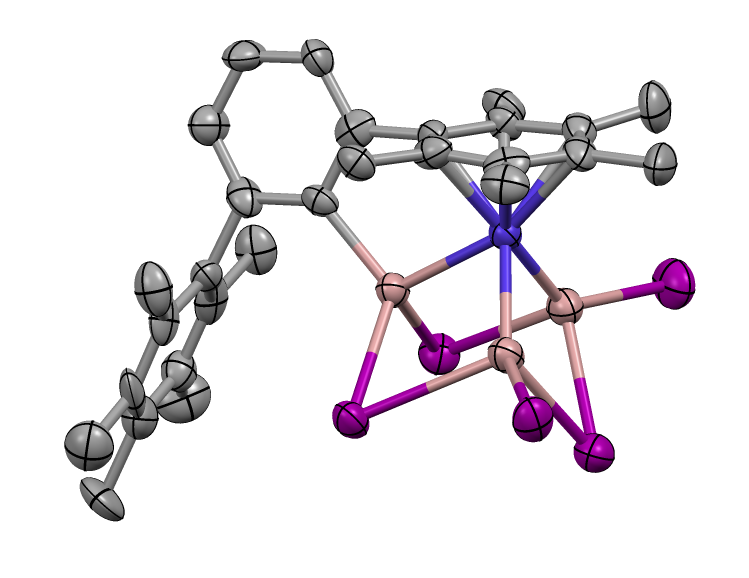
Reaction of a diaryl Co(II) precursor with gallium monoiodide yields a nido-type Co-GaI cluster. Ellipsoids set at 50% probability. Grey = carbon, blue = cobalt, pink = gallium, and magenta = iodine. Hydrogens not depicted. Image recreated using .cif file (deposited to The Cambridge Structural Database).

Gallium monoiodide can also form cluster-type compounds with transition metals precursors. One example is the reaction between gallium monoiodide and (2,6-Pmp_{2}C_{6}H_{3})_{2}Co, (Pmp = C_{6}Me_{5}), which yields a nido-type cluster. This molecule is structurally similar to cubane, where the corners are metal and bridging iodine atoms, with one corner removed. This is a particularly unique Co-GaI cluster due to its unusual geometry for transition metal compounds containing heavy group 13 atoms such as gallium. The bond critical points and bond paths, as computed with QTAIM analysis, support that while there are Co-Ga bonds, there are no Ga-Ga bonds.

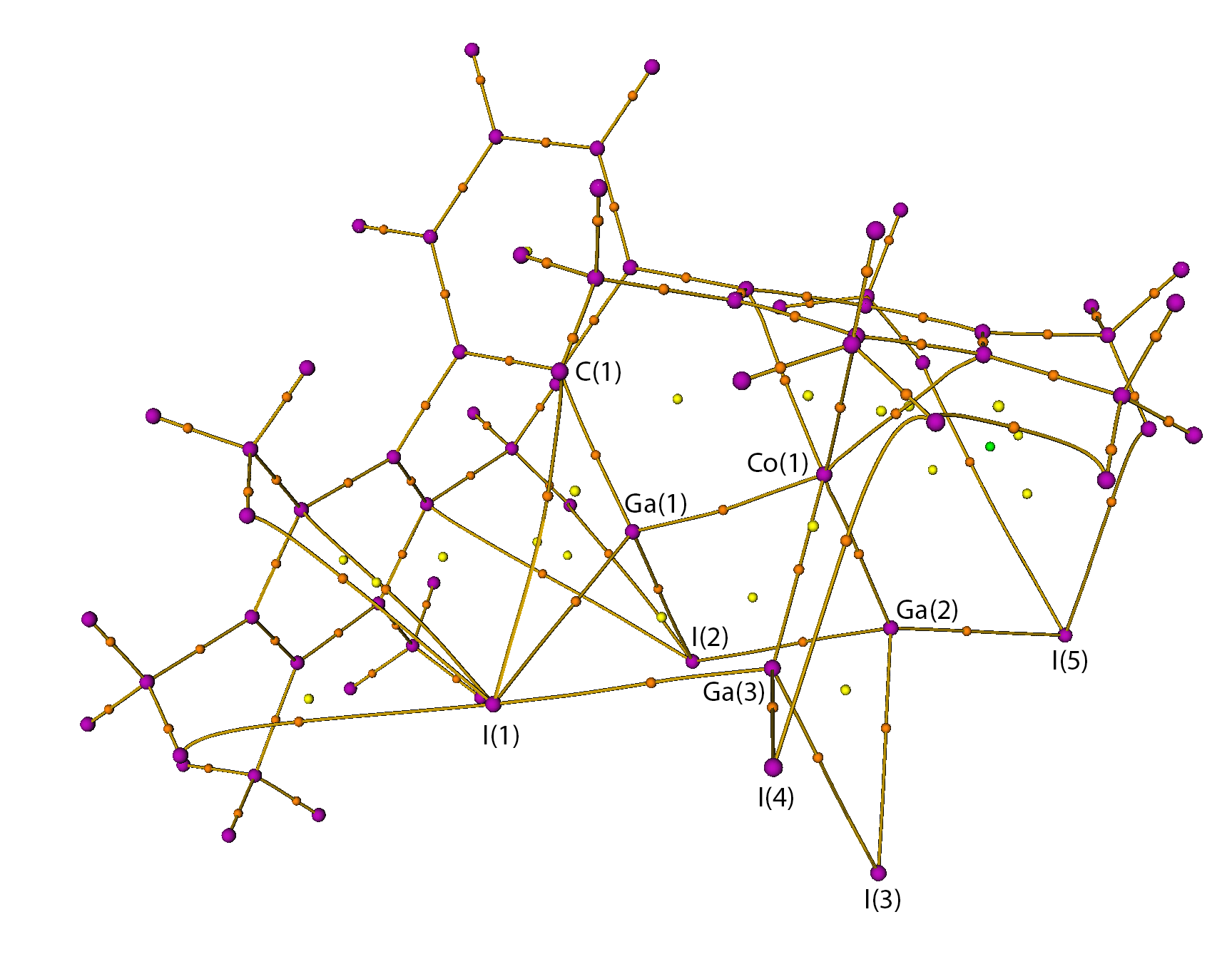
Bond critical points and bond paths of a Co-GaI cluster. using Multiwfn 3.8 software.

Finally, gallium monoiodide has been able to form clusters with heavy gold atoms by acting as a reducing reagent when combined with (pentamethylcyclopentadienyl)gallium(I) and triphenylphosphine-gold complexes(i.e. AuI(PPh_{3}) or AuCl(PPh_{3})). This cluster contained the first crystallographically confirmed Ga-Au bonds, consisting of a Au_{3} cluster ligated by Ga ligands. In addition, NBO analysis showed that the charge on the galliums within the (pentamethylcyclopentadienyl)gallium(I) ligands were much higher than the charge on the Au atoms and the charge on the gallium atoms within the GaI_{2} motifs. This suggests that non-bridging Ga-Au bonds are highly polarized, whereas the μ-bridging Ga-Au bonds are more non-polar covalent in character.

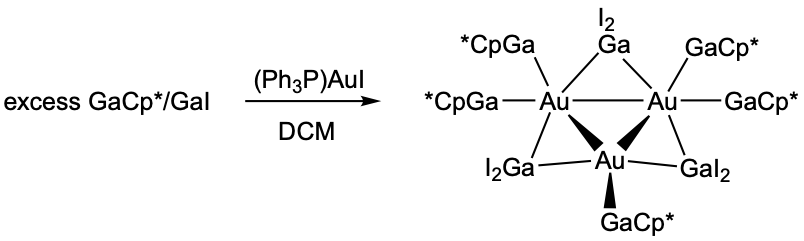
Ga-Au cluster formed by dropwise addition of LAuX to a mixture of GaCp*/"GaI" (excess) in dichloromethane.

== See also ==
- Gallium(III) iodide
- Persistent carbene
