= Cobalt(II) phosphate =

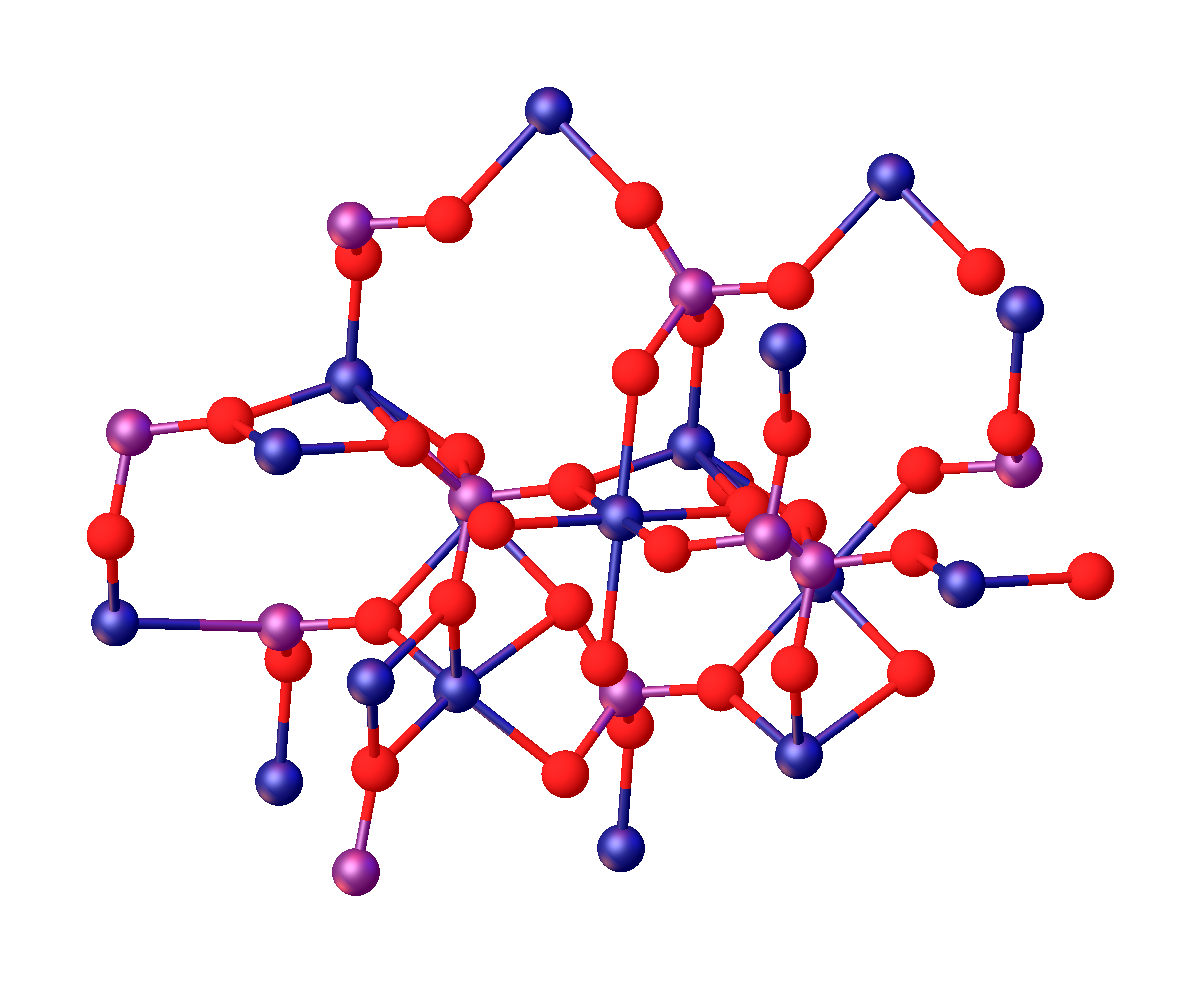

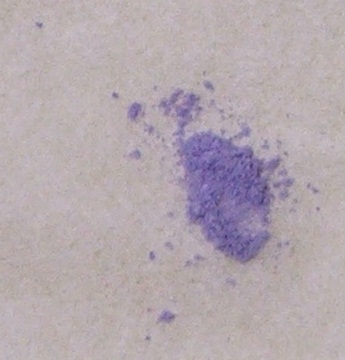

Names
- Other names: Cobalt violet; Cobalt(II) phosphate; Cobalt orthophosphate; Pigment Violet 14

Identifiers
CAS Number	(tetrahydrate: 10294-50-5) 13455-36-2 (tetrahydrate: 10294-50-5)
3D model (JSmol)	Interactive image
ChemSpider	55523
ECHA InfoCard	100.033.309
EC Number	236-655-6
PubChem CID	61615
UNII	0B5M38T47H
CompTox Dashboard (EPA)	DTXSID20893875
- InChI: InChI=1S/3Co.2H3O4P/c;;;2*1-5(2,3)4/h;;;2*(H3,1,2,3,4)/q3*+2;;/p-6 Key: ZBDSFTZNNQNSQM-UHFFFAOYSA-H; InChI=1/3Co.2H3O4P/c;;;2*1-5(2,3)4/h;;;2*(H3,1,2,3,4)/q3*+2;;/p-6 Key: ZBDSFTZNNQNSQM-CYFPFDDLAU
- SMILES: [O-]P(=O)([O-])[O-].[O-]P(=O)([O-])[O-].[Co+2].[Co+2].[Co+2]

Properties
Chemical formula	Co_{3}(PO_{4})_{2}
Molar mass	366.74231 g/mol
Appearance	violet solid
Density	3.81 g/cm^{3}
Melting point	1,160 °C (2,120 °F; 1,430 K)
Solubility in water	insoluble
Solubility product (K_{sp})	2.05×10^{−35}
Magnetic susceptibility (χ)	28,110.0·10^{−6} cm^{3}/mol
Refractive index (n_{D})	1.7

Hazards
- GHS labelling
Pictograms	(GHS07: Exclamation mark)
Signal word	Warning
Hazard statements	H302, H315, H317, H319, H335
Precautionary statements	P261, P264, P264+P265, P270, P271, P272, P280, P301+P317, P302+P352, P304+P340, P305+P351+P338, P319, P321, P330, P333+P317, P337+P317, P362+P364, P403+P233, P405, P501
- Except where otherwise noted, data are given for materials in their standard state (at 25 °C [77 °F], 100 kPa). Infobox references

Cobalt phosphate is the inorganic compound with the formula Co_{3}(PO_{4})_{2}. It is a violet solid that is insoluble in water.

== Structure ==
According to X-ray crystallography, the anhydrous Co_{3}(PO_{4})_{2} consists of discrete phosphate (PO^{3−}_{4}) anions that link Co^{2+} centres. The cobalt ions occupy both octahedral (six-coordinate) and pentacoordinate sites in a 1:2 ratio.

== Preparation ==
The tetrahydrate Co_{3}(PO_{4})_{2}•4H_{2}O precipitates as a solid upon mixing aqueous solutions of cobalt(II) and phosphate salts. Upon heating, the tetrahydrate converts to the anhydrous material.

== Uses ==
Thin films of this material are water oxidation catalysts.

It is also a commercial inorganic pigment known as cobalt violet (PV14).

The color of Cobalt Phosphate differentiates depending on its hydration state. Three different compounds are usually reported including, violet anhydrous cobalt phosphate, a tetrahydrate described as violet-pink or deep violet, and the pink octahydrate.

A swatch of cobalt violet, popular among the French impressionists.

== See also ==
- List of inorganic pigments
