= Gallium(III) bromide =

Gallium(III) bromide (dimer)
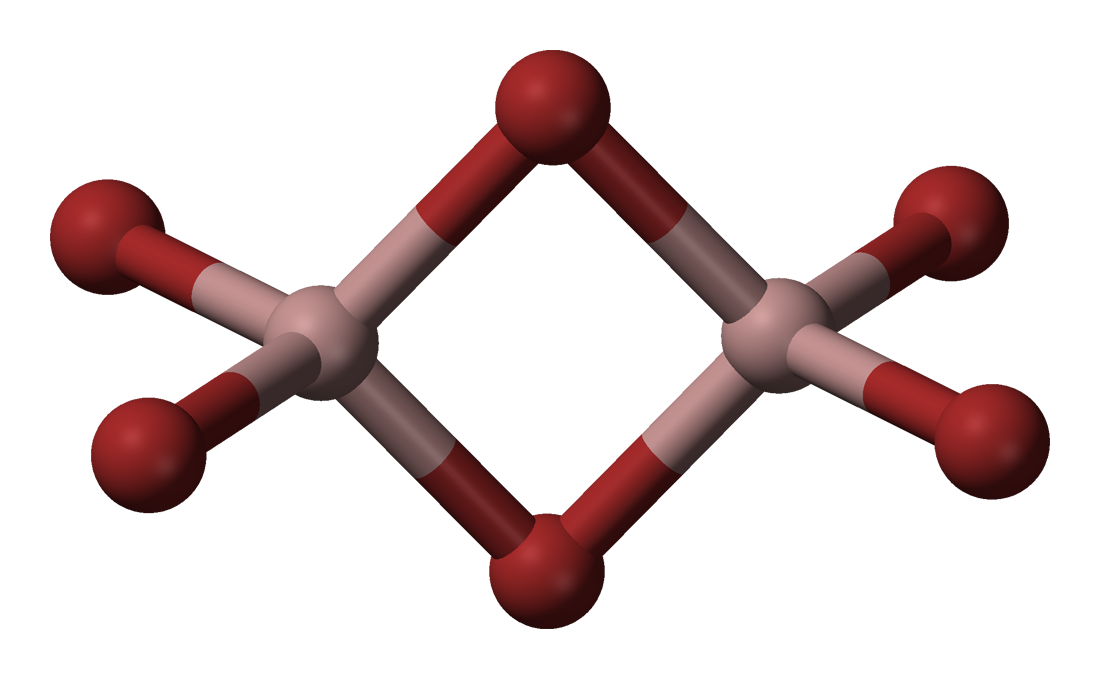
- Gallium(III) bromide (dimer)

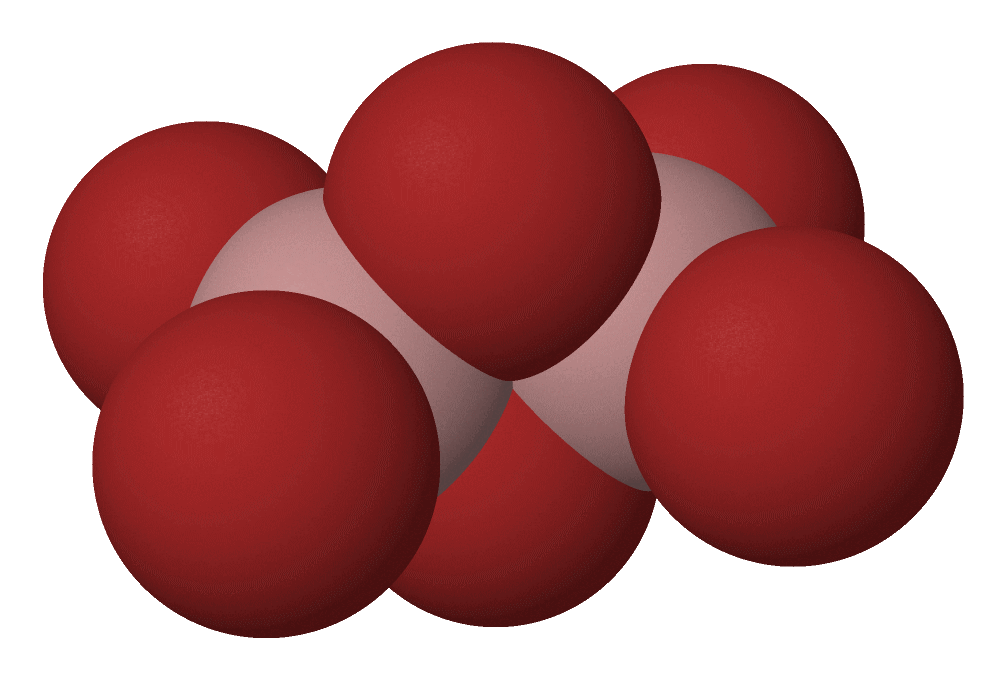

Names
- Other names gallium tribromide

Identifiers
| CAS Number | 13450-88-9 |
| 3D model (JSmol) | Interactive image |
| ChemSpider | 75315 |
| ECHA InfoCard | 100.033.267 |
| EC Number | 236-609-5 |
| PubChem CID | 83477 |
| CompTox Dashboard (EPA) | DTXSID2065466 |
- InChI: InChI=1S/3BrH.Ga/h3*1H;/q;;;+3/p-3 Key: SRVXDMYFQIODQI-UHFFFAOYSA-K; InChI=1/3BrH.Ga/h3*1H;/q;;;+3/p-3 Key: SRVXDMYFQIODQI-DFZHHIFOAJ
- SMILES: Br[Ga](Br)Br

Properties
| Chemical formula | GaBr_{3} |
| Molar mass | 309.435 g/mol |
| Appearance | white powder |
| Density | 3.69 g/cm^{3} |
| Melting point | 121.5 °C (250.7 °F; 394.6 K) |
| Boiling point | 278.8 °C (533.8 °F; 552.0 K) |
| Solubility in water | soluble |

Hazards
- GHS labelling
| Pictograms | (GHS05: Corrosive) |
| Signal word | Danger |
| Hazard statements | H314 |
| Precautionary statements | P260, P264, P280, P301+P330+P331, P303+P361+P353, P304+P340, P305+P351+P338, P310, P321, P363, P405, P501 |
| NFPA 704 (fire diamond) | 4 0 0 |
- Except where otherwise noted, data are given for materials in their standard state (at 25 °C [77 °F], 100 kPa). verify (what is ?) Infobox references

Gallium(III) bromide (GaBr_{3}) is a chemical compound and one of four gallium trihalides.

== Introduction ==
At room temperature and atmospheric pressure, Gallium(III) bromide is a white, crystalline powder that reacts favorably and exothermically with water. Solid gallium tribromide is stable at room temperature and can be found primarily in its dimeric form. GaBr_{3} can form an intermediate halide, Ga_{2}Br_{7;} however, this is not as common as with GaCl_{3}. It is a member of the gallium trihalide group and is similar to GaCl_{3}, and GaI_{3} (but not GaF_{3}) in its preparation and uses. GaBr_{3} is a milder Lewis acid than AlBr_{3} and has more versatile chemistry due to the comparative ease of reducing gallium, but it is more reactive than GaCl_{3}.

GaBr_{3} is similar spectroscopically to aluminum, indium, and thallium trihalides excluding trifluorides.

== Preparation ==
One method of preparing GaBr_{3} is to heat elemental gallium in the presence of bromine liquid under vacuum. Following the highly exothermic reaction, the mixture is allowed to rest and is then subjected to various purifying steps. This method from the turn of the twentieth century remains a useful way of preparing GaBr_{3.} Historically, gallium was obtained by electrolysis of its hydroxide in solution of potassium hydroxide. Today, it is obtained as a byproduct of aluminum and zinc production.

GaBr_{3} can be synthesized by exposing gallium to bromine in an environment free of water, oxygen and grease. The result is a gas which must be crystallized in order to form bromide purchased by laboratories. Below is the equation:

2 Ga(s) + 3 Br_{2}(l) → 2 GaBr_{3}(g)

== Structure ==
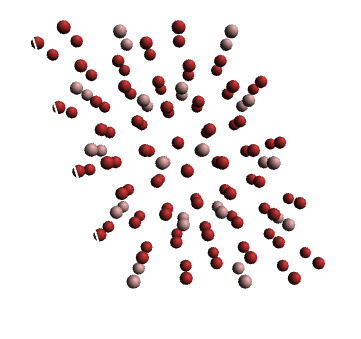
Extended crystal structure of GaBr_{3}

The GaBr_{3} monomer has trigonal planar geometry, but when it forms the dimer Ga_{2}Br_{6}, the geometry around the gallium center distorts to become roughly tetrahedral. As a solid, GaBr_{3} forms a monoclinic crystalline structure with a unit cell volume of 524.16 Å^{3}. Additional specifications for this unit cell are as follows: a = 8.87 Å, b = 5.64 Å, c =11.01 Å, α = 90˚, β = 107.81˚, γ = 90˚.

== Complexes ==
Gallium is the lightest group 13 metal with a filled d-shell, and has an electronic configuration of ([Ar] 3d^{10} 4s^{2} 4p^{1}) below the valence electrons that could take part in d-π bonding with ligands. The somewhat high oxidation state of Ga in Ga(III)Br_{3}, low electronegativity, and high polarizability allow GaBr_{3} to behave as a "soft acid" in terms of the Hard-Soft-Acid-Base (HSAB) theory. The Lewis acidity of all the gallium trihalides, GaBr_{3} included, has been extensively studied thermodynamically, and the basicity of GaBr_{3} has been established with a number of donors.

GaBr_{3} is capable of accepting an additional Br^{−} ion or unevenly splitting its dimer to form [GaBr_{4}]^{−}, a tetrahedral ion of which crystalline salts can be obtained. The Br^{−} ion can be just as easily substituted with a neutral ligand. Typically these neutral ligands, with form GaBr_{3} L and sometimes GaBr_{3}L_{2}, will form a tetrahedral bipyramidal geometric structure with the Br in an equatorial position due to their large effective nuclear charge. Additionally, GaBr_{3} can be used as a catalyst in certain oxidative addition reactions.

== Uses ==
GaBr_{3} is used as a catalyst in organic synthesis, with a similar mechanism to GaCl_{3.} However, due to its greater reactivity, it is sometimes disfavored because of the greater versatility of GaCl_{3}. GaBr_{3}, as well as other gallium trihalides and group 13 metal trihalides, can be used as catalysts in the oxidative addition of organic compounds. It has been verified that the GaBr_{3} dimer cleaves unevenly into [GaBr_{4}]^{−} and [GaBr_{2}]^{+}. The entire mechanism is uncertain partly because intermediate states are not always stable enough for study, and partially because GaBr_{3} is studied less frequently than GaCl_{3}. Ga(III) itself is a useful Lewis acid for organic reactions because its full d-electron shell makes it able to accept variable numbers of ligands, but it will readily give up ligands if conditions prove favorable.

== See also ==
- GaCl_{3}
- Catalysis
