= Optical material =

Optical materials are transparent materials from which optical lenses, prisms, windows, waveguides, and second-surface mirrors can be made. They are required in most optical instruments.

Most optical materials are rigid solids, but flexible and elastic materials are used for special functions. Contained liquids can also be used as optical materials.

Known optical materials include amorphous materials and crystalline materials:

- Glass
- Plastics
  - Polycarbonate
  - Poly(methyl methacrylate)
- Sodium chloride
- Strontium fluoride
- Synthetic diamond
- Zinc sulfide

Optical materials useful with infrared light include:

- Silicon (1.2–7 μm)
- Zinc selenide

Non-linear optical materials or nonlinear media transform light in various ways in nonlinear optics.

Non-linear optical materials include:

- Barium borate

Some materials (optical and non-optical) can be made into first-surface mirrors, by silvering them or plating them with metal. Some metals can be highly polished, providing both support and the reflective surface of first-surface mirrors.

== See also ==
- Optical coating
