= Gallium(III) fluoride =

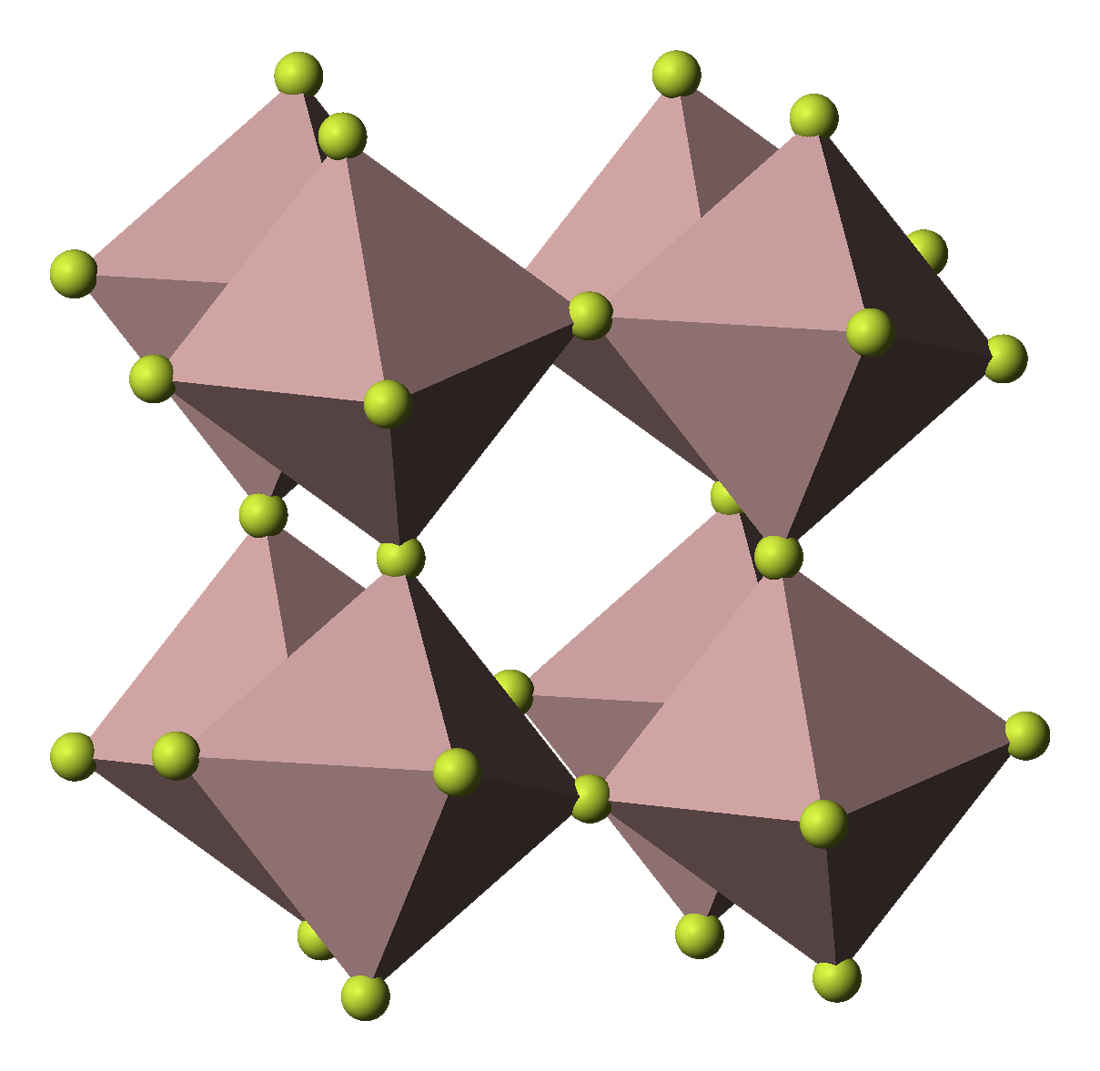
- Gallium(III) fluoride

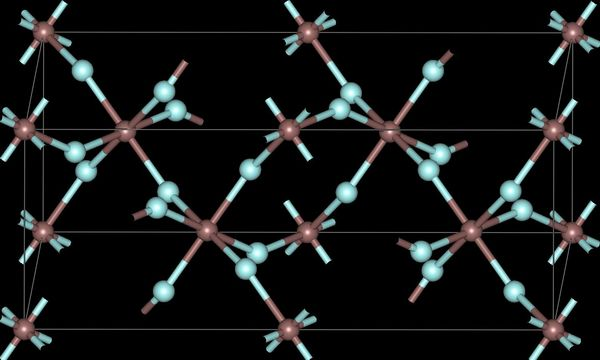

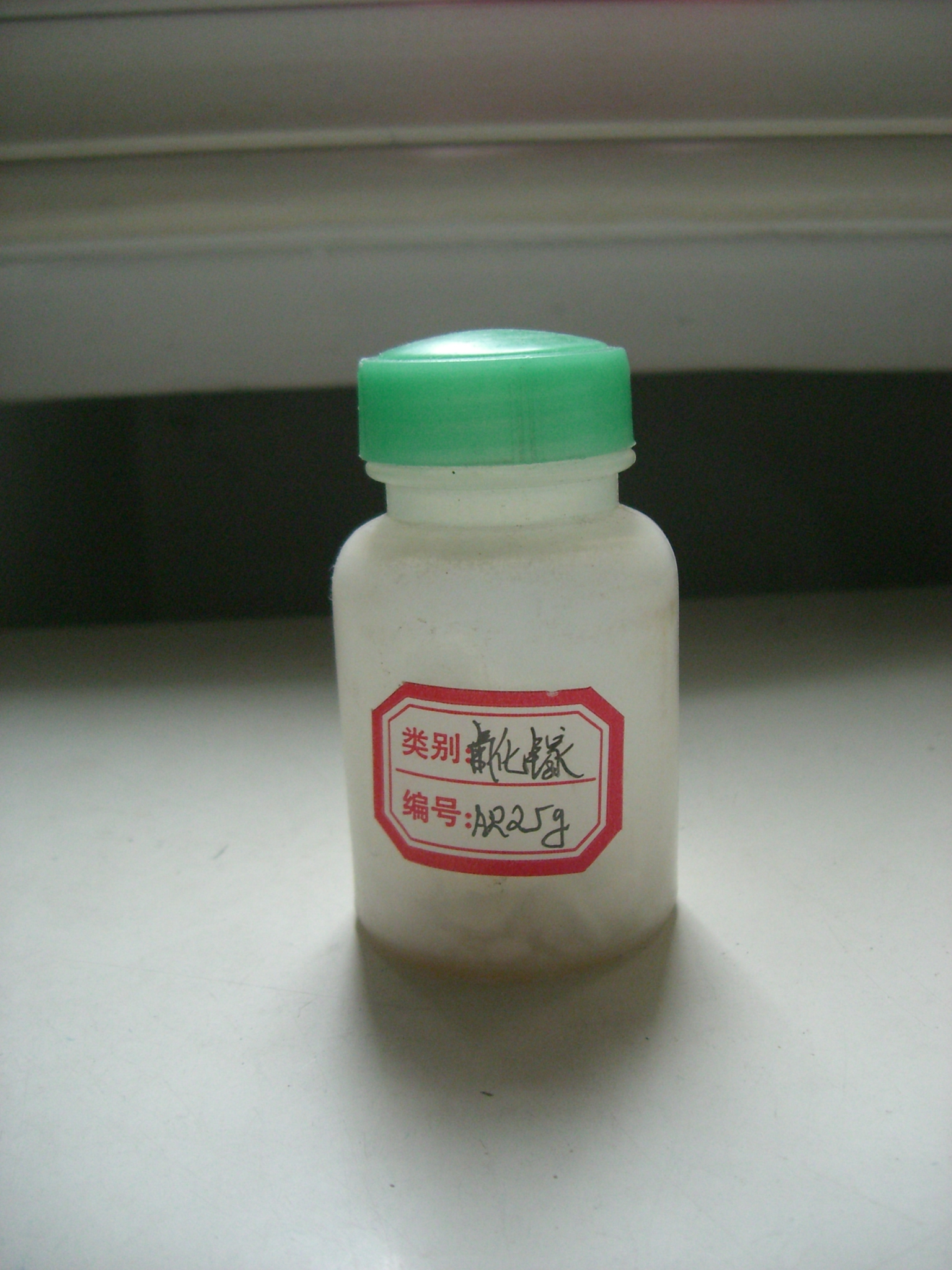

Names
- Other names gallium trifluoride

Identifiers
CAS Number	7783-51-9
3D model (JSmol)	Interactive image
ChemSpider	74191
ECHA InfoCard	100.029.094
EC Number	232-004-5
PubChem CID	82211
UNII	3EG50JLZ49
CompTox Dashboard (EPA)	DTXSID6064824
- InChI: InChI=1S/3FH.Ga/h3*1H;/q;;;+3/p-3 Key: WXXZSFJVAMRMPV-UHFFFAOYSA-K; InChI=1/3FH.Ga/h3*1H;/q;;;+3/p-3 Key: WXXZSFJVAMRMPV-DFZHHIFOAM
- SMILES: F[Ga](F)F

Properties
Chemical formula	GaF_{3}
Molar mass	126.718 g/mol
Appearance	white powder
Density	4.47 g/cm^{3}
Melting point	800 °C (1,470 °F; 1,070 K)
Boiling point	1,000 °C (1,830 °F; 1,270 K)
Solubility in water	0.0002 g/100 mL

Structure
Crystal structure	Rhombohedral, hR24
Space group	R-3c, No. 167

Hazards
- GHS labelling
Pictograms	(GHS07: Exclamation mark)
Signal word	Warning
Hazard statements	H302, H312, H332
Precautionary statements	P261, P264, P270, P271, P280, P301+P312, P302+P352, P304+P312, P304+P340, P312, P322, P330, P363, P501
NFPA 704 (fire diamond)	3 0 0
- Except where otherwise noted, data are given for materials in their standard state (at 25 °C [77 °F], 100 kPa). verify (what is ?) Infobox references

Gallium(III) fluoride (GaF_{3}) is a chemical compound. It is a white solid that melts under pressure above 1000 °C but sublimes around 950 °C. It has the FeF_{3} structure where the gallium atoms are 6-coordinate. GaF_{3} can be prepared by reacting F_{2} or HF with Ga_{2}O_{3} or by thermal decomposition of (NH_{4})_{3}GaF_{6}. GaF_{3} is virtually insoluble in water. Solutions of GaF_{3} in HF can be evaporated to form the trihydrate, GaF_{3}·3H_{2}O, which on heating gives a hydrated form of GaF_{2}(OH). Gallium(III) fluoride reacts with mineral acids to form hydrofluoric acid.

view along the a axis	view along the c axis	Ga coordination	F coordination
