= Gallium(III) iodide =

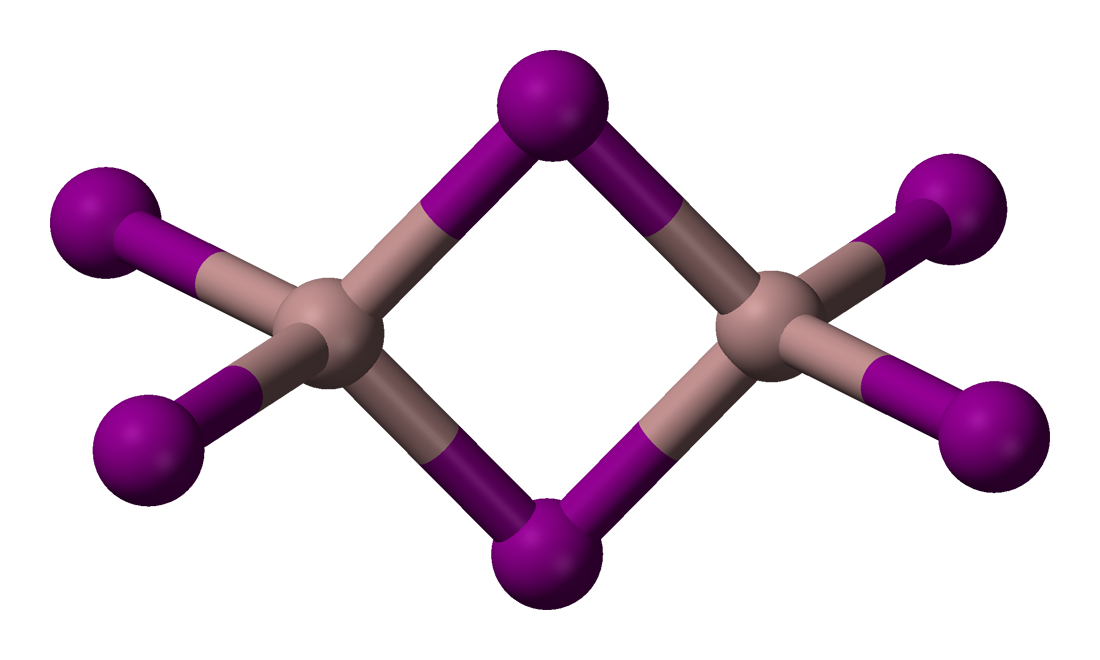
- Gallium(III) iodide

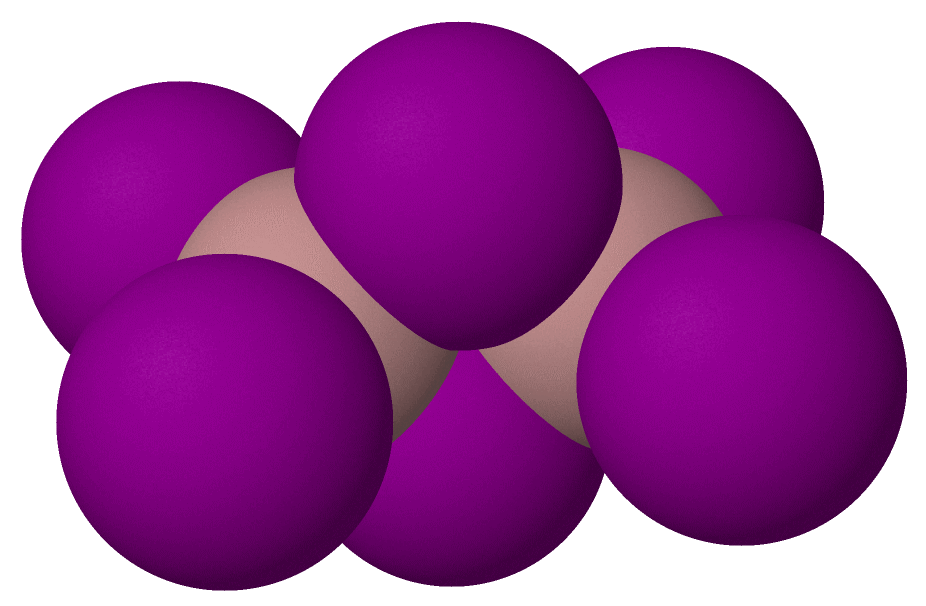

Names
- Other names gallium triiodide

Identifiers
CAS Number	13450-91-4
3D model (JSmol)	Interactive image
ChemSpider	75316
ECHA InfoCard	100.033.269
EC Number	236-611-6
PubChem CID	83478
CompTox Dashboard (EPA)	DTXSID7065467
- InChI: InChI=1S/Ga.3HI/h;3*1H/q+3;;;/p-3 Key: DWRNSCDYNYYYHT-UHFFFAOYSA-K; InChI=1/Ga.3HI/h;3*1H/q+3;;;/p-3 Key: DWRNSCDYNYYYHT-DFZHHIFOAW
- SMILES: I[Ga](I)I

Properties
Chemical formula	GaI_{3}
Molar mass	450.436 g/mol
Appearance	light yellow powder
Density	4.5 g/cm^{3}
Melting point	212 °C (414 °F; 485 K)
Boiling point	340 °C (644 °F; 613 K)
Solubility in water	decomposes
Magnetic susceptibility (χ)	−149.0·10^{−6} cm^{3}/mol

Thermochemistry
Heat capacity (C)	100 J/(mol·K)
Std molar entropy (S^{⦵}_{298})	205.0 J/(mol·K)
Std enthalpy of formation (Δ_{f}H^{⦵}_{298})	−238.9 kJ/mol

Hazards
- GHS labelling
Pictograms	(GHS05: Corrosive) (GHS07: Exclamation mark) (GHS08: Health hazard)
Signal word	Danger
Hazard statements	H314, H317, H334, H335, H361
Precautionary statements	P280, P305+P351+P338, P310
NFPA 704 (fire diamond)	4 0 1
- Except where otherwise noted, data are given for materials in their standard state (at 25 °C [77 °F], 100 kPa). verify (what is ?) Infobox references

Gallium(III) iodide is the inorganic compound with the formula GaI_{3}. A yellow hygroscopic solid, it is the most common iodide of gallium. In the chemical vapor transport method of growing crystals of gallium arsenide uses iodine as the transport agent. In the solid state, it exists as the dimer Ga_{2}I_{6}, with a diborane structure. When vaporized, its forms GaI_{3} molecules of D_{3h} symmetry where the Ga–I distance is 2.458 Angstroms.

Gallium triiodide can be reduced with gallium metal to give a green-colored gallium(I) iodide. The nature of this species is unclear, but it is useful for the preparation of gallium(I) and gallium(II) compounds.

Gallium triiodide is a lewis acid, readily reacting with iodides to form the [GaI₄]⁻ anion.

Gallium triiodide needs to be prepared under anhydrous conditions because it reacts with water to form gallium hydroxide and hydrogen iodide:

GaI₃ + 3H₂O → Ga(OH)₃ + 3HI

== See also ==
- Gallium halides

== Cited sources ==
- Haynes, William M., ed. (2016). CRC Handbook of Chemistry and Physics (97th ed.). CRC Press. ISBN 9781498754293.
