= Erbium perchlorate =

Names
- Other names Erbium(III) perchlorate

Identifiers
CAS Number	14017-55-1; 14692-15-0 hexahydrate; 19414-31-4 nonahydrate

Properties
Chemical formula	Er(ClO_{4})_{3}
Molar mass	463.61 g/mol
Appearance	Pink crystalline solid (hydrates)
Density	2.26 g/cm^{3} (hexahydrate)
Solubility in water	Soluble in water

Structure
Crystal structure	Hexagonal (anhydrous)
Space group	P6_{3}/m, No. 176
Formula units (Z)	2
- Except where otherwise noted, data are given for materials in their standard state (at 25 °C [77 °F], 100 kPa). Infobox references

Erbium perchlorate is an inorganic compound of erbium and the perchlorate ion, with the chemical formula Er(ClO_{4})_{3}. It is known in anhydrous form and as several hydrates, including the hexa- and nonahydrates. Anhydrous erbium perchlorate adopts the hexagonal structure characteristic of many rare-earth perchlorates.

== Preparation ==
Hydrated erbium perchlorate can be prepared by dissolving erbium(III) oxide in concentrated perchloric acid:

Er_{2}O_{3} + 6 HClO_{4} → 2 Er(ClO_{4})_{3} + 3 H_{2}O

Crystallization of the resulting solution gives hydrated erbium perchlorates.

Anhydrous Er(ClO_{4})_{3} can be obtained by dehydrating hydrated material with chlorine oxide dehydrating agents under reduced pressure.

== Properties ==
=== Anhydrous structure ===
Anhydrous Er(ClO_{4})_{3} crystallizes in the hexagonal crystal system, space group P6_{3}/m (No. 176), with two formula units per unit cell.

It belongs to the isostructural series of anhydrous lanthanide perchlorates extending from lanthanum through erbium and the low-temperature form of thulium.

The Er^{3+} ion is nine-coordinate. Its coordination sphere is formed by oxygen atoms from perchlorate groups, which act as tridentate ligands and link the erbium centres into a three-dimensional framework containing channels.

The lattice dimensions decrease systematically across the lanthanide series as a result of the lanthanide contraction.

=== Hydrates ===
Several hydrated forms of erbium perchlorate are known. The hexahydrate, Er(ClO_{4})_{3}·6H_{2}O, forms pink crystals, while a nonahydrate has also been reported.

The hexahydrate is isostructural with the corresponding perchlorate hexahydrates of La(III), Tb(III), and Tl(III).

In these hexahydrates, the metal ion is surrounded by six water molecules in an approximately octahedral [M(H_{2}O)_{6}]^{3+} environment, while perchlorate ions occupy the outer coordination sphere.

=== Aqueous solution ===
In dilute aqueous erbium perchlorate, Er^{3+} occurs predominantly as the octaaqua ion [Er(H_{2}O)_{8}]^{3+}.

Raman spectroscopy assigns a strongly polarized band at approximately 389 cm^{−1} to the symmetric Er–O breathing mode of [Er(H_{2}O)_{8}]^{3+}.

Perchlorate behaves mainly as a weakly coordinating counterion in dilute solution. At higher concentrations, ion pairing between Er^{3+} and ClO_{4}^{−} becomes more significant.

== Coordination chemistry ==
Erbium perchlorate is used as a soluble source of Er^{3+} in coordination chemistry. For example, solvothermal reaction with 2,2′-bipyridine-4,4′-dicarboxylic acid in aqueous dimethylformamide has been used to prepare the porous metal–organic framework [ErL_{3/2}(DMF)(H_{2}O)_{2}]·2H_{2}O.

== Safety ==
Erbium perchlorate is an oxidizing perchlorate salt and should be kept away from combustible and strongly reducing materials.
