= Thallium(III) perchlorate =

Names
- Other names Thallic perchlorate

Identifiers
CAS Number	15596-83-5; 79060-90-5 hexahydrate
3D model (JSmol)	Interactive image; Interactive image
ChemSpider	9126446; 2341334
PubChem CID	16685256
CompTox Dashboard (EPA)	DTXSID70166001
- InChI: InChI=1S/3ClHO4.Tl/c3*2-1(3,4)5;/h3*(H,2,3,4,5);/q;;;+3/p-3 Key: ICUPVABCPRSYKW-UHFFFAOYSA-K; InChI=1S/3ClHO4.6H2O.Tl/c3*2-1(3,4)5;;;;;;;/h3*(H,2,3,4,5);6*1H2;/q;;;;;;;;;+3/p-3 Key: OSXCISGVIPGBLK-UHFFFAOYSA-K
- SMILES: O=Cl(=O)(=O)O[Tl](OCl(=O)(=O)=O)OCl(=O)(=O)=O; O.O.O.O.O.O.O=Cl(=O)(=O)O[Tl](OCl(=O)(=O)=O)OCl(=O)(=O)=O

Properties
Chemical formula	Tl(ClO_{4})_{3}
Molar mass	502.73 g/mol
Appearance	Crystalline solid
Solubility in water	Hydrolyzes in water; soluble in acidic solution
- Except where otherwise noted, data are given for materials in their standard state (at 25 °C [77 °F], 100 kPa). Infobox references

Thallium(III) perchlorate is an inorganic compound of thallium in the +3 oxidation state and the perchlorate ion, with the formula Tl(ClO_{4})_{3}. It is known in anhydrous form and as the hexahydrate Tl(ClO_{4})_{3}·6H_{2}O. In acidic aqueous solution, Tl^{3+} occurs predominantly as the hexaaqua ion [Tl(H_{2}O)_{6}]^{3+}.

== Preparation ==
Thallium(III) perchlorate can be prepared by metathesis of thallium(III) chloride with silver perchlorate:

TlCl_{3} + 3 AgClO_{4} → Tl(ClO_{4})_{3} + 3 AgCl↓

This preparation was reported in early studies of thallium(III) salts of halogen oxyacids.

Hydrated thallium(III) perchlorate can also be obtained by reaction of thallium(III) hydroxide with perchloric acid, followed by crystallization from acidic aqueous solution.

Anhydrous Tl(ClO_{4})_{3} can be prepared from thallium(III) chloride and dichlorine hexoxide. The initial product is the chloryl salt ClO_{2}Tl(ClO_{4})_{4}, which decomposes at about 80 °C under dynamic vacuum to give anhydrous Tl(ClO_{4})_{3}.

== Properties ==
=== Anhydrous structure ===
Anhydrous Tl(ClO_{4})_{3} is a polymeric perchlorate solid rather than a lattice of discrete Tl^{3+} and non-coordinating perchlorate ions. Infrared and Raman spectra are consistent with a structure related to the AsI_{3} type, in which perchlorate groups bridge neighboring Tl(III) centres as bidentate ligands. The strong metal–perchlorate interaction contrasts with the much weaker coordination of perchlorate to hydrated Tl^{3+} in aqueous solution.

=== Hexahydrate ===
The hexahydrate, Tl(ClO_{4})_{3}·6H_{2}O, is isostructural with the corresponding hexahydrates of La(III), Tb(III) and Er(III). It crystallizes in the cubic space group Fm3̅m, with four formula units per unit cell. The Tl^{3+} ion is surrounded by six water molecules in a nearly regular octahedral [Tl(H_{2}O)_{6}]^{3+} coordination environment. The Tl–O distance is approximately 2.23 Å.

=== Aqueous solution and hydrolysis ===
In strongly acidic aqueous solution, the hydrated thallium(III) ion retains essentially the same octahedral [Tl(H_{2}O)_{6}]^{3+} structure found in the crystalline hexahydrate. The Tl–O distance in acidic solution is about 2.235 Å. The hydrated ion is strongly acidic and hydrolyzes substantially when the acidity is lowered. Perchlorate is useful in studies of Tl(III) solution chemistry because it coordinates much more weakly than halide ions.

=== Thermal decomposition ===
Anhydrous thallium(III) perchlorate is thermally much less stable than indium(III) perchlorate. It begins to decompose at about 95 °C. The first identified solid product has composition approximately TlO_{0.5}(ClO_{4})_{2}. Thus the 95 °C value sometimes listed as a "melting point" is better described as the onset of decomposition.

=== Redox chemistry ===
Thallium(III) is a strong oxidizing agent in acidic perchlorate solution. For example, Tl(III) oxidizes tris(1,10-phenanthroline)ruthenium(II) to the corresponding ruthenium(III) complex:

[Ru(phen)_{3}]^{2+} + Tl^{3+} → [Ru(phen)_{3}]^{3+} + Tl^{+}

Thallium(III) perchlorate has consequently been used as a convenient source of Tl^{3+} in oxidation and coordination-chemistry studies.

== Safety ==
Thallium(III) perchlorate combines the high toxicity of soluble thallium compounds with the oxidizing properties of perchlorate salts. It should be handled with appropriate precautions and kept away from combustible or strongly reducing materials.
