= Thallium nitrate =

Thallium nitrate may refer to:

- Thallium(I) nitrate
- Thallium(III) nitrate
