= Lorándite =

Thallium arsenic sulfosalt

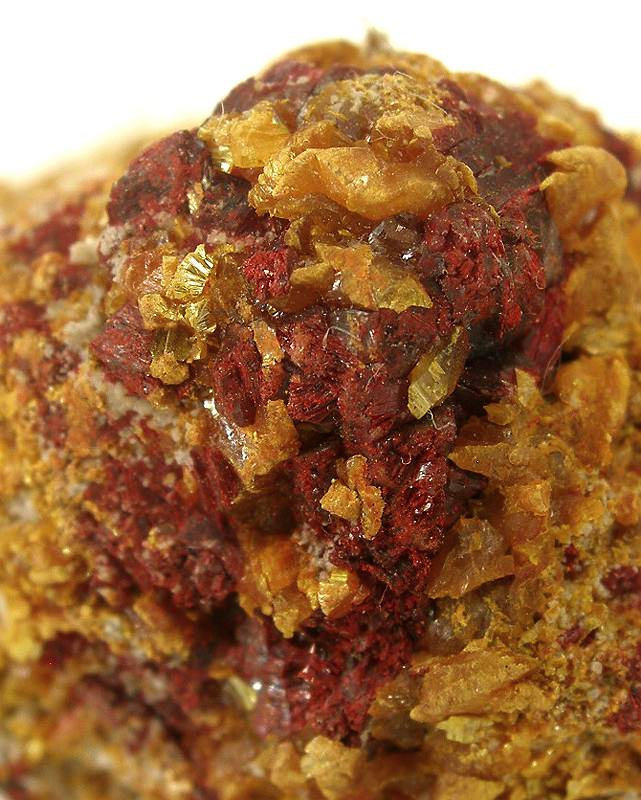

General
- Category: Sulfosalt mineral
- Formula: TlAsS_{2}
- IMA symbol: Lor
- Strunz classification: 2.HD.05
- Crystal system: Monoclinic
- Crystal class: Prismatic (2/m) (same H-M symbol)
- Space group: P2_{1}/a

Identification
- Color: Red to carmine-red, lead gray
- Crystal habit: Prismatic tabular striated parallel to [001]
- Cleavage: [100] perfect, [001] distinct
- Fracture: Conchoidal
- Mohs scale hardness: 2.0–2.5
- Luster: Sub-metallic – adamantine
- Streak: Cherry-red
- Diaphaneity: Subtransparent
- Specific gravity: 5.53
- Optical properties: Biaxial (+)
- Refractive index: n_{α} = 2.720
- Pleochroism: Weak; Y = purple-red; Z = orange-red
- Other characteristics: Tenacity: flexible, forming cleavage lamellae and fibers

Lorándite is a thallium arsenic sulfosalt with the chemical formula: TlAsS_{2}. Though rare, it is the most common thallium-bearing mineral. Lorándite occurs in low-temperature hydrothermal associations and in gold and mercury ore deposits. Associated minerals include stibnite, realgar, orpiment, cinnabar, vrbaite, greigite, marcasite, pyrite, tetrahedrite, antimonian sphalerite, arsenic and barite.

The mineral is being used for the detection of solar neutrinos via a certain nuclear reaction involving thallium. It has a monoclinic crystal structure consisting of spiral chains of AsS_{3} tetrahedra interconnected by thallium atoms, and can be synthesized in the laboratory.

== History ==
Lorándite was first discovered at the Allchar deposit, near Kavadarci (now North Macedonia) in 1894 and named after Loránd Eötvös, a prominent Hungarian physicist.

== Distribution ==
Apart from the Allchar deposit in North Macedonia, lorándite is also found at the Dzhizhikrut Sb–Hg deposit in Tajikistan and at the Beshtau uranium deposit, near Pyatigorsk, northern Caucasus Mountains, Russia. As an ore mineral, it is encountered at the Lanmuchang Hg–Tl deposit, Guizhou Province, China; at the Zarshuran gold deposit in northeastern Iran; and at the Lengenbach Quarry in Switzerland. In the US, it is present at the New Rambler Cu–Ni mine in Wyoming; at the Jerritt Canyon mines, Independence Mountains district and Carlin Gold mine in Nevada; and at the Mercur gold deposit in Utah.

== Laboratory synthesis ==
Single crystals of lorándite can be grown from a mixture of thallium(I) nitrate (TlNO_{3}), elemental arsenic and sulfur in concentrated aqueous solution of ammonia. The mixture is placed in an autoclave and is kept at elevated temperature (~250 °C) for several days. This procedure yields deep-red prismatic crystals elongated along the [001] crystal axis, which are similar to the mineral in appearance and crystallographic structure details.

== Structure ==
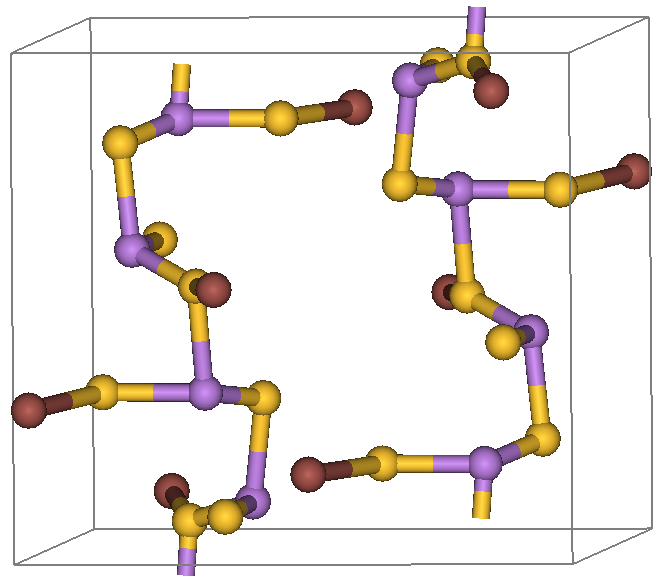
Crystal structure of lorándite. Violet atoms are arsenic, yellow are sulfur and brown are thallium.

The crystal structure of lorándite is monoclinic, space group P2_{1}/a, Z = 4, with the lattice constants a = 1.228 nm, b = 1.130 nm, c = 0.6101 nm and β = 104.5 °. It consists of spiral chains of AsS_{3} tetrahedra oriented to the [010] crystal axis. The chains are covalently interlinked by irregularly coordinated Tl atoms (chain interconnections not shown in the picture), and breaking of these links is responsible for crystal cleavage.

== Occurrence ==
The tectonic setting of the Allchar deposit, North Macedonia where lorándite was originally discovered, is an anticline structure originating from sediments of the upper Cretaceous Period. During the mineralization processes, the presence of andesite rocks caused movements of hydrothermal solutions along the dolomite and andesite contacts enabling the formation of lorándite deposits.

== Applications ==
In 1976, it was proposed to use a thallium-rich mineral, lorándite, for the detection of solar neutrinos. The method relies on the ^{205}Tl(ν_{e},e^{−})^{205}Pb reaction, which has a relatively low threshold energy of 52 keV and thus relatively high efficiency. This reaction yields ^{205}Pb isotope which has a long lifetime of 15.4 million years; it is induced not only by neutrinos, but also by other cosmic particles. They all have different penetration depths in the Earth's crust, and thus analysis of the ^{205}Pb content in a thallium-containing ore taken from different depths brings information on the neutrinos of the past millennia. Thus, the LORándite EXperiment (LOREX), was running between 2008 and 2010 and is based in one of the largest source of lorándite, the Allchar deposit in southern North Macedonia.

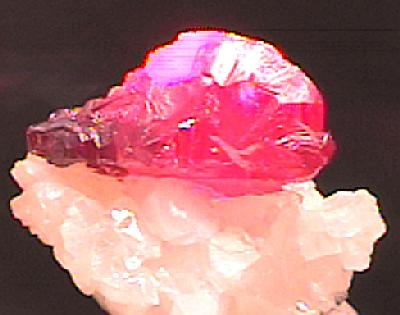
Lorándite crystal on calcite matrix, Mercur Mine, Mercur, Utah, US. Size 1.8 × 1.8 × 0.4 cm.

== See also ==
- Hutchinsonite
