= Thallium halides =

Class of elements

The thallium halides include monohalides TlX, where thallium has oxidation state +1, trihalides TlX_{3}, where thallium generally has oxidation state +3, and some intermediate halides containing thallium with mixed +1 and +3 oxidation states. X is a halogen. These salts find use in specialized optical settings, such as focusing elements in research spectrophotometers. Compared to the more common zinc selenide-based optics, materials such as thallium bromoiodide enable transmission at longer wavelengths. In the infrared, this allows for measurements as low as 350 cm^{−1} (28 μm), whereas zinc selenide is opaque by 21.5 μm, and zinc sulfide optics are generally only usable to 650 cm^{−1} (15 μm).

== Monohalides ==
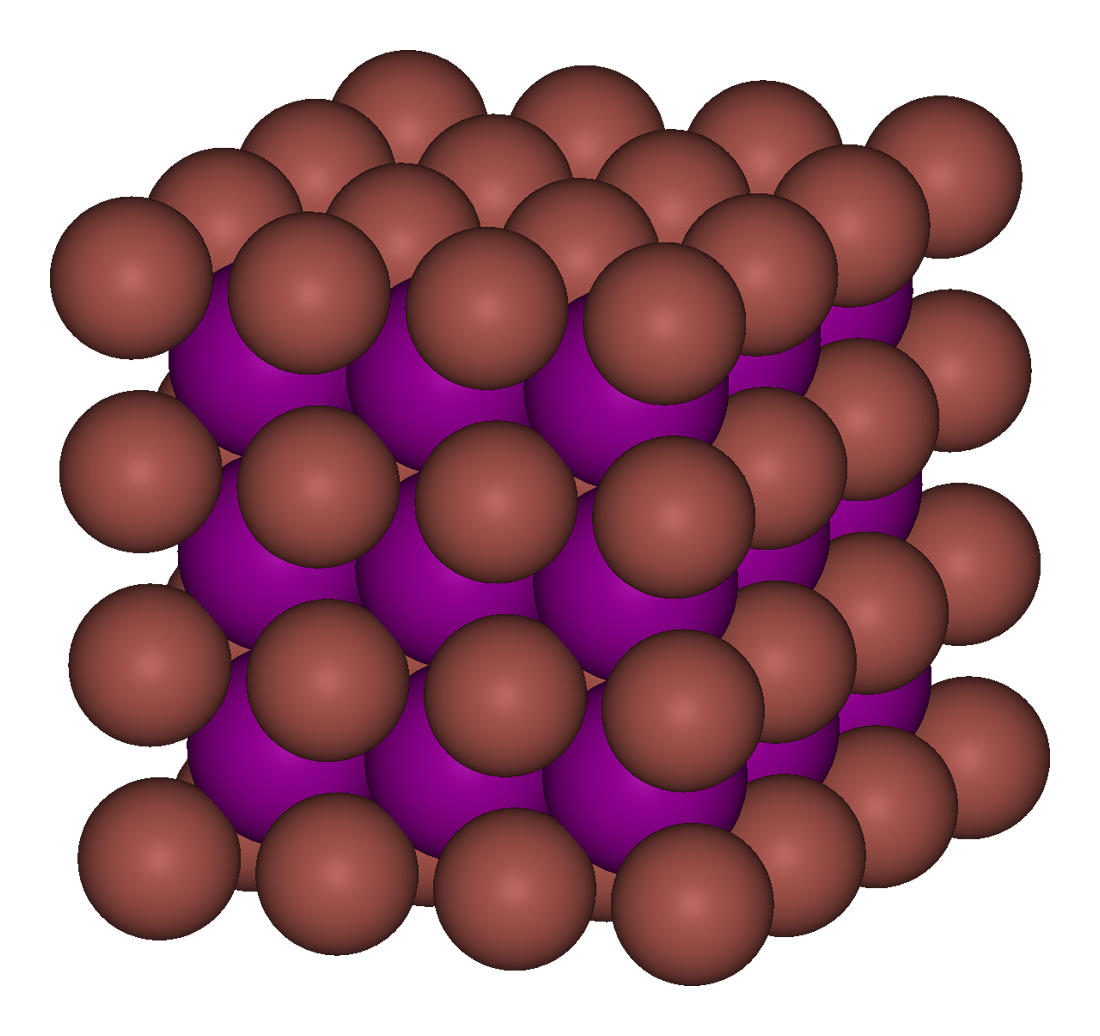
Hot thallium(I) iodide has the CsCl crystal structure.

The monohalides, also known as thallous halides, all contain thallium with oxidation state +1. Parallels can be drawn between the thallium(I) halides and their corresponding silver salts; for example, thallium(I) chloride and bromide are light-sensitive, and thallium(I) fluoride is more soluble in water than the chloride and bromide. Unlike the silver salts, however, thallous halide complex salts are very weakly bonded in solution, and practically nonexistent in the solid state. The dissolved complexes are generally of the form (TlX_{3})^{2−} and (TlX_{4})^{3−}.

The solid-state forms of thallous chloride (TlCl) and bromide (TlBr) are isostructural with caesium chloride, but the fluoride (TlF) and iodide (TlI) adopt distorted structures. The room temperature structures of Tl-F and Tl-I have been explained through an interaction between Tl 6s and the halide p states; orbital mixing produces producing strongly antibonding Tl-X states. The structure distorts to minimise these unfavourable covalent interactions.

Structurally, TlF resembles α-PbO, distorted rock-salt with essentially five-coordinate thallium and a distant sixth fluoride. At 62 °C it transforms to a tetragonal structure, unchanged up to 40 GPa pressure. At room temperature, TlI also adopts an eponymous distorted rock salt structure, the β-TlI structure, with five-coordinate thallium but two distant iodides. At 170 °C or 5 kbar, it transforms to the CsCl structure.

As the anions become less electronegative, the bonding in thallium halides becomes less ionic, and the substances begin to show color. TlF and TlCl are white, TlBr is pale yellow, and TlI is bright yellow. The high-temperature or -pressure modification of TlI is red, darkening as further pressure is applied, until around 160 kbar TlI becomes a metal.

The melting point of thallium halides also increases with anion mass. Little is known about the molten state. Gaseous thallous fluoride is a dimer, (TlF)_{2}, but its structure is unclear and may include a thallium-thallium bond.

== Thallium(I) mixed halides ==
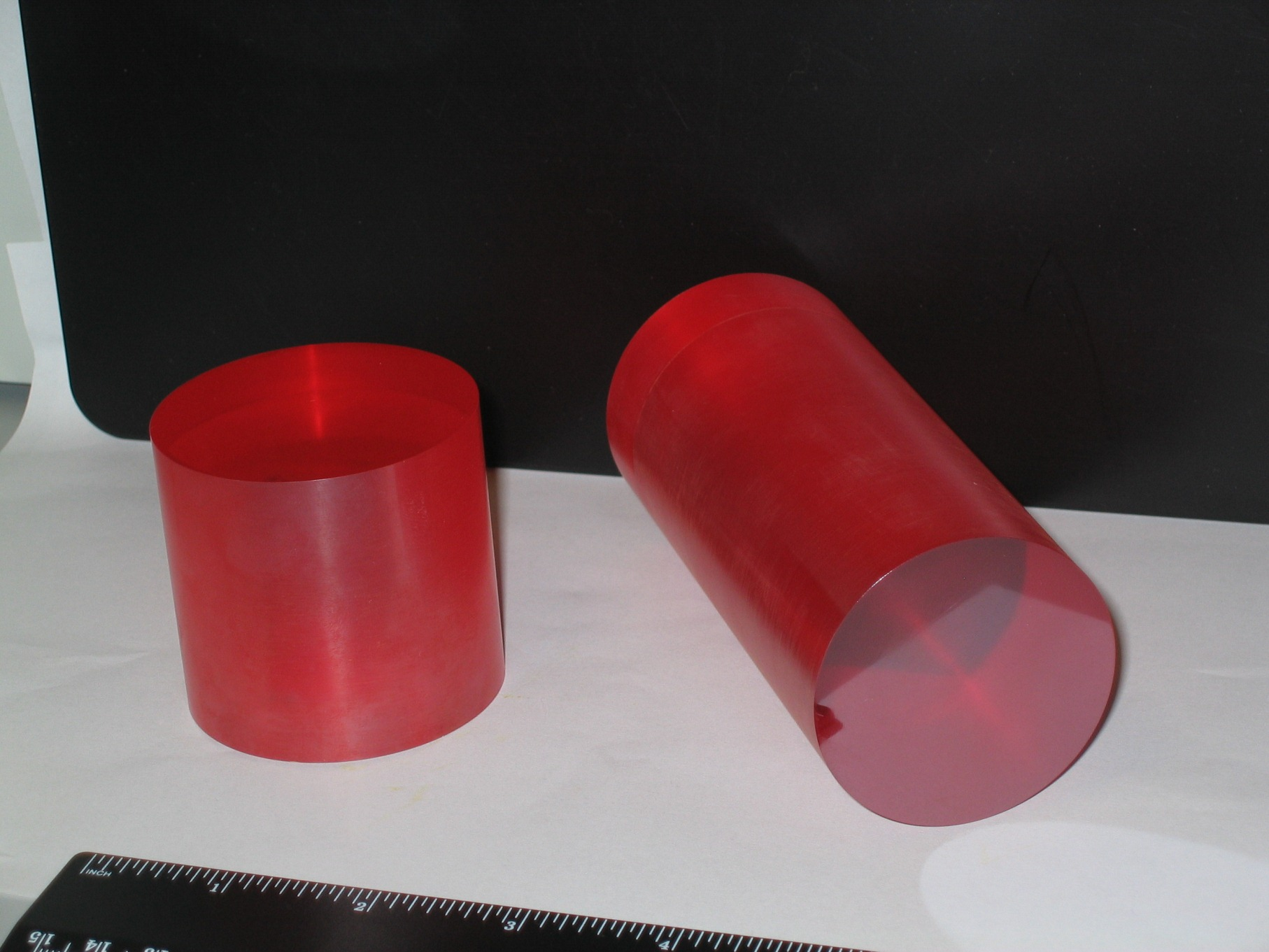
Thallium bromide iodide ingots

Thallium bromoiodide or thallium bromide iodide (TlBr_{x}I_{1−x}) and thallium bromochloride or thallium bromide chloride (TlBr_{x}Cl_{1−x}) are mixed salts of thallium(I) that are used in spectroscopy as an optical material for transmission, refraction, and focusing of infrared radiation. The materials were first grown by R. Koops in the laboratory of Olexander Smakula at the Carl Zeiss Optical Works, Jena in 1941. The red bromoiodide was coded KRS-5 and the colourless bromochloride, KRS-6 and this is how they are commonly known. The KRS prefix is an abbreviation of "Kristalle aus dem Schmelz-fluss", (crystals from the melt). The compositions of KRS-5 and KRS-6 approximate to TlBr_{0.4}I_{0.6} and TlBr_{0.3}Cl_{0.7}. KRS-5 is the most commonly used, its properties of being relatively insoluble in water and non-hygroscopic, make it an alternative to KBr, CsI, and AgCl.

== Trihalides ==
The thallium trihalides, also known as thallic halides, are less stable than their corresponding aluminium, gallium, and indium counterparts and chemically quite distinct. The triiodide does not contain thallium with oxidation state +3 but is a thallium(I) compound and contains the linear I^{−}_{3} ion.

The thallium(III) salts are all highly moisture-sensitive. All can be synthesized through action of the halogen in an appropriate solvent on the corresponding thallium(I) salt; analogous mixed halide salts (e.g. TlFBr_{2}) are also possible. Thallic fluoride (TlF_{3}) can also be made by fluoridation of Tl_{2}O_{3} with F_{2}, BrF_{3}, or SF_{4} at 300 °C.

Thallic chloride (TlCl_{3}) forms a number of hydrates. Thallic bromide (TlBr_{3}) is only known to form a tetrahydrate. Both can only be dehydrated through chemical means: heating the hydrates to 40 °C causes decomposition to the corresponding thallous salt.

Physical properties are as follows:

Thallium(III) fluoride
TlF_{3} is a white solid, mp 550 °C. Its structure is the same as YF_{3} and β-BiF_{3}. Thallium atom is 9 coordinate (tricapped trigonal prismatic), but one distant fluoride is only dubiously coordinated.
Thallium(III) chloride
TlCl_{3} has a monoclinic yttrium chloride structure like AlCl_{3} and InCl_{3}. It melts at 155 °C.
Thallium(III) bromide
Thallium(I) triiodide
TlI_{3} is a black crystalline solid prepared from TlI and I_{2} in aqueous HI. It does not contain thallium(III), but has the same structure as CsI_{3} containing the linear I^{−}_{3} ion.

The compounds are relatively oxidizing, and halogenate pnictogen(III) compounds.

== Halide complexes and mixed valence ==
Although thallous halides resist complex formation (see § Monohalides), the trihalides are relatively Lewis acidic in the solid state. (The compounds are rather basic as aqueous species. TlF_{3} generally does not form complexes, and dichloro- and dibromothallium(III) complexes of the form [TlX_{2}]^{+} are "amongst the most stable of metal halide complexes in aqueous solution". Nevertheless, thallic chloride and bromide both form complexes with ammonia.) The mixed-valence salts are not well characterised, but are generally the Tl(I) salt of an anionic Tl(III) complex, e.g. TlCl^{−}_{4}.

Thallium(III) fluoride complexes
The salts NaTlF_{4} and NaTlF_{4} do not contain discrete tetrahedral anions. They both adopt the fluorite (CaF_{2}) structure. ContrariwiseK_{3}TlF_{6} and K_{3}TlF_{6} both have distinct, octahedral [TlF_{6}]^{3−} anions. Both compounds are usually considered to be mixed salts of Na^{+} and Tl^{3+}.

Thallium(III) chloride complexes
Salts of tetrahedral TlCl^{−}_{4} and octahedral TlCl^{3−}_{6} are known with various cations.

Salts containing TlCl^{2−}_{5} with a square pyramidal structure are known. Some salts that nominally contain TlCl^{2−}_{5} actually contain the dimeric anion Tl_{2}Cl^{4−}_{10}, long chain anions where Tl^{III} is 6 coordinate and the octahedral units are linked by bridging chlorine atoms, or mixed salts of Tl^{III}Cl_{4} and Tl^{III}Cl_{6}.

The ion Tl_{2}Cl^{3−}_{9}, where thallium atoms are octahedrally coordinated with three bridging chlorine atoms, has been identified in the caesium salt, Cs_{3}Tl_{2}Cl_{9}.

Thallium(III) bromide complexes
Salts of Tl^{III}Br^{−}_{4} and Tl^{III}Br^{3−}_{6} are known with various cations.

The TlBr^{2−}_{5} anion has been characterised in a number of salts and is trigonal bipyramidal. Some other salts that nominally contain TlBr^{2−}_{5} are mixed salts containing TlBr^{−}_{4} and Br^{−}.

Thallium(III) iodide complexes
Salts of Tl^{III}I^{−}_{4} are known. The anion is stable even though neutral TlI_{3} is a thallium(I) compound.

Additionally, mixed halide complexes are known to precipitate from acetonitrile solutions with relatively bulky cations (e.g., tetraethylammonium).

TlCl_{2}
This is formulated as Tl^{I}Tl^{III}Cl_{4}. It is yellow, darkening to orange as it is heated.

Tl_{2}Cl_{3}
This yellow compound is formulated Tl^{I}_{3}Tl^{III}Cl_{6}.

Tl_{2}Br_{3}
This compound is similar to Tl_{2}Cl_{3} and is formulated Tl^{I}_{3}Tl^{III}Br_{6}

TlBr_{2}

This pale brown solid is formulated Tl^{I}Tl^{III}Br_{4}

Tl_{3}I_{4}

This compound has been reported as an intermediate in the synthesis of TlI_{3} from TlI and I_{2}. The structure is not known, but the material is diamagnetic.

== Further information ==
1. Greenwood, Norman N.; Earnshaw, Alan (1997). Chemistry of the Elements (2nd ed.). Butterworth-Heinemann. doi:10.1016/C2009-0-30414-6. ISBN 978-0-08-037941-8.
2. Cotton, F. Albert; Wilkinson, Geoffrey; Murillo, Carlos A.; Bochmann, Manfred (1999), Advanced Inorganic Chemistry (6th ed.), New York: Wiley-Interscience, ISBN 0-471-19957-5
