= Thallium(I) oxide =

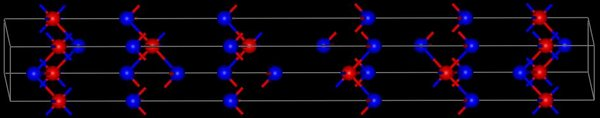

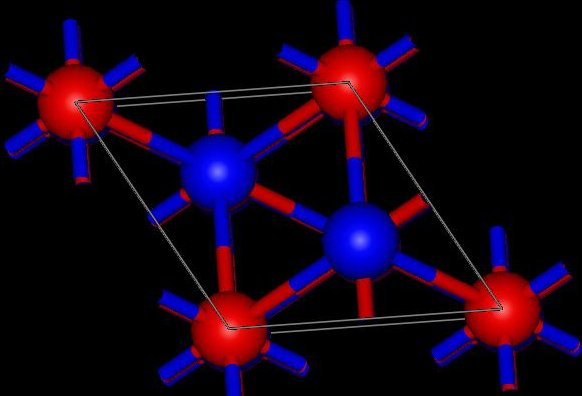

Names
- Other names Thallous oxide

Identifiers
CAS Number	1314-12-1
3D model (JSmol)	Interactive image
ECHA InfoCard	100.013.838
EC Number	215-220-4
PubChem CID	16684203
UNII	LHV2O5DWPQ
CompTox Dashboard (EPA)	DTXSID40894900
- InChI: Key: KFAIYPBIFILLEZ-UHFFFAOYSA-N; InChI=1/O.2Tl/q-2;2*+1
- SMILES: O([Tl])[Tl]

Properties
Chemical formula	Tl_{2}O
Molar mass	424.77 g/mol
Appearance	black orthorhombic crystals hygroscopic
Density	10.45 g/cm^{3}
Melting point	596 °C (1,105 °F; 869 K)
Boiling point	1,080 °C (1,980 °F; 1,350 K) (decomposes)
Solubility in water	soluble (reacts)
Solubility	soluble in alcohol and acid

Structure
Crystal structure	Rhombohedral, hR18
Space group	R-3m, No. 166

Related compounds
Other cations	Thallium(III) oxide
- Except where otherwise noted, data are given for materials in their standard state (at 25 °C [77 °F], 100 kPa). verify (what is ?) Infobox references

Thallium(I) oxide is the inorganic compound of thallium and oxygen with the formula Tl_{2}O in which thallium is in its +1 oxidation state. It is black, hygroscopic, and produces a basic yellow solution of thallium(I) hydroxide (TlOH) when dissolved in water. It is formed by heating solid TlOH or Tl_{2}CO_{3} in the absence of air. Thallium oxide is used to make special high refractive index glass. Thallium oxide is a component of several high temperature superconductors. Thallium(I) oxide reacts with acids to make thallium(I) salts.

Tl_{2}O adopts the anti-cadmium iodide structure in the solid state. In this way, the Tl(I) centers are pyramidal and the oxide centers are octahedral.

Thallium(I) oxide, like all thallium compounds, is highly toxic.

== Preparation ==
Thallium(I) oxide can be produced by decomposition of thallium(I) hydroxide at 100 °C or by heating thallium(III) oxide in the absence of air to 700 °C.

2 TlOH → Tl_{2}O + H_{2}O
Tl_{2}O_{3} → Tl_{2}O + O_{2}
