= Thallium(I) chloride =

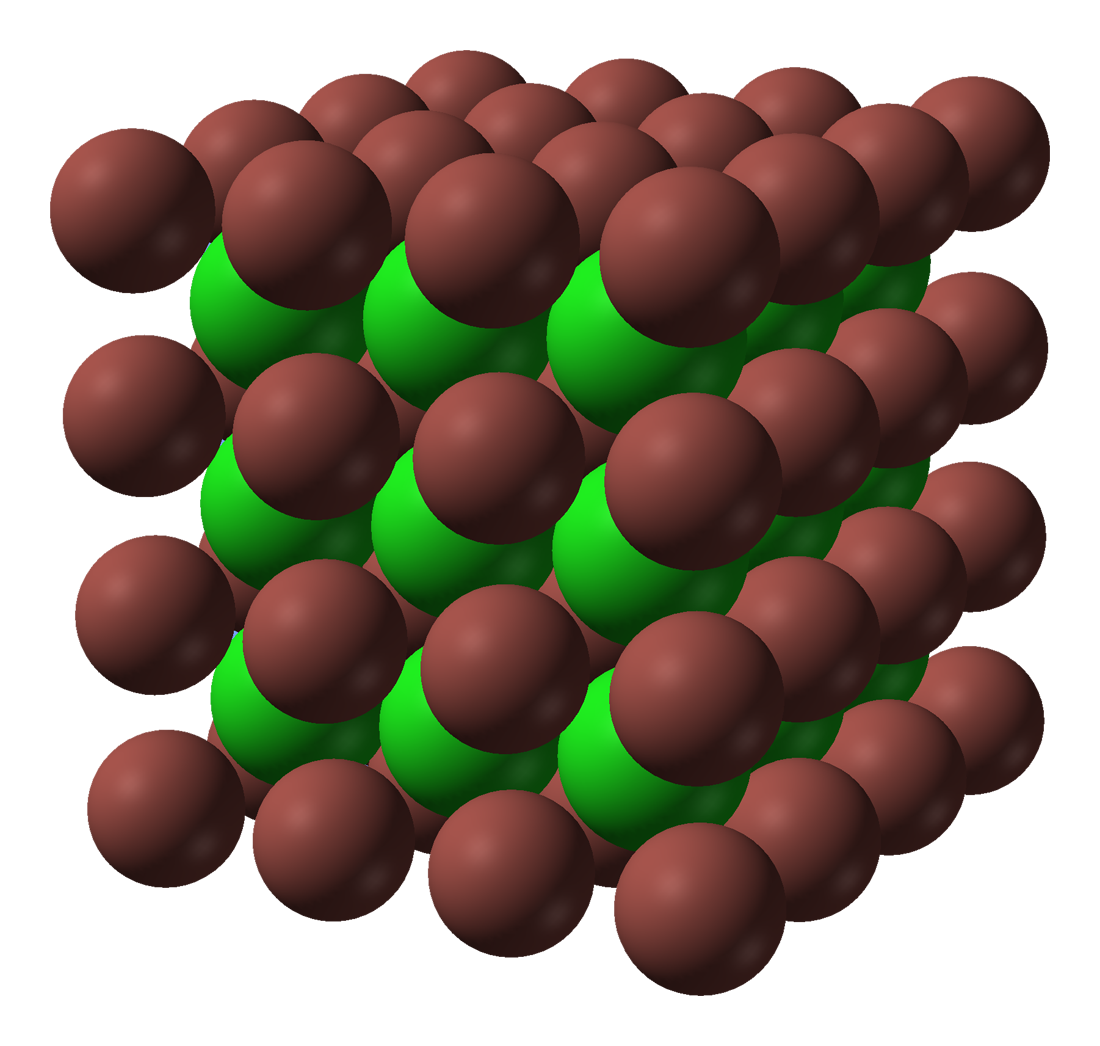

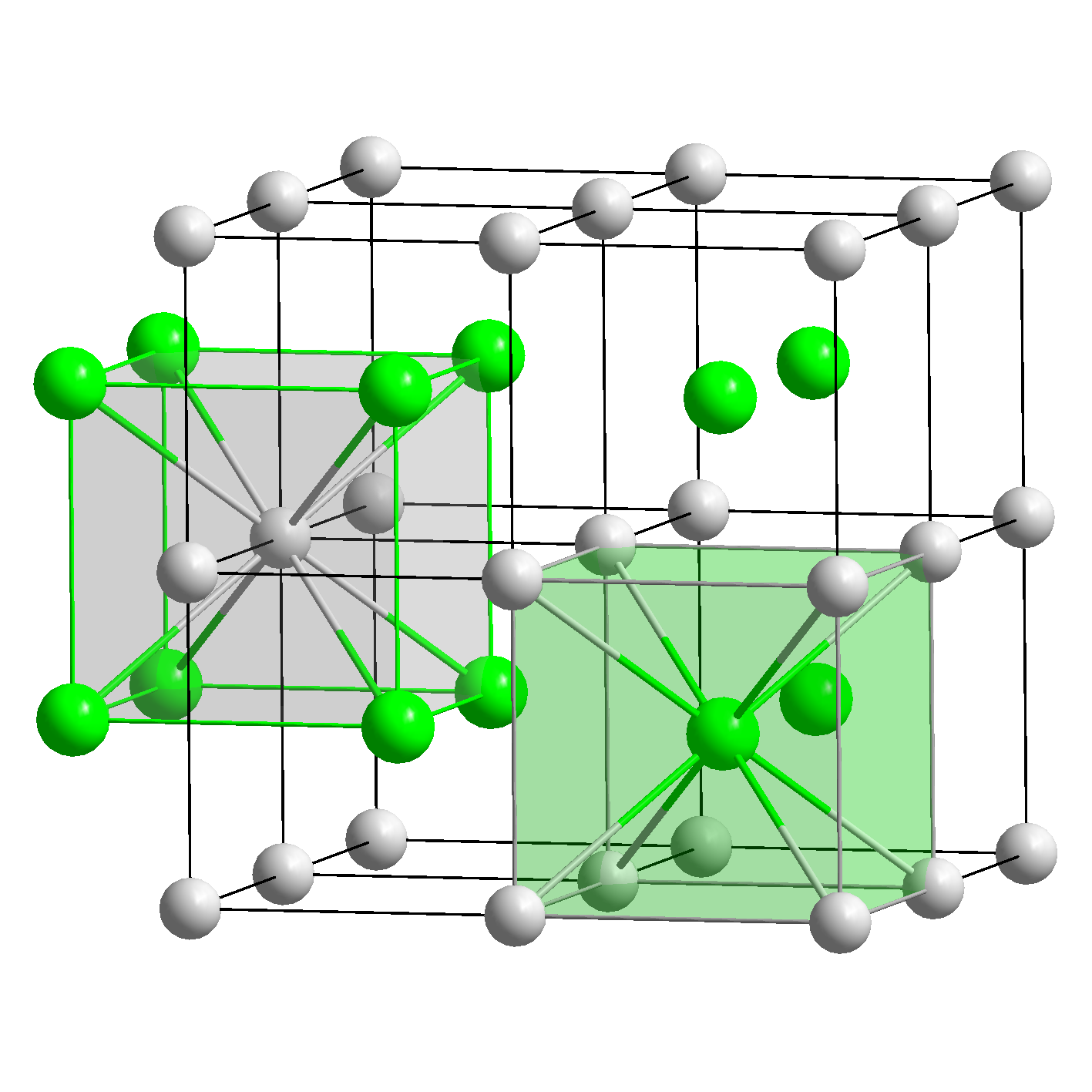

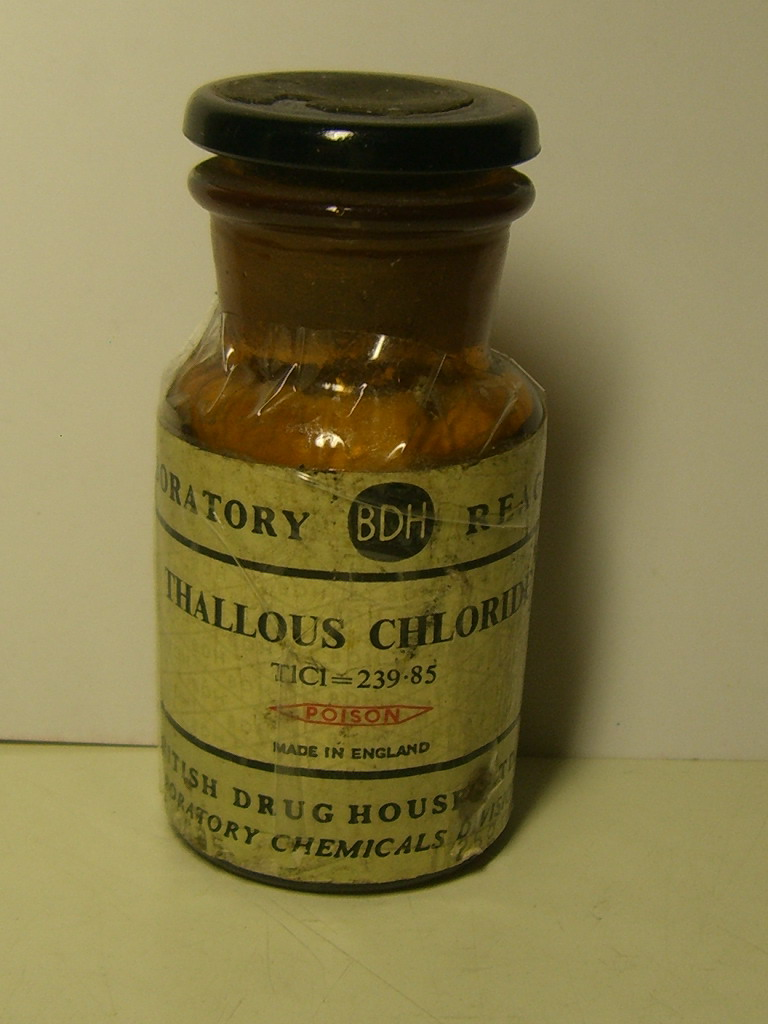

Names
- IUPAC names Thallium monochloride Thallium(I) chloride
- Other names Thallous chloride

Identifiers
CAS Number	7791-12-0
3D model (JSmol)	Interactive image
ChEBI	CHEBI:37117
ChemSpider	23044
DrugBank	DB09316
ECHA InfoCard	100.029.311
EC Number	232-241-4
PubChem CID	24642
UNII	37CB58V15B
UN number	2811 1707
CompTox Dashboard (EPA)	DTXSID6024333
- InChI: InChI=1S/ClH.Tl/h1H;/q;+1/p-1 Key: GBECUEIQVRDUKB-UHFFFAOYSA-M; InChI=1/ClH.Tl/h1H;/q;+1/p-1 Key: GBECUEIQVRDUKB-REWHXWOFAE
- SMILES: Cl[Tl]

Properties
Chemical formula	TlCl
Molar mass	239.836 g/mol
Appearance	white, odorless crystalline solid
Density	7.0 g/cm^{3}
Melting point	431 °C (808 °F; 704 K)
Boiling point	720 °C (1,328 °F; 993 K)
Solubility in water	3.3 g/L (25 °C)
Solubility	insoluble in alcohol
Magnetic susceptibility (χ)	−57.8·10^{−6} cm^{3}/mol
Refractive index (n_{D})	2.247 (0.59 µm); 2.198 (0.75 µm); 2.145 (1 µm); 1.891 (5 µm); 2.193 (20 µm)

Structure
Crystal structure	CsCl, cP2
Space group	Pm3̅m, No. 221
Lattice constant	a = 0.38416 nm
Lattice volume (V)	0.0567 nm^{3}
Formula units (Z)	1
Coordination geometry	Cubic (Tl^{+}); Cubic (Cl^{−})

Hazards
- GHS labelling
Pictograms	(GHS06: Toxic) (GHS08: Health hazard) (GHS09: Environmental hazard)
Signal word	Danger
Hazard statements	H300, H330, H373, H411
Precautionary statements	P260, P264, P270, P271, P273, P284, P301+P310, P304+P340, P310, P314, P320, P321, P330, P391, P403+P233, P405, P501
- Lethal dose or concentration (LD, LC)
LD_{50} (median dose)	24 mg/kg, oral, mouse
Safety data sheet (SDS)	www.crystran.co.uk/uploads/files/178.pdf

Related compounds
Other anions	Thallium(I) fluoride Thallium(I) bromide Thallium(I) iodide
Other cations	Thallium(III) chloride Silver(I) chloride Lead(II) chloride
- Except where otherwise noted, data are given for materials in their standard state (at 25 °C [77 °F], 100 kPa). verify (what is ?) Infobox references

Thallium(I) chloride, also known as thallous chloride, is a chemical compound with the formula TlCl. This colourless salt is an intermediate in the isolation of thallium from its ores. Typically, an acidic solution of thallium(I) sulfate is treated with hydrochloric acid to precipitate insoluble thallium(I) chloride. This solid crystallizes in the caesium chloride motif.

The low solubility of TlCl is exploited in chemical synthesis: treatment of metal chloride complexes with TlPF_{6}, gives the corresponding metal hexafluorophosphate derivative. The resulting TlCl precipitate is separated by filtration of the reaction mixture. The overall methodology is similar to the use of AgPF_{6}, except that Tl^{+} is much less oxidizing.

The crystalline structure is of cubic caesium chloride type at room temperature, but it lowers to the orthorhombic thallium iodide type upon cooling, the transition temperature being likely affected by the impurities. Nanometer-thin TlCl films grown on KBr substrates exhibit a rocksalt structure, while the films deposited on mica or NaCl are of the regular CsCl type.

A very rare mineral lafossaite, Tl(Cl,Br), is a natural form of thallium(I) chloride.

Thallium(I) chloride, like all thallium compounds, is highly toxic, although its low solubility limits its toxicity.

== Cited sources ==
- Haynes, William M., ed. (2011). CRC Handbook of Chemistry and Physics (92nd ed.). Boca Raton, Florida: CRC Press. ISBN 1-4398-5511-0.
