= VRB =

VRB may refer to:

- The IATA code for Vero Beach Regional Airport
- A 'variable' state in METAR weather reports
- Vanadium redox battery
- Vrb, symbol of the mineral vrbaite
