= Thallium(III) nitrate =

Names
- IUPAC name thallium(III) trinitrate
- Other names thallic nitrate

Identifiers
CAS Number	13746-98-0
3D model (JSmol)	Interactive image
ChEBI	CHEBI:229458
ChemSpider	140409
ECHA InfoCard	100.033.918
PubChem CID	159690
UNII	810U72316M
UN number	2727
CompTox Dashboard (EPA)	DTXSID50890716
- InChI: InChI=1S/3NO3.Tl/c3*2-1(3)4;/q3*-1;+3 Key: KLBIUKJOZFWCLW-UHFFFAOYSA-N
- SMILES: [Tl+3].O=[N+]([O-])[O-].[O-][N+]([O-])=O.[O-][N+]([O-])=O

Properties
Chemical formula	Tl(NO_{3})_{3}
Molar mass	390.398 g/mol
Appearance	colorless solid
Density	3.36 g/cm^{3}
Melting point	103 °C (217 °F; 376 K)
Boiling point	decomposes
Solubility in water	reacts

Structure
Crystal structure	hexagonal
Space group	R3̅
Lattice constant	a = 11.821 Å, c = 10.889 Å
Lattice volume (V)	1313.7 Å^{3}

Hazards
- GHS labelling
Pictograms	(GHS03: Oxidizing) (GHS06: Toxic) (GHS08: Health hazard)
Signal word	Danger
NFPA 704 (fire diamond)	4 1 0 OX
- NIOSH (US health exposure limits)
IDLH (Immediate danger)	15 mg/m^{3}
Safety data sheet (SDS)	Fisher Scientific
- Except where otherwise noted, data are given for materials in their standard state (at 25 °C [77 °F], 100 kPa). verify (what is ?) Infobox references

Thallium(III) nitrate, also known as thallic nitrate, is a thallium compound with chemical formula Tl(NO_{3})_{3}. Normally found as the trihydrate, it is a colorless and highly toxic salt which hydrolyses in water to thallium(III) oxide. It is a strong oxidizing agent useful in organic synthesis.

== Preparation ==
The trihydrate is prepared by dissolving thallium(III) oxide in concentrated nitric acid at 80 °C, followed by cooling of the resulting solution:

Tl_{2}O_{3} + 6 HNO_{3} → 2 Tl(NO_{3})_{3} · 3 H_{2}O

Thallous nitrate does not react with dinitrogen pentoxide to give the anhydrous salt; instead [NO][Tl(NO_{3})_{4}] is formed.

== Structure ==
Thallium(III) nitrate trihydrate, Tl(NO_{3})_{3}·3H_{2}O, crystallizes in the hexagonal crystal system and consists of a nine-coordinate thallium center with three bidentate nitrate ligands and three monodentate water ligands.

== Organic synthesis ==
Despite its toxicity, thallium(III) nitrate is sometimes used in the laboratory, such as in the oxidation of methoxyl phenols to quinone acetals:

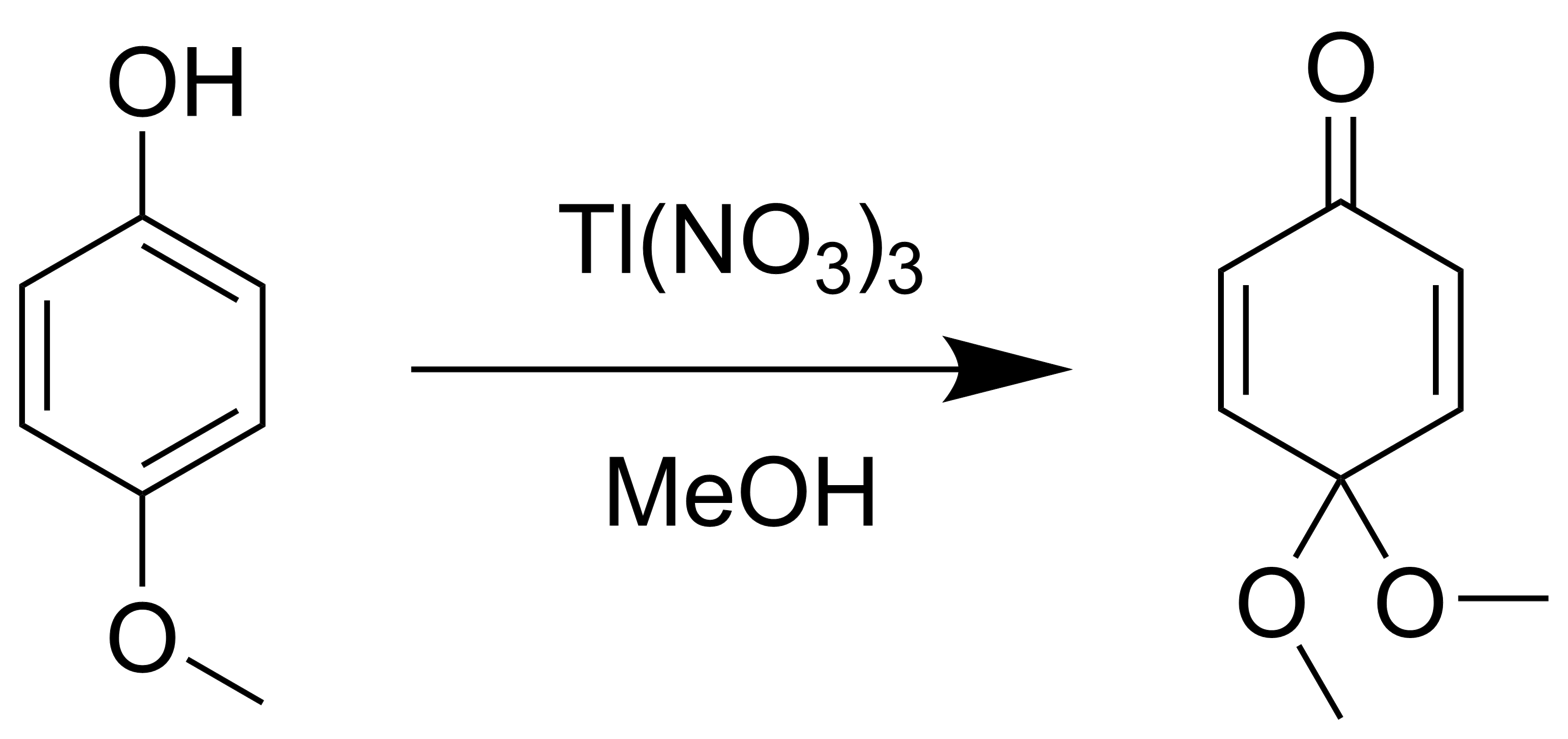

Another use of thallium(III) nitrate is the oxidization of alkenes to acetals, cyclic alkenes to ring contracted aldehydes, and terminal alkynes to carboxylic acids. Ketones are also oxidized to carboxylic acids or esters in the presence of methanol. Illustrated below is an example of alkene oxidation to an acetal:

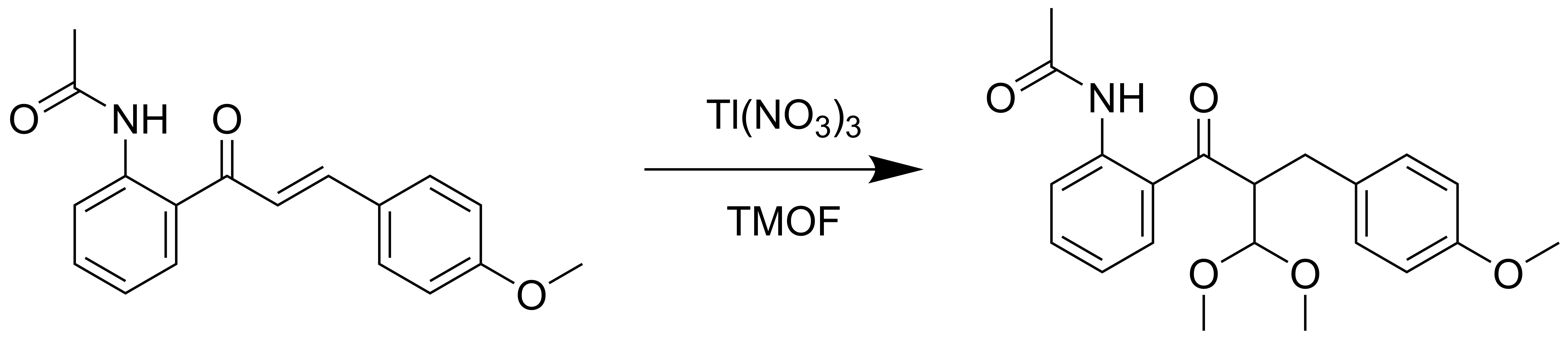
