= Thallium(I) fluoride =

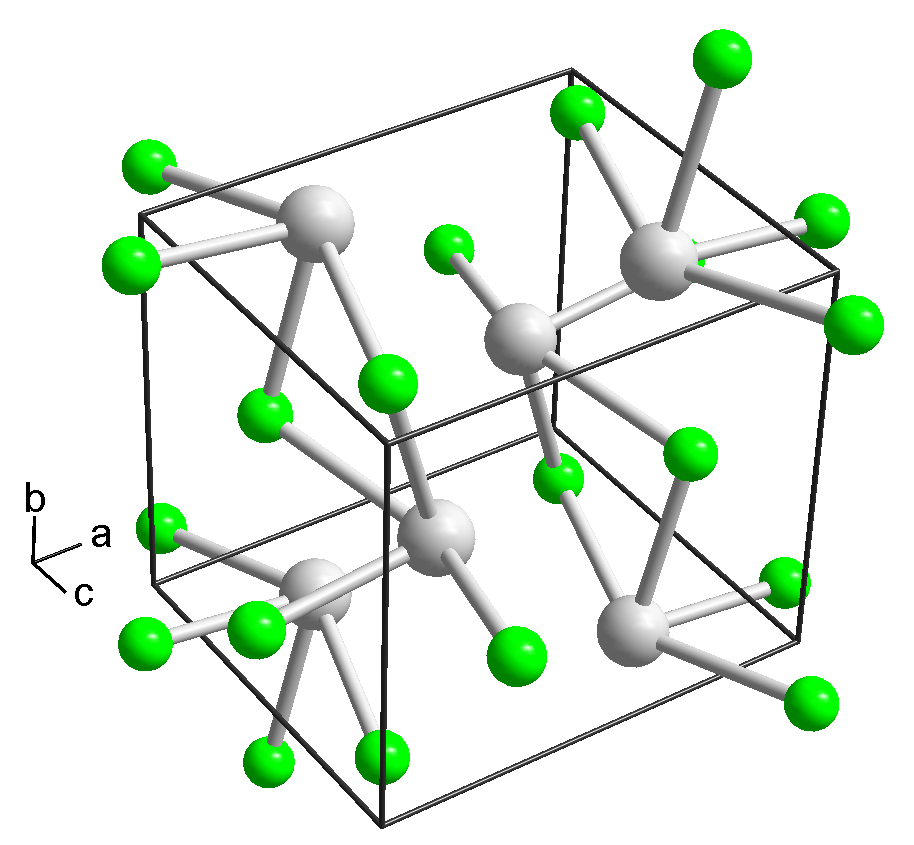

Names
- Preferred IUPAC name Thallium(I) fluoride
- Other names Thallium monofluoride Thallous fluoride

Identifiers
CAS Number	7789-27-7
3D model (JSmol)	Interactive image
ChemSpider	56426
ECHA InfoCard	100.029.231
EC Number	232-154-1
PubChem CID	62675
RTECS number	XG4900000
UNII	GV4Y14VZLX
CompTox Dashboard (EPA)	DTXSID701027537
- InChI: InChI=1S/FH.Tl/h1H;/q;+1/p-1 Key: CULOEOTWMUCRSJ-UHFFFAOYSA-M
- SMILES: F[Tl]

Properties
Chemical formula	TlF
Molar mass	223.3817 g/mol
Appearance	yellow solid
Density	8.36 g cm^{−3}
Melting point	327 °C (621 °F; 600 K)
Boiling point	655 °C (1,211 °F; 928 K) (decomposes)
Solubility in water	78.6 g/100 mL (at 15 °C)
Solubility	slightly soluble in ethanol
Magnetic susceptibility (χ)	−44.4·10^{−6} cm^{3}/mol

Structure
Crystal structure	Orthorhombic, oP8
Space group	Fmmm, No. 28

Hazards
- GHS labelling
Pictograms	(GHS06: Toxic) (GHS08: Health hazard) (GHS09: Environmental hazard)
Signal word	Danger
Hazard statements	H300, H330, H373, H411
Precautionary statements	P260, P264, P270, P271, P273, P284, P301+P310, P304+P340, P310, P314, P320, P321, P330, P391, P403+P233, P405, P501

Related compounds
Other anions	Thallium(I) chloride Thallium(I) bromide Thallium(I) iodide
Other cations	Gallium(III) fluoride Indium(III) fluoride Thallium(III) fluoride
- Except where otherwise noted, data are given for materials in their standard state (at 25 °C [77 °F], 100 kPa). verify (what is ?) Infobox references

Thallium(I) fluoride is the inorganic compound with the formula TlF. It is a white solid, forming orthorhombic crystals. The solid is slightly deliquescent. It has a distorted sodium chloride (rock salt) crystal structure, due to the 6s^{2} inert pair on Tl^{+}.

This salt is unusual among the thallium(I) halides in that it is very soluble in water.

Thallium(I) fluoride can be prepared by the reaction of thallium(I) carbonate with hydrofluoric acid.
