= Allchar deposit =

- Location in Macedonia

Location
- Location: Macedonia; 41°09′25″N 21°56′47″E

Production
- Products: Gold, Thallium

History
- Opened: 1880
- Closed: 1908

The Allchar deposit (alternative spellings Alsar deposit, Alšar deposit or Alshar deposit) is a low-temperature hydrothermal gold–arsenic–antimony–thallium deposit in Kavadarci Municipality of North Macedonia. For some time, the thallium-rich part of the deposit was mined. The Crven Dol mine yielded thallium and the ore body still holds an estimated 500 t of the metal. The mineral lorándite from this ore deposit can be used to determine the solar neutrino flux.

"Mineral collecting at Allchar is only allowed with permission from the University of Skopje. The area will be declared a protected site. In about 2010, several collectors without this permit were arrested by police."

== Geology ==
The deposit is a Carlin–type gold deposit, similar to those found in the Carlin Unconformity, Nevada.

== Mining ==
Mining of arsenic started in the 15th century when the Ottoman Empire ruled this land.

Crven Dol mine operated in the antimony-poor and arsenic- and thallium-rich layer of the orebody. The minerals making most of the orebody are realgar, orpiment, As-bearing pyrite and marcasite. The deposit was mined extensively between 1880 and 1908. Antimony, arsenic and thallium were produced during that period.

== Minerals ==
Pyrite, stibnite, orpiment and realgar are the main minerals forming the ore. Lorándite – a thallium arsenic sulfosalt mineral with formula TlAsS_{2} – is the main thallium mineral in the deposit. Several other thallium minerals have been discovered in the mine over the years; examples include jankovićite (Tl_{5}Sb_{9}(As,Sb)_{4}S_{22}), fangite (Tl_{3}AsS_{4}), bernardite (Tl(Sb,As)_{5}S_{5}) and vrbaite (Tl_{4}Hg_{3}Sb_{2}As_{8}S_{20}).

== LOREX ==
LORándite EXperiment (LOREX) is using lorándite from the ore deposit to determine the solar neutrino flux. This mineral contains large amounts of thallium-205 which undergoes a neutrino capturing reaction and yields lead-205 in the process. The ^{205}Tl(ν_{e},e^{−})^{205}Pb process has a relatively low threshold energy of 52 keV and thus relatively high efficiency. With the age of the deposit of 4.5 to 4.2 million years, the solar neutrino flux can be estimated over the last 4 million years provided it is possible to determine the amount of lead-205 in a lorándite sample. This reaction can be induced not only by neutrino but other high energy cosmic particles, which all have different penetration depth in the crust. Therefore, a large volume of data is being accumulated during 2008–2010 from different depths of the deposit to produce reliable data.
