= Thallium(III) oxide =

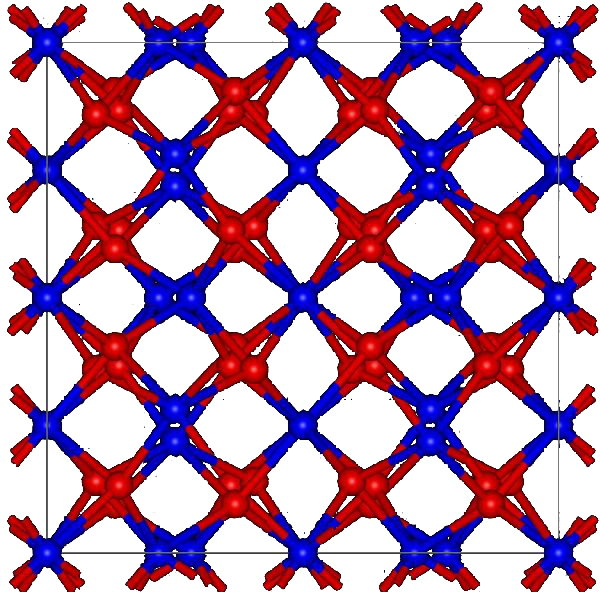
- Thallium(III) oxide

Names
- Other names thallium trioxide, thallium sesquioxide

Identifiers
CAS Number	1314-32-5
3D model (JSmol)	Interactive image
ChemSpider	7979876
ECHA InfoCard	100.013.846
EC Number	215-229-3
PubChem CID	9804116
UNII	8C7MZ48UJ1
CompTox Dashboard (EPA)	DTXSID1024330
- InChI: InChI=1S/3O.2Tl/q3*-2;2*+3 Key: LPHBARMWKLYWRA-UHFFFAOYSA-N
- SMILES: [O-2].[O-2].[O-2].[Tl+3].[Tl+3]

Properties
Chemical formula	Tl_{2}O_{3}
Molar mass	456.76 g/mol
Appearance	dark brown solid
Density	10.19 g/cm^{3}, solid (22 °C)
Melting point	717 °C (1,323 °F; 990 K)
Boiling point	875 °C (1,607 °F; 1,148 K) (decomposes)
Solubility in water	insoluble
Magnetic susceptibility (χ)	+76.0·10^{−6} cm^{3}/mol

Structure
Crystal structure	Cubic, (Bixbyite) cI80
Space group	Ia3̅ (No. 206)

Hazards
- GHS labelling
Pictograms	(GHS06: Toxic) (GHS08: Health hazard) (GHS09: Environmental hazard)
Signal word	Danger
Hazard statements	H300+H330, H373, H411
Precautionary statements	P273, P301+P310+P330, P304+P340+P310, P314
NFPA 704 (fire diamond)	4 0 0 OX
- Lethal dose or concentration (LD, LC)
LD_{50} (median dose)	44 mg/kg (oral, rat)
- Except where otherwise noted, data are given for materials in their standard state (at 25 °C [77 °F], 100 kPa). verify (what is ?) Infobox references

Thallium(III) oxide, also known as thallic oxide, is a chemical compound of thallium and oxygen. It occurs in nature as the rare mineral avicennite. Its structure is related to that of Mn_{2}O_{3} which has a bixbyite like structure. Tl_{2}O_{3} is metallic with high conductivity and is a degenerate n-type semiconductor which may have potential use in solar cells. A method of producing Tl_{2}O_{3} by MOCVD is known. Any practical use of thallium(III) oxide will always have to take account of thallium's poisonous nature.

== Production ==
It is produced by the reaction of thallium with oxygen or hydrogen peroxide in an alkaline thallium(I) solution. Alternatively, it can be created by the oxidation of thallium(I) nitrate by chlorine in an aqueous potassium hydroxide solution.
