= Thallium trifluoride =

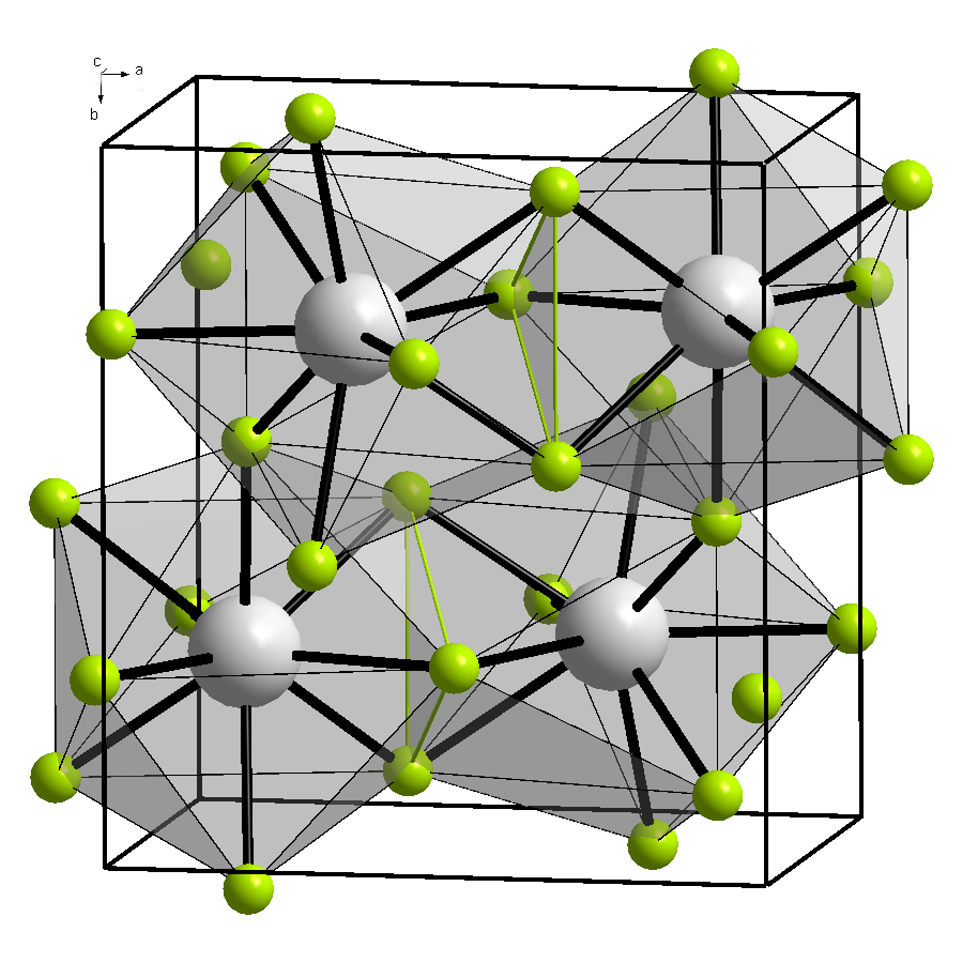

Identifiers
| CAS Number | 7783-57-5 |
| 3D model (JSmol) | Interactive image |
| ChemSpider | 74194 |
| ECHA InfoCard | 100.029.100 |
| EC Number | 232-010-8 |
| PubChem CID | 53443050 |
| UNII | ZJ85SF5XFJ |
| CompTox Dashboard (EPA) | DTXSID6064828 |
- InChI: InChI=1S/3FH.Tl/h3*1H;/q;;;+3/p-3 Key: BOUDEKXATYHWHY-UHFFFAOYSA-K
- SMILES: [F-].[F-].[F-].[Tl+3]

Properties
| Chemical formula | TlF_{3} |
| Appearance | white solid |
| Density | 8.36 g/cm^{3} |
| Melting point | 550 °C (1,022 °F; 823 K) |

Hazards
- GHS labelling
| Pictograms | (GHS06: Toxic) (GHS08: Health hazard) (GHS09: Environmental hazard) |
| Signal word | Danger |
| Hazard statements | H300, H330, H373, H411 |
| Precautionary statements | P260, P264, P270, P271, P273, P284, P301+P310, P304+P340, P310, P314, P320, P321, P330, P391, P403+P233, P405, P501 |

Related compounds
| Other anions | Thallium(III) chloride |
| Other cations | Aluminum fluoride Gallium(III) fluoride Thallium(I) fluoride |
- Except where otherwise noted, data are given for materials in their standard state (at 25 °C [77 °F], 100 kPa). Infobox references

Thallium trifluoride is the inorganic compound with the formula TlF_{3}. It is a white, hygroscopic solid. It is one of two thallium fluorides, the other being thallium monofluoride. The It adopts the same structure as bismuth trifluoride, featuring eight-coordinate Tl(III) centers. Some evidence exists for a second polymorph.

It is prepared by treating thallium(III) oxide with fluorine gas at 300 °C.
