= Thallium(I) nitrate =

Names
- IUPAC name thallium(I) nitrate
- Other names thallous nitrate

Identifiers
CAS Number	10102-45-1
3D model (JSmol)	Interactive image
ChemSpider	23311
ECHA InfoCard	100.030.235
EC Number	233-273-1
PubChem CID	24937
UNII	LJQ38DSR12
CompTox Dashboard (EPA)	DTXSID1024334
- InChI: InChI=1S/NO3.Tl/c2-1(3)4;/q-1;+1 Key: FYWSTUCDSVYLPV-UHFFFAOYSA-N
- SMILES: [Tl+].[O-][N+](=O)[O-]

Properties
Chemical formula	TlNO_{3}
Molar mass	266.39 g/mol
Appearance	colorless solid
Density	5.55 g/cm^{3}
Melting point	206 °C (403 °F; 479 K)
Boiling point	430 °C (806 °F; 703 K)
Solubility in water	95 g/L (20 °C)

Hazards
- GHS labelling
Pictograms	(GHS03: Oxidizing) (GHS06: Toxic) (GHS08: Health hazard) (GHS09: Environmental hazard)
Signal word	Danger
Hazard statements	H272, H300+H330, H373, H411
Precautionary statements	P210, P260, P273, P301+P310+P330, P304+P340+P310, P403+P233
NFPA 704 (fire diamond)	4 1 2 OX
- Lethal dose or concentration (LD, LC)
LD_{50} (median dose)	15 mg/kg (mouse, oral)
Safety data sheet (SDS)	Fischer Scientific
- Except where otherwise noted, data are given for materials in their standard state (at 25 °C [77 °F], 100 kPa). Infobox references

Thallium(I) nitrate, also known as thallous nitrate, is a thallium compound with the formula TlNO_{3}. It is a colorless and highly toxic salt.

== Preparation ==
Thallium(I) nitrate can be produced by reacting thallium(I) iodide with nitric acid.

However, the production is simpler starting from the metal, its hydroxide or the carbonate:

TlOH + HNO_{3} → TlNO_{3} + H_{2}O

Tl_{2}CO_{3} + 2 HNO_{3} → 2 TlNO_{3} + CO_{2} + H_{2}O

== Properties ==
Thallous nitrate adopts an orthorhombic crystal structure at room temperature, changing to hexagonal at 79 °C and cubic at 144.6 °C. The former two phases are defect conductors.

Thallium(I) nitrate is extremely toxic, like many other thallium compounds. It is highly toxic by ingestion but can also be absorbed through skin due to its solubility in water.

== See also ==
- Thallium(III) nitrate
