= Thallium(I) bromide =

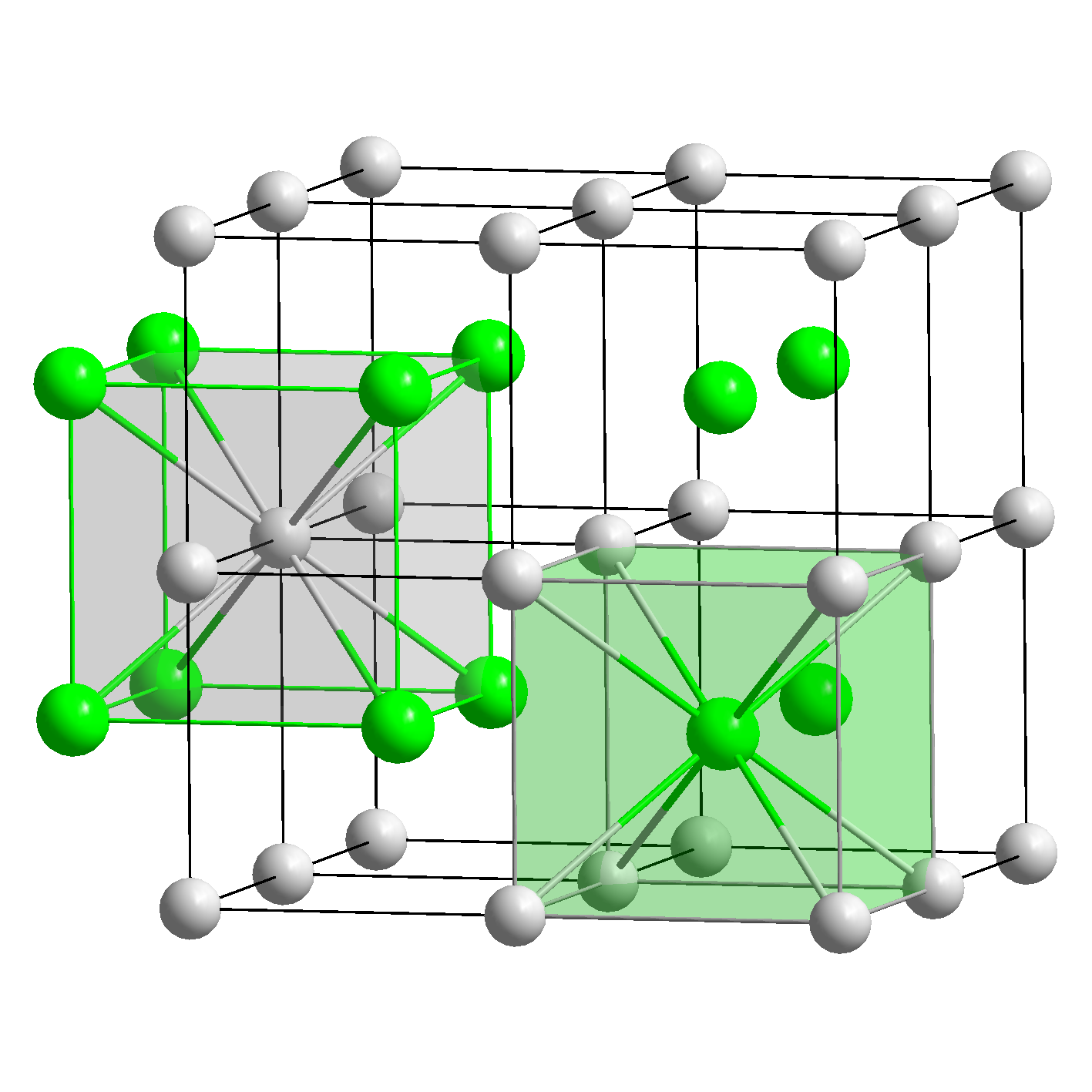
- Thallium(I) bromide

Names
- Other names Thallium monobromide

Identifiers
CAS Number	7789-40-4
3D model (JSmol)	Interactive image
ChemSpider	56428
ECHA InfoCard	100.029.239
EC Number	232-163-0
PubChem CID	62677
UNII	W18FF0756H
CompTox Dashboard (EPA)	DTXSID20894983
- InChI: InChI=1S/BrH.Tl/h1H;/q;+1/p-1 Key: PGAPATLGJSQQBU-UHFFFAOYSA-M; InChI=1/BrH.Tl/h1H;/q;+1/p-1 Key: PGAPATLGJSQQBU-REWHXWOFAZ
- SMILES: Br[Tl]

Properties
Chemical formula	TlBr
Molar mass	284.287 g/mol
Appearance	yellow crystalline solid
Density	7.5 g/cm^{3}
Melting point	460 °C (860 °F; 733 K)
Boiling point	819 °C (1,506 °F; 1,092 K)
Solubility in water	0.59 g/mL (25 °C)
Solubility product (K_{sp})	3.71×10^{−6}
Magnetic susceptibility (χ)	−63.9·10^{−6} cm^{3}/mol
Refractive index (n_{D})	2.418 (0.59 μm); 2.350 (0.75 μm); 2.289 (1 μm); 1.984 (5 μm); 2.322 (20 μm)

Structure
Crystal structure	CsCl, cP2
Space group	Pm3̅m, No. 221
Formula units (Z)	1
Coordination geometry	Cubic (Tl^{+}); Cubic (Br^{−})

Hazards
- GHS labelling
Pictograms	(GHS06: Toxic) (GHS08: Health hazard) (GHS09: Environmental hazard)
Signal word	Danger
Hazard statements	H300, H330, H373, H411
Precautionary statements	P260, P264, P270, P271, P273, P284, P301+P310, P304+P340, P310, P314, P320, P321, P330, P391, P403+P233, P405, P501

Related compounds
Other anions	Thallium(I) fluoride, Thallium(I) chloride, Thallium(I) iodide
Other cations	Indium(I) bromide, Lead(II) bromide Bismuth bromide
- Except where otherwise noted, data are given for materials in their standard state (at 25 °C [77 °F], 100 kPa). verify (what is ?) Infobox references

Thallium(I) bromide is a chemical compound of thallium and bromine with a chemical formula TlBr. This salt is used in room-temperature detectors of X-rays, gamma-rays and blue light, as well as in near-infrared optics.

It is a semiconductor with a band gap of 2.68 eV.

The crystalline structure is of cubic CsCl type at room temperature, but it lowers to the orthorhombic thallium iodide type upon cooling, the transition temperature being likely affected by the impurities. Nanometer-thin TlBr films grown on LiF, NaCl or KBr substrates exhibit a rocksalt structure.

Like all soluble thallium salts, thallium bromide is extremely toxic and a cumulative poison which can be absorbed through the skin. Acute and chronic effects of ingesting thallium compounds include fatigue, limb pain, peripheral neuritis, joint pain, loss of hair, diarrhea, vomiting, vision loss, and damage to the central nervous system, liver and kidneys.

== Cited sources ==
- Haynes, William M., ed. (2011). CRC Handbook of Chemistry and Physics (92nd ed.). Boca Raton, Florida: CRC Press. ISBN 1-4398-5511-0.
