= Thallium(I) iodide =

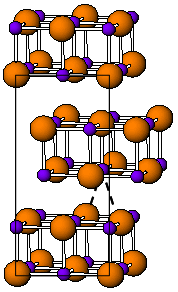
- Thallium(I) iodide

Names
- Other names Thallium monoiodide Thallous iodide

Identifiers
CAS Number	7790-30-9
3D model (JSmol)	Interactive image
ChemSpider	56430
ECHA InfoCard	100.029.272
EC Number	232-199-7
PubChem CID	62679
UNII	98W17EMO3C
CompTox Dashboard (EPA)	DTXSID10894795
- InChI: InChI=1S/HI.Tl/h1H;/q;+1/p-1 Key: CMJCEVKJYRZMIA-UHFFFAOYSA-M; InChI=1/HI.Tl/h1H;/q;+1/p-1 Key: CMJCEVKJYRZMIA-REWHXWOFAG
- SMILES: I[Tl]

Properties
Chemical formula	TlI
Molar mass	331.287 g/mol
Appearance	yellow crystals
Density	7.1 g/cm^{3}
Melting point	441.7 °C (827.1 °F; 714.8 K)
Boiling point	824 °C (1,515 °F; 1,097 K)
Solubility in water	0.085 g/L (25 °C)
Solubility	insoluble in alcohol
Magnetic susceptibility (χ)	−82.2·10^{−6} cm^{3}/mol

Hazards
- GHS labelling
Pictograms	(GHS06: Toxic) (GHS08: Health hazard) (GHS09: Environmental hazard)
Signal word	Danger
Hazard statements	H300, H330, H373, H411
Precautionary statements	P260, P264, P270, P271, P273, P284, P301+P310, P304+P340, P310, P314, P320, P321, P330, P391, P403+P233, P405, P501
Flash point	Non-flammable

Related compounds
Other anions	Thallium(I) fluoride Thallium(I) chloride Thallium(I) bromide
Other cations	Gallium(I) iodide Indium(I) iodide
Related compounds	Mercury(II) iodide Lead(II) iodide
- Except where otherwise noted, data are given for materials in their standard state (at 25 °C [77 °F], 100 kPa). verify (what is ?) Infobox references

Thallium(I) iodide is a chemical compound with the formula TlI. It is exists as both a solid and high temperature red polymorph. Thallium(I) iodide is one of several water-insoluble metal iodides, along with AgI, CuI, SnI_{2}, SnI_{4}, PbI_{2}, and HgI_{2}.

== Synthesis and reactions ==
TlI can be formed in aqueous solution by metathesis of soluble thallium salt with iodide ion. Alternatively, it has been prepared from the elements:

2 Tl + I_{2} → 2TlI

An excess of iodine produces thallium(I) triiodide, Tl^{+}I_{3}^{−}.

== Physical properties ==
The room temperature form of TlI is yellow and has an orthorhombic structure, which can be considered to be a distorted NaCl structure. The distorted structure is may be caused by favorable thallium–thallium interactions, the closest Tl–Tl distance is 383 pm. At 175 °C the yellow form transforms to a red CsCl form. This phase transition is accompanied by about two orders of magnitude jump in electrical conductivity. The CsI structure can be stabilized down to room temperature by doping TlI with other halides such as RbI, CsI, KI, AgI, TlBr and TlCl. Thus, presence of impurities might be responsible for coexistence of the cubic and orthorhombic TlI phases at ambient conditions. Under high pressure, 160 kbar, TlI becomes a metallic conductor. Nanometer-thin TlI films grown on LiF, NaCl or KBr substrates exhibit the cubic rocksalt structure.

== Applications ==
Thallium(I) iodide was initially added to mercury arc lamps to improve their performance The light produced was mainly in the blue green part of the visible light spectrum least absorbed by water, so these have been used for underwater lighting. In modern times, it is added to quartz and ceramic metal halide lamps that uses rare-earth halides like dysprosium, to increase their efficiency and to get the light color more close to the blackbody locus. Thallium iodide alone can be used to produces green colored metal halide lamps. Thallium(I) iodide is also used in trace amounts with NaI or CsI to produce scintillators used in radiation detectors.

== Natural occurrence ==
Thallium(I) iodide is a rare mineral called nataliyamalikite. Small grains were found embedded in mascagnite sourced from fumaroles at Avachinsky, a volcano in Russia's Kamchatka Peninsula that can reach temperatures of 640 °C (1,184 °F).

== Safety ==
Like all thallium compounds, thallium(I) iodide is highly toxic with an LD50 of 24.1mg/kg in rats.

== Cited sources ==
- Haynes, William M., ed. (2011). CRC Handbook of Chemistry and Physics (92nd ed.). Boca Raton, Florida: CRC Press. ISBN 1-4398-5511-0.
