= Indium(I) iodide =

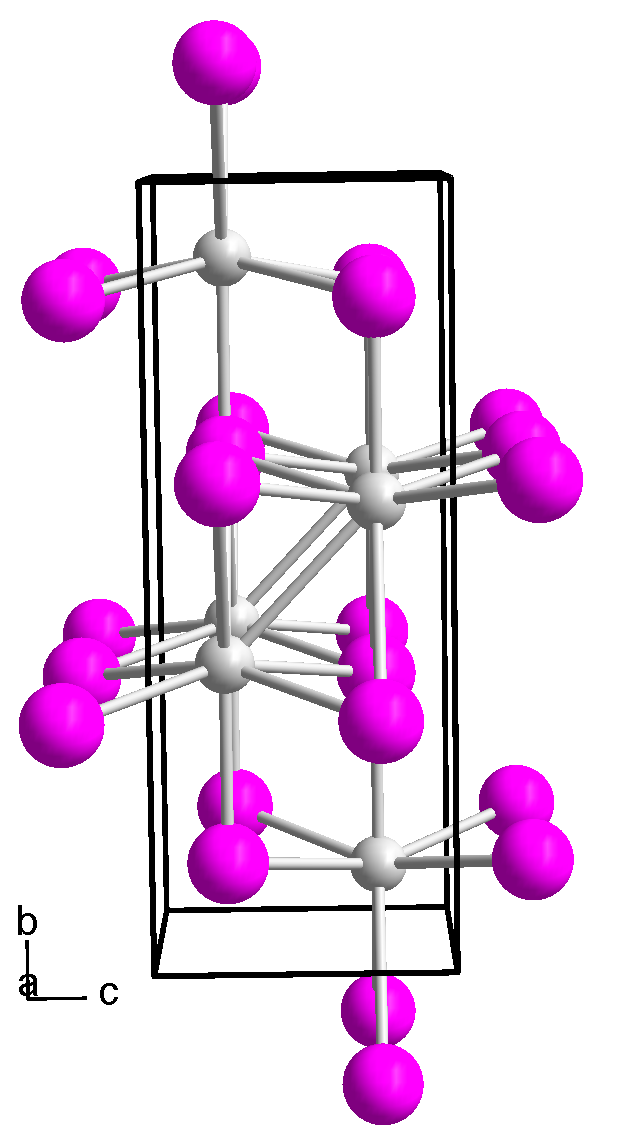

Names
- IUPAC name iodoindium
- Other names Indium monoiodide

Identifiers
CAS Number	13966-94-4
3D model (JSmol)	Interactive image
ChemSpider	21241509
ECHA InfoCard	100.034.301
EC Number	237-746-3
PubChem CID	6336605
UNII	464T9WI802
CompTox Dashboard (EPA)	DTXSID201014406
- InChI: InChI=1S/HI.In/h1H;/q;+1/p-1 Key: FOVZCYAIUZHXGB-UHFFFAOYSA-M
- SMILES: [In]I

Properties
Chemical formula	IIn
Molar mass	241.722 g·mol^{−1}
Appearance	red-brown solid
Density	5.32 g/cm^{3}
Melting point	365 °C (689 °F; 638 K)
Solubility in water	insoluble

Hazards
- GHS labelling
Pictograms	(GHS07: Exclamation mark) (GHS08: Health hazard)
Signal word	Danger
Hazard statements	H302, H315, H319, H334, H335
Precautionary statements	P301, P302, P305, P312, P330, P338, P351, P352
- Except where otherwise noted, data are given for materials in their standard state (at 25 °C [77 °F], 100 kPa). Infobox references

Indium monoiodide is a binary inorganic compound of indium metal and iodine with the chemical formula InI.

== Preparation ==
Indium(I) iodide can be obtained by reacting indium with iodine or indium(III) iodide in vacuum at 300 °C to 400 °C or with mercury(II) iodide at 350 °C.

2In + I_{2} → 2InI
2In + InI_{3} → 3InI
2In + HgI_{2} → 2InI + Hg

== Physical properties ==
Indium(I) iodide forms a brown-red diamagnetic solid. Its melt is black. The compound has an orthorhombic crystal structure in the space group Cmcm (space group no. 63) with the lattice parameters a = 475 pm, b = 1276 pm, c = 491 pm.

== Chemical properties ==
Decomposes slowly with hot water:

2InI + H_{2}O → InOH + HI

Reacts with water in the presence of oxygen:

2InI + O + 3H_{2}O → 2In(OH)_{2} + 2HI
