= Vrbaite =

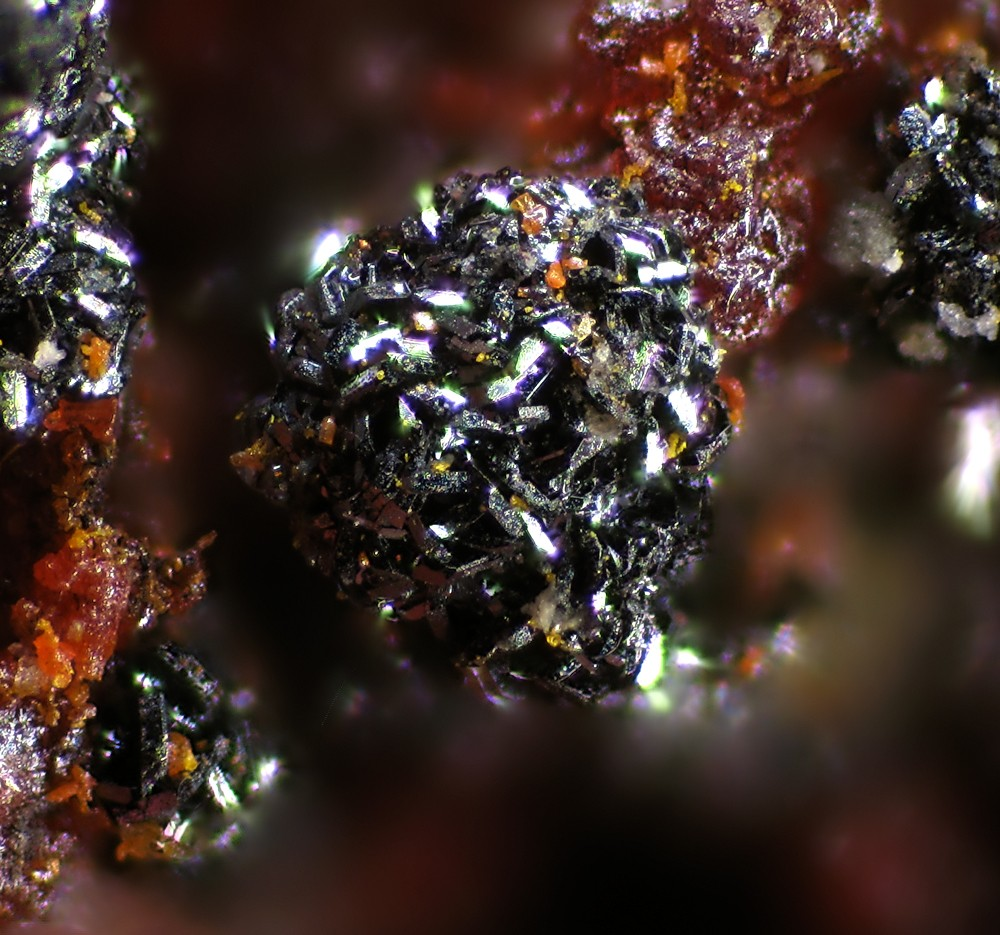
- Vrbaïte, Crven Dol Mine, Allchar (Alsar), Roszdan, North Macedonia

General
- Category: Minerals
- Formula: Tl4Hg3Sb2As8S2
- Strunz classification: 2 SULFIDES and SULFOSALTS (sulfides, selenides, tellurides; arsenides, antimonides, bismuthides; sulfarsenites, sulfantimonites, sulfbismuthites, etc.) 2.H Sulfosalts of SnS Archetype; 2.HF With SnS and PbS archetype structure units 2.HF.20 Vrbaite Tl4Hg3Sb2As8S20; Space Group C mca Point Group 2/m 2/m 2/m
- Dana classification: 03.07.15.01
- Crystal system: orthorhombic
- Crystal class: Dipyramidal ; $C$ $mca$ {C 2/m 2/c 2India/a}

Identification
- Color: black, gray-black, bluish, dark red; on polished sections, bluish white with internal red highlights
- Fracture: uneven/irregular to conchoidal
- Tenacity: 3,5
- Density: 5,27-5,33
- Refractive index: n = 2,72-2,73
- Dispersion: r > v
- Ultraviolet fluorescence: aucune
- Absorption spectra: opaque

Vrbaite (symbol: Vrb) is an opaque to subtranslucent brittle mineral with chemical formula Tl_{4}Hg_{3}Sb_{2}As_{8}S_{20} and pyramidal crystals. It is names after Czech mineralogist Karel Vrba. It is bluish white with red internal reflections and dark red in translucent thin fragments. It is classified in the class "sulfides and sulfosalts".

Type locality: Allchar deposit, Ržanovo mine, Kavadarci Municipality, North Macedonia.
