= Lanthanum perchlorate =

Names
- Other names Lanthanum(III) perchlorate

Identifiers
CAS Number	14017-46-0; hexahydrate: 36907-37-6; octahydrate: 14692-25-2
3D model (JSmol)	Interactive image; hexahydrate: Interactive image; octahydrate: Interactive image; nonahydrate: Interactive image
ChemSpider	146104
ECHA InfoCard	100.034.382
EC Number	237-835-7
PubChem CID	166977; hexahydrate: 44135853; octahydrate: 129693113; nonahydrate: 129772998
CompTox Dashboard (EPA)	DTXSID10890737; hexahydrate: DTXSID00657614
- InChI: InChI=1S/3ClHO4.La/c3*2-1(3,4)5;/h3*(H,2,3,4,5);/q;;;+3/p-3 Key: MYGVQOYLIMJKKU-UHFFFAOYSA-K; hexahydrate: InChI=1S/3ClHO4.La.6H2O/c3*2-1(3,4)5;;;;;;;/h3*(H,2,3,4,5);;6*1H2/q;;;+3;;;;;;/p-3 Key: DCEUOMQVLPJQAI-UHFFFAOYSA-K; octahydrate: InChI=1S/3ClHO4.La.8H2O/c3*2-1(3,4)5;;;;;;;;;/h3*(H,2,3,4,5);;8*1H2/q;;;+3;;;;;;;;/p-3 Key: LZXPCWXKFGTVEQ-UHFFFAOYSA-K; nonahydrate: InChI=1S/3ClHO4.La.9H2O/c3*2-1(3,4)5;;;;;;;;;;/h3*(H,2,3,4,5);;9*1H2/q;;;+3;;;;;;;;;/p-3 Key: BVJVBEDELJHGQY-UHFFFAOYSA-K
- SMILES: [O-]Cl(=O)(=O)=O.[O-]Cl(=O)(=O)=O.[O-]Cl(=O)(=O)=O.[La+3]; hexahydrate: O.O.O.O.O.O.[O-]Cl(=O)(=O)=O.[O-]Cl(=O)(=O)=O.[O-]Cl(=O)(=O)=O.[La+3]; octahydrate: O.O.O.O.O.O.O.O.[O-]Cl(=O)(=O)=O.[O-]Cl(=O)(=O)=O.[O-]Cl(=O)(=O)=O.[La+3]; nonahydrate: O.O.O.O.O.O.O.O.O.[O-]Cl(=O)(=O)=O.[O-]Cl(=O)(=O)=O.[O-]Cl(=O)(=O)=O.[La+3]

Properties
Chemical formula	La(ClO_{4})_{3}
Molar mass	437.26 g/mol
Appearance	Colorless crystalline solid (hydrates)
Solubility in water	Very soluble in water

Structure
Crystal structure	Hexagonal (anhydrous)
Space group	P6_{3}/m, No. 176
Formula units (Z)	2

Hazards
- GHS labelling
Pictograms	(GHS03: Oxidizing) (GHS07: Exclamation mark)
Signal word	Danger
Hazard statements	H272, H315, H319
Precautionary statements	P210, P220, P264, P264+P265, P280, P302+P352, P305+P351+P338, P321, P332+P317, P337+P317, P362+P364, P370+P378, P501
- Except where otherwise noted, data are given for materials in their standard state (at 25 °C [77 °F], 100 kPa). Infobox references

Lanthanum perchlorate is an inorganic compound of lanthanum and the perchlorate ion, with the chemical formula La(ClO_{4})_{3}. It is known in anhydrous form and as hydrated salts, including the octahydrate. The anhydrous compound crystallizes in the hexagonal structure adopted by many of the lighter rare-earth perchlorates.

== Preparation ==
Hydrated lanthanum perchlorate can be prepared by dissolving lanthanum(III) oxide, lanthanum hydroxide or lanthanum carbonate in perchloric acid:

La_{2}O_{3} + 6 HClO_{4} → 2 La(ClO_{4})_{3} + 3 H_{2}O

Anhydrous La(ClO_{4})_{3} has been obtained by dehydrating the products formed by evaporation of solutions of La_{2}O_{3} in approximately 70% perchloric acid.

== Properties ==
=== Anhydrous structure ===
Anhydrous La(ClO_{4})_{3} crystallizes in the hexagonal crystal system, space group P6_{3}/m (No. 176), with two formula units per unit cell.

It is the largest-cell member of the hexagonal lanthanide-perchlorate series. Across the series from La to the later lanthanides, the lattice parameters decrease progressively as a result of the lanthanide contraction.

Lanthanum is nine-coordinate in the anhydrous structure. The LaO_{9} coordination environment is formed by oxygen atoms from perchlorate groups, which act as tridentate ligands and connect the metal centres into a three-dimensional framework containing channels.

The structure is related to the UCl_{3} structure type.

=== Hydrates ===
Lanthanum perchlorate readily forms hydrates on crystallization from aqueous solution. The octahydrate, La(ClO_{4})_{3}·8H_{2}O, is a commonly reported form.

More highly and less highly hydrated rare-earth perchlorates can form depending on temperature, concentration and drying conditions.

=== Aqueous solution ===
In dilute aqueous lanthanum perchlorate, La^{3+} is present predominantly as the nona-aqua ion [La(H_{2}O)_{9}]^{3+}.

The first hydration shell has a tricapped trigonal-prismatic arrangement of nine water molecules. Perchlorate behaves mainly as a weakly coordinating counterion in dilute solution.

At higher La(ClO_{4})_{3} concentrations, outer-sphere and contact ion pairs increasingly form between La^{3+} and ClO_{4}^{−}.

== Coordination chemistry ==
Lanthanum perchlorate is used as a soluble source of La^{3+} in coordination chemistry, particularly when a weakly coordinating counterion is desirable.

The salt is used in the preparation of lanthanum complexes with crown ethers, macrocycles and other oxygen- or nitrogen-donor ligands.

== Safety ==
Lanthanum perchlorate is an oxidizing perchlorate salt and should be kept away from combustible and strongly reducing materials.
