= Thallium =

Thallium, _{81}Tl
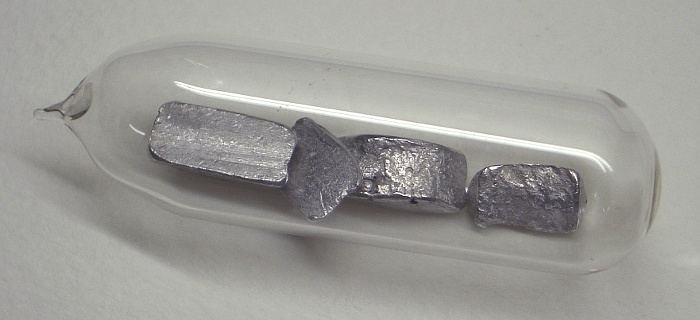

Thallium
- Pronunciation: /ˈθæliəm/ (THAL-ee-əm)
- Appearance: silvery white

Standard atomic weight A_{r}°(Tl)
- [204.382, 204.385]; 204.38±0.01 (abridged)

Thallium in the periodic table
Hydrogen																															Helium
Lithium	Beryllium																									Boron	Carbon	Nitrogen	Oxygen	Fluorine	Neon
Sodium	Magnesium																									Aluminium	Silicon	Phosphorus	Sulfur	Chlorine	Argon
Potassium	Calcium															Scandium	Titanium	Vanadium	Chromium	Manganese	Iron	Cobalt	Nickel	Copper	Zinc	Gallium	Germanium	Arsenic	Selenium	Bromine	Krypton
Rubidium	Strontium															Yttrium	Zirconium	Niobium	Molybdenum	Technetium	Ruthenium	Rhodium	Palladium	Silver	Cadmium	Indium	Tin	Antimony	Tellurium	Iodine	Xenon
Caesium	Barium	Lanthanum	Cerium	Praseodymium	Neodymium	Promethium	Samarium	Europium	Gadolinium	Terbium	Dysprosium	Holmium	Erbium	Thulium	Ytterbium	Lutetium	Hafnium	Tantalum	Tungsten	Rhenium	Osmium	Iridium	Platinum	Gold	Mercury (element)	Thallium	Lead	Bismuth	Polonium	Astatine	Radon
Francium	Radium	Actinium	Thorium	Protactinium	Uranium	Neptunium	Plutonium	Americium	Curium	Berkelium	Californium	Einsteinium	Fermium	Mendelevium	Nobelium	Lawrencium	Rutherfordium	Dubnium	Seaborgium	Bohrium	Hassium	Meitnerium	Darmstadtium	Roentgenium	Copernicium	Nihonium	Flerovium	Moscovium	Livermorium	Tennessine	Oganesson
In
↑
Tl
↓
Nh
mercury ← thallium → lead
- Atomic number (Z): 81
- Group: group 13 (boron group)
- Period: period 6
- Block: p-block
- Electron configuration: [Xe] 4f^{14} 5d^{10} 6s^{2} 6p^{1}
- Electrons per shell: 2, 8, 18, 32, 18, 3

Physical properties
- Phase at STP: solid
- Melting point: 577 K (304 °C, 579 °F)
- Boiling point: 1746 K (1473 °C, 2683 °F)
- Density (at 20° C): 11.873 g/cm^{3}
- when liquid (at m.p.): 11.22 g/cm^{3}
- Heat of fusion: 4.14 kJ/mol
- Heat of vaporization: 165 kJ/mol
- Molar heat capacity: 26.32 J/(mol·K)
- Specific heat capacity: 128.78 J/(kg·K)
Vapor pressure
P (Pa)	1	10	100	1 k	10 k	100 k
at T (K)	882	977	1097	1252	1461	1758

Atomic properties
- Oxidation states: common: +1, +3 −5, −2, −1, +2
- Electronegativity: Pauling scale: 1.62
- Ionization energies: 1st: 589.4 kJ/mol; 2nd: 1971 kJ/mol; 3rd: 2878 kJ/mol
- Atomic radius: empirical: 170 pm
- Covalent radius: 145±7 pm
- Van der Waals radius: 196 pm
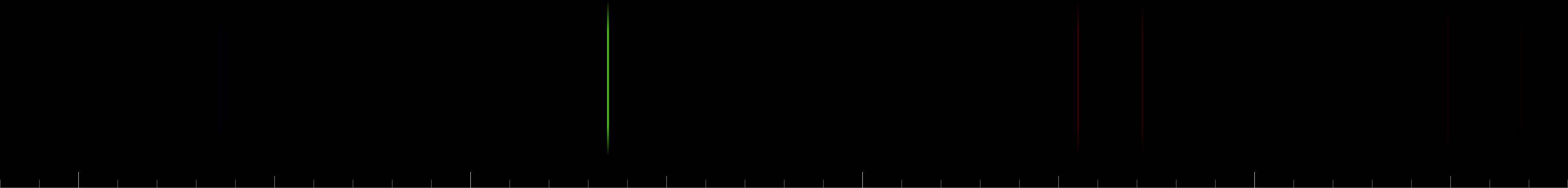
- Spectral lines of thallium

Other properties
- Natural occurrence: primordial
- Crystal structure: hexagonal close-packed (hcp) (hP2)
- Lattice constants: a = 345.66 pm c = 552.52 pm (at 20 °C)
- Thermal expansion: 29.9 µm/(m⋅K) (at 25 °C)
- Thermal conductivity: 46.1 W/(m⋅K)
- Electrical resistivity: 0.18 µΩ⋅m (at 20 °C)
- Magnetic ordering: diamagnetic
- Molar magnetic susceptibility: −50.9×10^{−6} cm^{3}/mol (298 K)
- Young's modulus: 8 GPa
- Shear modulus: 2.8 GPa
- Bulk modulus: 43 GPa
- Speed of sound thin rod: 818 m/s (at 20 °C)
- Poisson ratio: 0.45
- Mohs hardness: 1.2
- Brinell hardness: 26.5–44.7 MPa
- CAS Number: 7440-28-0

History
- Naming: after Greek thallos, green shoot or twig
- Discovery: William Crookes (1861)
- First isolation: Claude-Auguste Lamy (1862)

Isotopes of thallium
Main isotopes			Decay	
Isotope	abundance	half-life (t_{1/2})	mode	product
^{201}Tl	synth	3.0421 d	ε	^{201}Hg
^{202}Tl	synth	12.31 d	β^{+}	^{202}Hg
^{203}Tl	29.5%	stable		
^{204}Tl	synth	3.78 y	β^{−}	^{204}Pb
^{204}Tl	synth	3.78 y	ε	^{204}Hg
^{205}Tl	70.5%	stable		

Thallium is a chemical element; it has symbol Tl and atomic number 81. It is a silvery-white post-transition metal that is not found free in nature. When isolated, thallium resembles tin, but discolors when exposed to air. Chemists William Crookes and Claude-Auguste Lamy discovered thallium independently in 1861, in residues of sulfuric acid production. Both used the newly developed method of flame spectroscopy, in which thallium produces a notable green spectral line. Thallium, from Greek θαλλός, thallós, meaning "green shoot" or "twig", was named by Crookes. It was isolated by both Lamy and Crookes in 1862, Lamy by electrolysis and Crookes by precipitation and melting of the resultant powder. Crookes exhibited it as a powder precipitated by zinc at the International Exhibition, which opened on 1 May that year.

Thallium tends to form the +3 and +1 oxidation states. The +3 state resembles that of the other elements in group 13 (boron, aluminium, gallium, indium). However, the +1 state, which is far more prominent in thallium than the elements above it in the periodic table, recalls the chemistry of alkali metals. Thallium(I) ions are found geologically mostly in potassium-based ores and (when ingested) are handled in many ways like potassium ions (K^{+}) by ion pumps in living cells.

Commercially, thallium is produced not from potassium ores, but as a byproduct from refining of heavy-metal sulfide ores. Approximately 65% of thallium production is used in the electronics industry and the remainder is used in the pharmaceutical industry and in glass manufacturing. It is also used in infrared detectors. The radioisotope thallium-201 (as the soluble chloride TlCl) is used in small amounts as an agent in a nuclear medicine scan, during one type of nuclear cardiac stress test.

Soluble thallium salts (many of which are nearly tasteless) are highly toxic and they were historically used in rat poisons and insecticides. Because of their nonselective toxicity, use of these compounds has been restricted or banned in many countries. Thallium poisoning usually results in hair loss. Because of its historic popularity as a murder weapon, thallium has gained notoriety as "the poisoner's poison" and "inheritance powder" (alongside arsenic).

== Characteristics ==
A thallium atom has 81 electrons, arranged in the electron configuration [Xe]4f^{14}5d^{10}6s^{2}6p^{1}; of these, the three outermost electrons in the sixth shell are valence electrons. Due to the inert pair effect, the 6s electron pair is relativistically stabilised and it is more difficult to get these involved in chemical bonding than it is for the heavier elements. Thus, very few electrons are available for metallic bonding, similar to the neighboring elements mercury and lead. Thallium, then, like its congeners, is a soft, highly electrically conducting metal with a low melting point, of 304 °C.

Thallium is malleable and sectile enough to be cut with a knife at room temperature. It has a metallic luster that, when exposed to air, quickly tarnishes to a bluish-gray tinge, resembling lead. It may be preserved by immersion in oil. A heavy layer of oxide builds up on thallium if left in air. The metal also reacts with water, forming thallium hydroxide. Sulfuric, nitric, and hydrofluoric acid dissolve thallium rapidly to make the corresponding thallium(I) salts, but the other hydrohalic acids form a passivating layer of thallium(I) halide.

A number of standard electrode potentials, depending on the reaction under study, are reported for thallium, reflecting the greatly decreased stability of the +3 oxidation state:

Tl^{3+} + 3e^{−} ⇌ Tl +0.73 V
Tl^{+} + e^{−} ⇌ Tl -0.336 V

Thallium is the first element in group 13 where the reduction of the +3 oxidation state to the +1 oxidation state is spontaneous under standard conditions. Since bond energies decrease down the group, with thallium, the energy released in forming two additional bonds and attaining the +3 state is not always enough to outweigh the energy needed to involve the 6s-electrons.

Thallium(I) oxide and hydroxide are more basic and thallium(III) oxide and hydroxide are more acidic, showing that thallium conforms to the general rule of elements being more electropositive in their lower oxidation states.

=== Isotopes ===
Thallium has 41 known isotopes with atomic masses from 176 to 216. ^{203}Tl and ^{205}Tl are the only stable isotopes and make up all natural thallium. The five short-lived isotopes ^{206}Tl through ^{210}Tl inclusive occur in nature, but only as part of the natural decay chains of heavier elements. ^{204}Tl is the most stable radioisotope, with a half-life of 3.78 years; the next most stable are ^{202}Tl (half-life 12.31 days) and ^{201}Tl (half-life 3.0421 days). It is made by the neutron activation of stable thallium in a nuclear reactor.

The isotope ^{201}Tl is useful in nuclear medicine; it decays by electron capture, emitting X-rays (~70–80 keV), and gamma rays of 135 and 167 keV; therefore, it has good imaging characteristics without an excessive patient-radiation dose. It is the most popular isotope used for thallium nuclear cardiac stress tests.

== Compounds ==
=== Thallium(III) ===
Thallium(III) compounds resemble the corresponding aluminium(III) compounds. They are moderately strong oxidizing agents and are usually unstable, as illustrated by the positive reduction potential for the Tl^{3+}/Tl couple. Some mixed-valence compounds are also known, such as Tl_{4}O_{3} and TlCl_{2}, which contain both thallium(I) and thallium(III).

The simplest possible thallium compound, thallane (TlH_{3}), is too unstable to exist in bulk, both due to the instability of the +3 oxidation state as well as poor overlap of the valence 6s and 6p orbitals of thallium with the 1s orbital of hydrogen. The trihalides are more stable, although they are chemically distinct from those of the lighter group 13 elements and are still the least stable in the whole group. For instance, thallium(III) fluoride, TlF_{3}, but not the lighter group 13 trifluorides, has the β−BiF_{3} structure and does not form the TlF_{4}^{−} complex anion in aqueous solution. The trichloride and tribromide disproportionate just above room temperature to give the monohalides. Thallium triiodide is actually a thallium(I) compound with the linear triiodide anion (I^{−}_{3}) in neutral solution, but forms a stable [TlI_{4}]^{−} anion; similar behavior occurs for the common pseudohalides.

Thallium(III) oxide, Tl_{2}O_{3}, is a black solid which decomposes above 800 °C, forming the thallium(I) oxide and oxygen. The material is amphoteric, and forms a number of ternary (complex) oxides. Heavier thallium(III) sesquichalcogenides do not exist. As thallic ion is relatively oxidizing, oxyacid salts are generally with the most oxidized form of the central atom: thus a phosphate, a nitrate, a sulfate, and many carboxylates. All are moisture-sensitive. The carboxylates are much stronger electrophiles than the trihalides.

Thallium(III) complexes are generally tetrahedral or octacoordinate pseudotetrahedral.

Certain electropositive and coordinating anions prefer the thallic state. Thus thallous tetracarbonylcobaltate can only be made through carbonylating a mixture of the metals; Tl^{+} ions react with NaCo(CO)_{4} to give Tl[Co(CO)_{4}]_{3} instead. Similar behavior occurs with Mn(CO)^{−}_{5}, GaH^{−}_{4}, and BH^{−}_{4}; and is the rule in organothallium chemistry.

=== Thallium(I) ===
Thallium(I) chemistry is quite different than the rest of the boron group and somewhat resembles that of the alkali metals. It forms salts with virtually all the classical anions of inorganic chemistry, both monatoamic and polyatomic. Thallium halide and pseudohalide salts generally have little covalent character, with thallous cyanamide being a notable exception. However, bonds between thallium and the rest of the main group are considerably more covalent than their alkali analogues.

The simplest salts are the thallium monohalides. In keeping with the large size of the Tl^{+} cation, the chloride and bromide have the caesium chloride structure, while the fluoride and iodide have distorted sodium chloride structures. Like the analogous silver compounds, TlCl, TlBr, and TlI are photosensitive and display poor solubility in water.

A stable oxide and hydroxide are known, as are many chalcogenides. The metalorganic compound thallium ethoxide (TlOEt, TlOC_{2}H_{5}) is a heavy liquid (ρ 3.49 g·cm^{−3}, m.p. −3 °C), often used as a basic and soluble thallium source in organic and organometallic chemistry. It and the other alkoxides are however somewhat unstable at room temperature.

Thallium(I) forms ternary oxides and sulfides with most elements. Thallous sulfate and nitrate are known, as are salts of virtually all the lower nitrogenous and sulfurous anions. Complex salts with transition metal ions sometimes exhibit electrical conductivity or spectral shifts from perturbative oxidation to Tl^{2+}.

Thallous nitride is formed by metathesis between thallium nitrate and potassamide:

3TlNO_{3} + 3KNH_{2} → Tl_{3}N + 3KNO_{3} + 2NH_{3}

The product reacts explosively with water. In dry conditions, it can be used to substitute Tl for H on e.g. amides and imides. Absent an additional Lewis base functionality, these salts are generally subsceptible to hydrolysis.

Within the adamantogens, thallium(I) forms a carbonate and a bicarbonate. The double salt Tl_{4}(OH)_{2}CO_{3} has been shown to have hydroxyl-centred triangles of thallium, [Tl_{3}(OH)]^{2+}, as a recurring motif throughout its solid structure. Carboxylic acids react with thallous hydroxide to form thallium salts (thallium soaps), but reducing sugars generally deposit thallium metal.

=== Organothallium compounds ===
Organothallium compounds tend to be thermally unstable, in concordance with the trend of decreasing thermal stability down group 13. The chemical reactivity of the Tl–C bond is also the lowest in the group, especially for ionic compounds of the type R_{2}TlX. Thallium forms the stable [Tl(CH_{3})_{2}]^{+} ion in aqueous solution; like the isoelectronic Hg(CH_{3})_{2} and [Pb(CH_{3})_{2}]^{2+}, it is linear. Trimethylthallium and triethylthallium are, like the corresponding gallium and indium compounds, flammable liquids with low melting points. Like indium, thallium cyclopentadienyl compounds contain thallium(I), in contrast to gallium(III).

=== Exotica ===
Tl(+2) has been observed in tetrakis(hypersilyl)dithallium ([(Me_{3}Si)Si]_{2}Tl—Tl[Si(SiMe_{3})]_{2}), produced from hypersilylrubidium and thallium hexamethyldisilazane in toluene at low temperature. Using thallous halides instead of the amide gives disproportionated products. The analogous supersilyl compound is believed to dissociate to Tl(II) radicals at room temperature.

== History ==
Thallium (Greek θαλλός, thallos, meaning "a green shoot or twig") was discovered by William Crookes and Claude Auguste Lamy, working independently, both using flame spectroscopy (Crookes was first to publish his findings, on March 30, 1861). The name comes from thallium's bright green spectral emission lines.

After the publication of the improved method of flame spectroscopy by Robert Bunsen and Gustav Kirchhoff and the discovery of caesium and rubidium in the years 1859 to 1860, flame spectroscopy became an approved method to determine the composition of minerals and chemical products. Crookes and Lamy both started to use the new method. Crookes used it to make spectroscopic determinations for tellurium on selenium compounds deposited in the lead chamber of a sulfuric acid production plant near Tilkerode in the Harz mountains. He had obtained the samples for his research on selenium cyanide from August Hofmann years earlier. By 1862, Crookes was able to isolate small quantities of the new element and determine the properties of a few compounds. Claude-Auguste Lamy used a spectrometer that was similar to Crookes' to determine the composition of a selenium-containing substance which was deposited during the production of sulfuric acid from pyrite. He also noticed the new green line in the spectra and concluded that a new element was present. Lamy had received this material from the sulfuric acid plant of his friend Frédéric Kuhlmann and this by-product was available in large quantities. Lamy started to isolate the new element from that source. The fact that Lamy was able to work ample quantities of thallium enabled him to determine the properties of several compounds and in addition he prepared a small ingot of metallic thallium which he prepared by remelting thallium he had obtained by electrolysis of thallium salts.

As both scientists discovered thallium independently and a large part of the work, especially the isolation of the metallic thallium was done by Lamy, Crookes tried to secure his own priority on the work. Lamy was awarded a medal at the International Exhibition in London 1862: For the discovery of a new and abundant source of thallium and after heavy protest Crookes also received a medal: thallium, for the discovery of the new element. The controversy between both scientists continued through 1862 and 1863. Most of the discussion ended after Crookes was elected Fellow of the Royal Society in June 1863.

The dominant use of thallium was the use as poison for rodents. After several accidents the use as poison was banned in the United States by Presidential Executive Order 11643 in February 1972. In subsequent years several other countries also banned its use.

== Occurrence and production ==
Thallium concentration in the Earth's crust is estimated to be 0.7 mg/kg, mostly in association with potassium-based minerals in clays, soils, and granites. Thallium is roughly 100–300 times less abundant on the Moon than on Earth; this is ascribed to (geologically) low-temperature vaporization during the time of the Moon's formation.

The United States Geological Survey (USGS) estimated in 2010 that the annual worldwide production of thallium was about 10 metric tonnes, entirely the coproduct of other elements' refinery. Production is rather elastic: deposits and ores with relatively high thallium content allow production to scale with demand. From 1995 to 2009, production decreased by about 33% (i.e., from about 15 metric tonnes).

The major practical sources of thallium are the trace amounts found in copper, lead, zinc, and other sulfosalt-type ores, including iron pyrite. Thallium is generally extracted from the flue dust produced when these minerals are roasted to produce sulfuric acid, and also from the smelting slag. It is separated through selective precipitation in aqueous acid and then electrolyzed to the free metal.

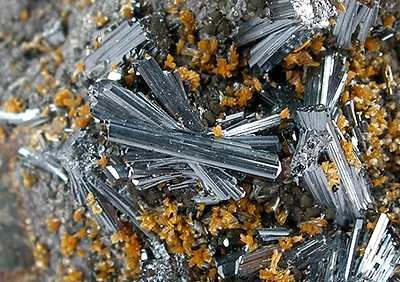
Crystals of hutchinsonite ((Tl,Pb)_{2}As_{5}S_{9})

Thallium is found concentrated in various antimony, arsenic, copper, lead, and silver minerals, but none have any commercial importance for their thallium content. They include crookesite TlCu_{7}Se_{4}, hutchinsonite TlPbAs_{5}S_{9}, and lorándite TlAsSs. Manganese nodules found on the ocean floor also contain some thallium.

The Allchar deposit in southern North Macedonia was the only area where thallium was actively mined, with most production between 1888 and 1908. The deposit still contains an estimated 500 tonnes of thallium, and it is a source for several rare thallium minerals, for example lorándite.

== Applications ==
=== Historic uses ===
The odorless and tasteless thallium sulfate was once widely used as rat poison and ant killer. Since 1972 this use has been prohibited in the United States due to safety concerns. Many other countries followed this example. Thallium salts were used in the treatment of ringworm, other skin infections and to reduce the night sweating of tuberculosis patients. This use has been limited due to their narrow therapeutic index, and the development of improved medicines for these conditions.

=== Optics ===
Thallium(I) bromide and thallium(I) iodide crystals have been used as infrared optical materials, because they are harder than other common infrared optics, and because they have transmission at significantly longer wavelengths. The trade name KRS-5 refers to this material. Thallium(I) oxide has been used to manufacture glasses that have a high index of refraction. Combined with sulfur or selenium and arsenic, thallium has been used in the production of high-density glasses that have low melting points in the range of 125 and 150 Celsius°. These glasses have room-temperature properties that are similar to ordinary glasses and are durable, insoluble in water and have unique refractive indices.

Alkali halide solutions doped with thallium are blue phosphors in some scintillation radiation detectors.

=== Electronics ===
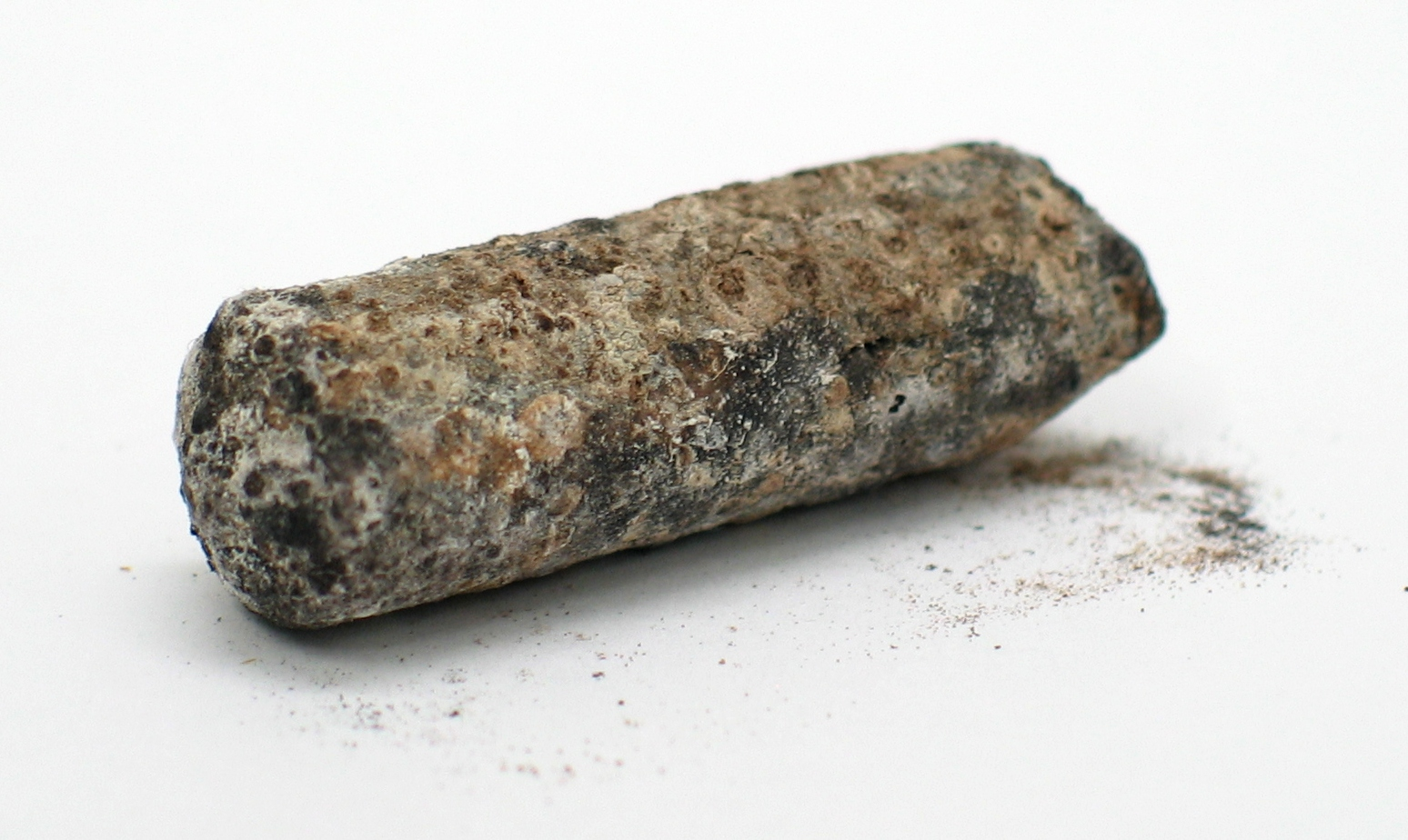
A corroded thallium rod

Thallium(I) sulfide's electrical conductivity changes with exposure to infrared light, making this compound useful in photoresistors. Thallium selenide has been used in bolometers for infrared detection. Doping selenium semiconductors with thallium improves their performance, thus it is used in trace amounts in selenium rectifiers. Another application of thallium doping is the sodium iodide and cesium iodide crystals in gamma radiation detection devices. In these, the sodium iodide crystals are doped with a small amount of thallium to improve their efficiency as scintillation generators. Some of the electrodes in dissolved oxygen analyzers contain thallium.

=== High-temperature superconductivity ===
Research activity with thallium is ongoing to develop high-temperature superconductors for such applications as magnetic resonance imaging, storage of magnetic energy, magnetic propulsion, and electric power generation and transmission. The research in applications started after the discovery of the first thallium barium calcium copper oxide superconductor in 1988. Thallium cuprate superconductors have been discovered that have transition temperatures above 120 K. Some mercury-doped thallium-cuprate superconductors have transition temperatures above 130 K at ambient pressure, nearly as high as the world-record-holding mercury cuprates.

=== Nuclear medicine ===
Before the widespread application of technetium-99m in nuclear medicine, the radioactive isotope thallium-201, with a half-life of 73 hours, was the main substance for nuclear cardiography. The nuclide is still used for stress tests for risk stratification in patients with coronary artery disease (CAD). This isotope of thallium can be generated using a transportable generator, which is similar to the technetium-99m generator. The generator contains lead-201 (half-life 9.33 hours), which decays by electron capture to thallium-201. The lead-201 can be produced in a cyclotron by the bombardment of thallium with protons or deuterons by the (p,3n) and (d,4n) reactions.

==== Thallium stress test ====
A thallium stress test is a form of scintigraphy in which the amount of thallium in tissues correlates with tissue blood supply. Viable cardiac cells have normal Na^{+}/K^{+} ion-exchange pumps. The Tl^{+} cation binds the K^{+} pumps and is transported into the cells. Exercise or dipyridamole induces widening (vasodilation) of arteries in the body. This produces coronary steal by areas where arteries are maximally dilated. Areas of infarct or ischemic tissue will remain "cold". Pre- and post-stress thallium may indicate areas that will benefit from myocardial revascularization. Redistribution indicates the existence of coronary steal and the presence of ischemic coronary artery disease.

=== Other uses ===
A mercury–thallium alloy, which forms a eutectic at 8.5% thallium, is reported to freeze at −60 °C, some 20 °C below the freezing point of mercury. This alloy is used in thermometers and low-temperature switches. In organic synthesis, thallium(III) salts, as thallium trinitrate or triacetate, are useful reagents for performing different transformations in aromatics, ketones and olefins, among others. Thallium is a constituent of the alloy in the anode plates of magnesium seawater batteries. Soluble thallium salts are added to gold plating baths to increase the speed of plating and to reduce grain size within the gold layer.

A saturated solution of equal parts of thallium(I) formate (TlHCO_{2}) and thallium(I) malonate (TlC_{3}H_{3}O_{4}) in water is known as Clerici solution. It is a mobile, odorless liquid which changes from yellowish to colorless upon reducing the concentration of the thallium salts. With a density of 4.25 g/cm^{3} at 20 °C, Clerici solution is one of the heaviest aqueous solutions known. It was used in the 20th century for measuring the density of minerals by the flotation method, but its use has discontinued due to the high toxicity and corrosiveness of the solution.

Thallium iodide is frequently used as an additive in metal-halide lamps, often together with one or two halides of other metals. It allows optimization of the lamp temperature and color rendering, and shifts the spectral output to the green region, which is useful for underwater lighting.

== Toxicity ==
Thallium
Hazards
- GHS labelling
Pictograms	(GHS06: Toxic) (GHS08: Health hazard) (GHS09: Environmental hazard)
Signal word	Danger
Hazard statements	H300, H330, H373, H413
Precautionary statements	P260, P264, P284, P301, P310
NFPA 704 (fire diamond)	4 0 2

Thallium and its compounds are extremely toxic, with numerous recorded cases of fatal thallium poisoning. The Occupational Safety and Health Administration (OSHA) has set the legal limit (permissible exposure limit) for thallium exposure in the workplace as 0.1 mg/m^{3} skin exposure over an eight-hour workday. The National Institute for Occupational Safety and Health (NIOSH) also set a recommended exposure limit (REL) of 0.1 mg/m^{3} skin exposure over an eight-hour workday. At levels of 15 mg/m^{3}, thallium is immediately dangerous to life and health.

Contact with skin is dangerous, and adequate ventilation is necessary when melting this metal. Thallium(I) compounds have a high aqueous solubility and are readily absorbed through the skin, and care should be taken to avoid this route of exposure, as cutaneous absorption can exceed the absorbed dose received by inhalation at the permissible exposure limit (PEL). Exposure by inhalation cannot safely exceed 0.1 mg/m^{3} in an eight-hour time-weighted average (40-hour work week). The Centers for Disease Control and Prevention (CDC) states, "Thallium is not classifiable as a carcinogen, and it is not suspected to be a carcinogen. It is unknown whether chronic or repeated exposure to thallium increases the risk of reproductive toxicity or developmental toxicity. Chronic high level exposure to thallium through inhalation has been reported to cause nervous system effects, such as numbness of fingers and toes." For a long time, thallium compounds were readily available as rat poison. This, and that it is water-soluble and nearly tasteless, led to frequent intoxication caused by accident or criminal intent.

One of the main methods of removing thallium, both radioactive and stable, from humans is to use Prussian blue, a material which absorbs thallium. Up to 20 grams per day of Prussian blue is fed by mouth to the patient, and it passes through the patient's digestive system and comes out in the patient's stool. Hemodialysis and hemoperfusion are also used to remove thallium from the blood serum. At later stages of the treatment, additional potassium is used to mobilize thallium from the tissues.

According to the United States Environmental Protection Agency (EPA), artificially-made sources of thallium pollution include gaseous emission of cement factories, coal-burning power plants, and metal sewers. The main source of elevated thallium concentrations in water is the leaching of thallium from ore processing operations.

== See also ==
- Myocardial perfusion imaging

== General bibliography ==
- Greenwood, Norman N.; Earnshaw, Alan (1997). Chemistry of the Elements (2nd ed.). Butterworth-Heinemann. doi:10.1016/C2009-0-30414-6. ISBN 978-0-08-037941-8.
