= Terbium(III) perchlorate =

- Tb(H_{2}O)_{6}(ClO_{4})_{3}

Identifiers
CAS Number	anhydrous: 14014-09-6; hexahydrate: 80398-56-7
3D model (JSmol)	anhydrous: Interactive image; hexahydrate: Interactive image
ChemSpider	anhydrous: 14653481; hexahydrate: 2341282
EC Number	anhydrous: 237-826-8
PubChem CID	hexahydrate: 3084176
- InChI: hexahydrate: InChI=1S/3ClHO4.6H2O.Tb/c3*2-1(3,4)5;;;;;;;/h3*(H,2,3,4,5);6*1H2;/q;;;;;;;;;+3/p-3 Key: NAPXFYQZNZUQDE-UHFFFAOYSA-K
- SMILES: anhydrous: [O-]Cl(=O)(=O)=O.[O-]Cl(=O)(=O)=O.[O-]Cl(=O)(=O)=O.[Tb+3]; hexahydrate: O.O.O.O.O.O.[O-]Cl(=O)(=O)=O.[O-]Cl(=O)(=O)=O.[O-]Cl(=O)(=O)=O.[Tb+3]

Properties
Chemical formula	Cl_{3}O_{12}Tb
Molar mass	457.26 g·mol^{−1}
Appearance	light pink crystals (hexahydrate)
Density	2.21 g/cm^{3} (hexahydrate)
Solubility in water	soluble (anhydrous, hexahydrate)

Hazards
- GHS labelling
Pictograms	(GHS03: Oxidizing) (GHS07: Exclamation mark)
Signal word	Danger
Hazard statements	H272, H315, H319, H335
Precautionary statements	P210, P220, P261, P264, P264+P265, P271, P280, P302+P352, P304+P340, P305+P351+P338, P319, P321, P332+P317, P337+P317, P362+P364, P370+P378, P403+P233, P405, P501
- Except where otherwise noted, data are given for materials in their standard state (at 25 °C [77 °F], 100 kPa). Infobox references

Terbium(III) perchlorate refers to an inorganic compound having chemical formula Tb(ClO_{4})_{3}(H_{2}O)_{x}. Usually this salt is encountered as its hexahydrate. This terbium(III) compound can be obtained by treating terbium(III,IV) oxide with perchloric acid. The perchlorates are non-coordinating anions, so this substance can be used as a starting material for forming Tb(III) complexes. For example, reaction with alanine forms a complex in which the carboxylate portion of four alanine units bridge between two terbium atoms. It can be used to synthesize terbium-containing metal-organic framework materials.
