= Organogallium chemistry =

Chemistry of organogallium compounds

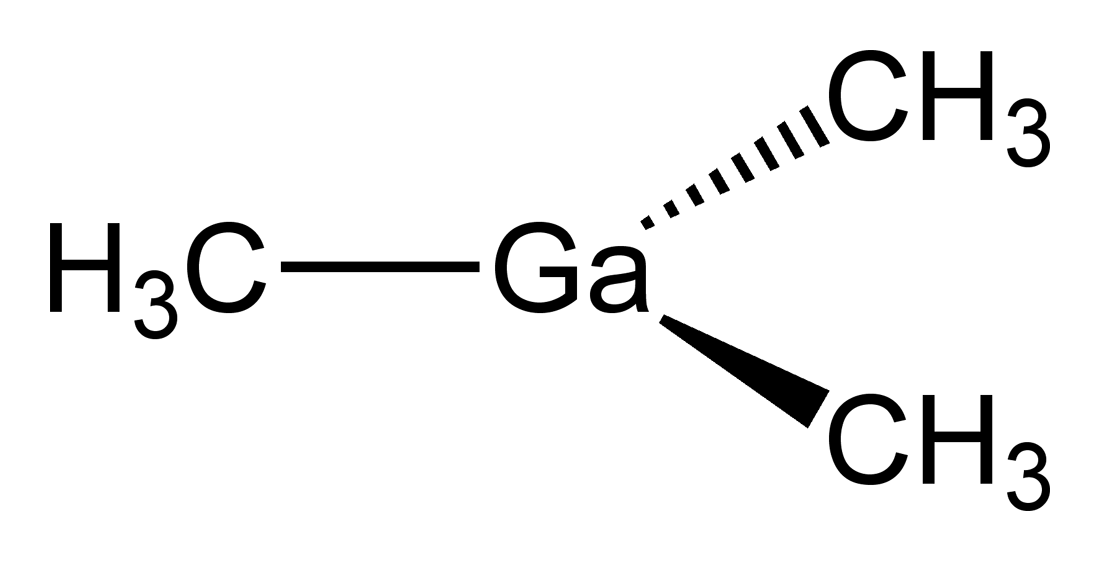
Trimethylgallium

Organogallium chemistry is the chemistry of organometallic compounds containing a carbon to gallium (Ga) chemical bond. Despite their high toxicity, organogallium compounds have some use in organic synthesis. The compound trimethylgallium is of some relevance to MOCVD as a precursor to gallium arsenide via its reaction with arsine at 700 °C:

Ga(CH_{3})_{3} + AsH_{3} → GaAs + 3CH_{4}

Gallium trichloride is an important reagent for the introduction of gallium into organic compounds.

The main gallium oxidation state is Ga(III), as in all lower group 13 elements (such as aluminium).

== Organogallium(I) chemistry ==
Organometallic complexes of gallium(I) are significantly rarer than that of gallium(III). Some common species include arene-gallium(I) complexes and sterically hindered aryl gallium(I) complexes.

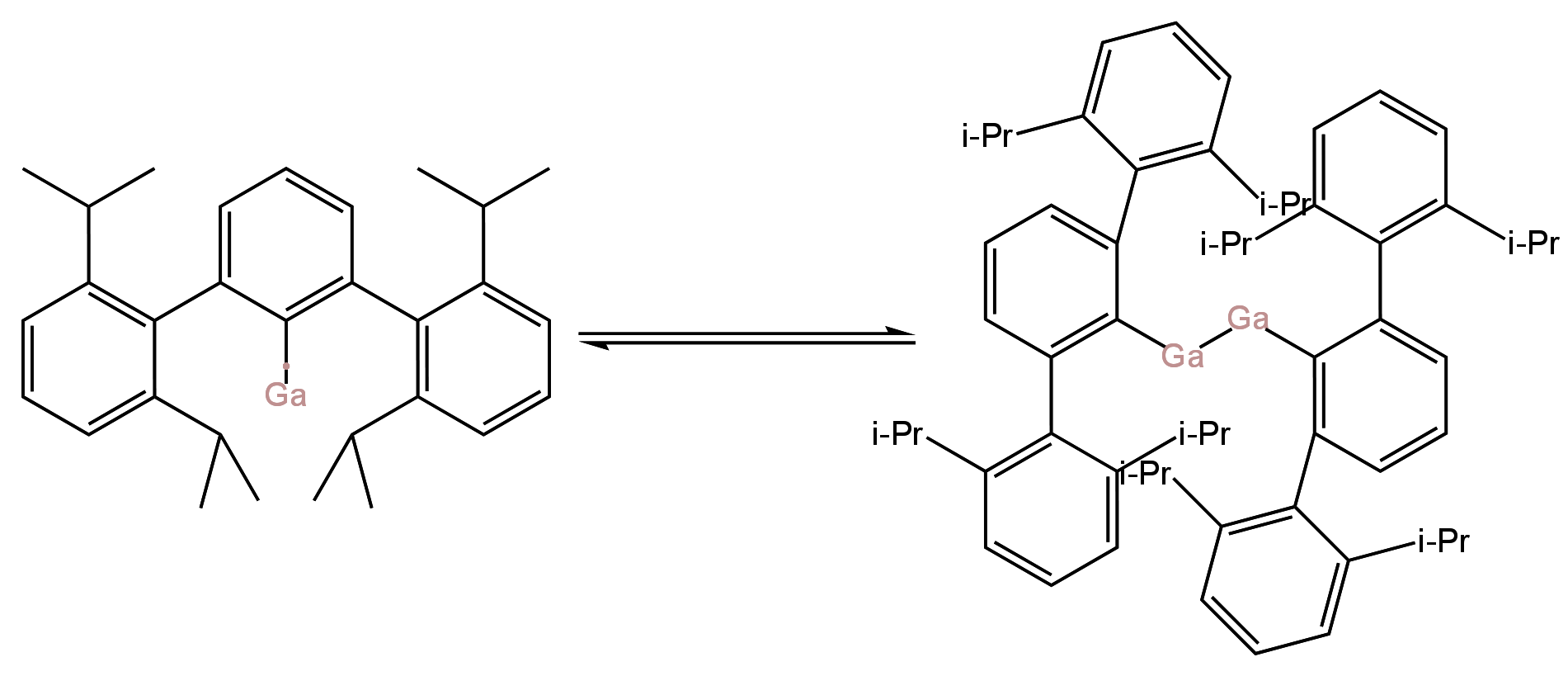
An example of an aryl organogallium(I) compound, note its reversible dimerization

== Organogallium(III) chemistry ==
Compounds of the type R_{3}Ga are monomeric. Lewis acidity decreases in the order Al > Ga > In and as a result organogallium compounds do not form bridged dimers as organoaluminum compounds do. Organogallium compounds are also less reactive than organoaluminum compounds. They do form stable peroxides.

Organogallium compounds can be synthesized by transmetallation, for example the reaction of gallium metal with dimethylmercury:

2Ga + 3Me_{2}Hg → 2Me_{3}Ga + 3 Hg

or via organolithium compounds or Grignards:

GaCl_{3} + 3MeMgBr → Me_{3}Ga + 3MgBrCl

The electron-deficient nature of gallium can be removed by complex formation, for example

Me_{2}GaCl + NH_{3} → [Me_{2}Ga(NH_{3})Cl]^{+}Cl^{−}

Pi complex formation with alkynes is also known.

Organogallium compounds are reagents or intermediates in several classes of organic reactions:

- Barbier-type reactions with elemental gallium, allylic substrates and carbonyl compounds
- Carbometallation (carbogallation) reactions

== See also ==
- Organoindium chemistry
- Organothallium chemistry
