= Barbier (surname) =

Barbier is a French surname. Notable people with the surname include:

- Antoine Alexandre Barbier (1765–1825), French librarian
- Carl Barbier (born 1944), American jurist from Louisiana
- Charles Barbier (1767–1841), French inventor of alternative writing methods
- Charles Barbier de Meynard (1826–1908), French historian and orientalist
- Christophe Barbier (born 1967), French journalist
- Darren Barbier (born 1960), American college football coach
- Edmond Jean François Barbier (1689–1771), French jurisconsult and chronicler of life in 18th-century Paris
- Elisabeth Barbier (1912–1968), French resistance leader
- Émile Barbier (born 1901), Belgian fencer
- Gabriel Barbier-Mueller, Swiss businessman
- George Barbier (illustrator) (1882–1932), French illustrator
- George Barbier (actor) (1864–1945), American actor
- Henri Auguste Barbier (1805–1882), French dramatist and poet
- Hubert Barbier (born 1932), French Roman Catholic archbishop
- Jean-François Barbier (1754–1828), French general
- Joannès Barbier (1854–1909), French photographer in colonial Africa
- Joseph-Émile Barbier (1839–1889), French astronomer and mathematician
- Leonid Barbier (1937–2023), Soviet swimmer
- Louis Barbier (1593–1670), French bishop
- Philippe Barbier (1848–1922), French organic chemist
- Pierre Barbier (born 1997), French racing cyclist
- René Barbier (1891–1966), French fencer
- Rudy Barbier (born 1992), French racing cyclist
- Sal Barbier (born 1969), American skateboarder and footwear designer
