= Barbier =

Barbier may refer to:

- Barbier (surname)
- Barbier (crater), a feature on the Moon
- Barbier reaction, a reaction in organic chemistry
- Barbier's theorem in mathematics
