= TTFA =

TTFA may refer to:

- Thenoyltrifluoroacetone, a chemical compound used pharmacologically as a chelating agent
- Thallium(III) trifluoroacetate
- Trinidad and Tobago Football Association, the governing body of association football in Trinidad and Tobago
