= Cyclopentadienylindium(I) =

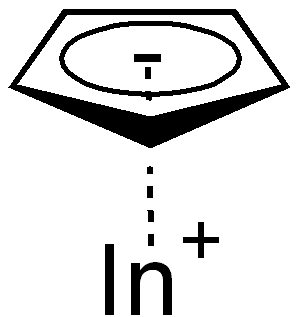

Names
- Other names indium cyclopentadienyl, cyclopentadienyl indium

Identifiers
CAS Number	34822-89-4
3D model (JSmol)	Interactive image
ChemSpider	9270356
ECHA InfoCard	100.222.670
PubChem CID	85397242
- InChI: InChI=1S/C5H5.In/c1-2-4-5-3-1;/h1-5H; Key: JZPXQBRKWFVPAE-UHFFFAOYSA-N
- SMILES: [In+].c1[cH-]ccc1

Properties
Chemical formula	C_{5}H_{5}In
Molar mass	179.913 g/mol
Appearance	off-white solid

Hazards
- GHS labelling
Pictograms	(GHS02: Flammable) (GHS07: Exclamation mark)
Signal word	Warning
Hazard statements	H228, H302, H315, H319, H335
Precautionary statements	P210, P240, P241, P261, P264, P270, P271, P280, P301+P312, P302+P352, P304+P340, P305+P351+P338, P312, P321, P330, P332+P313, P337+P313, P362, P370+P378, P403+P233, P405, P501
- Except where otherwise noted, data are given for materials in their standard state (at 25 °C [77 °F], 100 kPa). Infobox references

Cyclopentadienylindium(I), C_{5}H_{5}In, is an organoindium compound containing indium in the +1 oxidation state. Commonly abbreviated to CpIn, it is a cyclopentadienyl complex with a half-sandwich structure. It was the first (1957) low-valent organoindium compound reported.

== Preparation and chemistry ==
CpIn can be readily prepared by reacting indium(I) chloride with cyclopentadienyllithium:

InCl + CpLi → CpIn + LiCl

InCp reacts with BF_{3}, BCl_{3}, BBr_{3}, BI_{3} and trimethylborane B(CH_{3})_{3} to form adducts, e.g.:

CpIn + BF_{3} → CpIn·BF_{3}

In these adducts the bonding of the Cp ligand to the indium atom changes from η^{5} (π complexing) to η^{1} (σ bonding).

Salts containing the InX_{2}^{−} anion containing indium in the +1 oxidation state have been prepared from cyclopentadieneindium; for example:

CpIn + HCl + N(Et_{4})Cl → N(Et_{4})InCl_{2}+ C_{5}H_{6}

== Structure and bonding ==
Solid CpIn is polymeric consisting of zigzag chains of alternating indium atoms and C_{5}H_{5} units. Two indium atoms interact with the opposite faces of each C_{5}H_{5}^{−} ring, nearly perpendicularly to the ring plane, and two rings interact with each indium atom, forming an angle of about 128°. In the CpIn monomer present in the vapour phase the indium atom sits on the central axis of the aromatic cyclopentadienyl anion, C_{5}H_{5}^{−}.

Bonding studies have shown that the aromatic ring electrons of the cyclopentadienyl anion interact with the indium 5s and 5p atomic orbitals, and that the lone pair on the indium atom is a dominant feature.

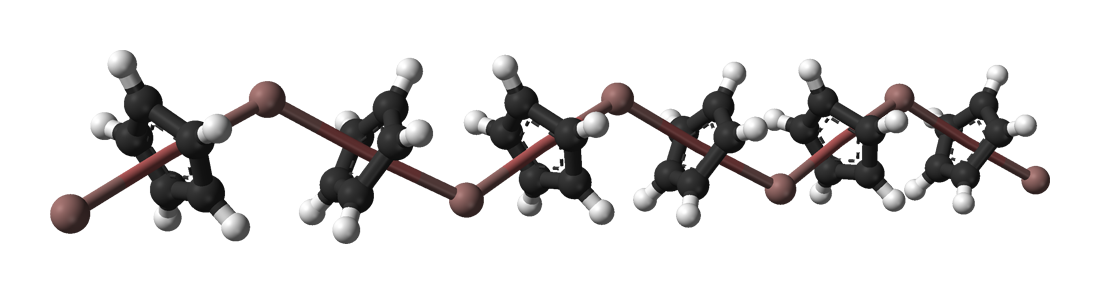
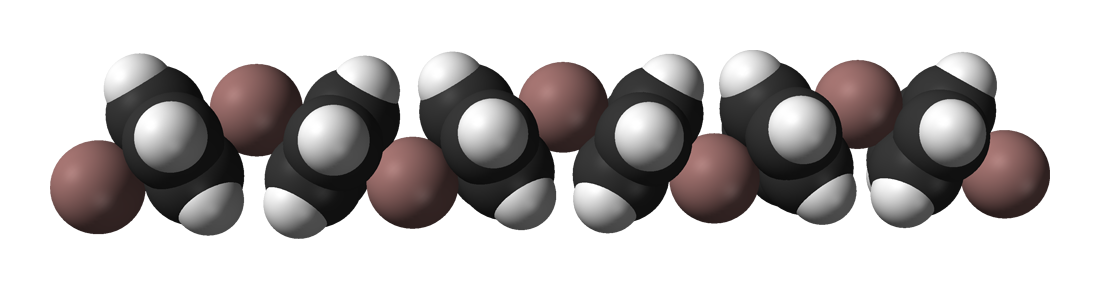
Ball-and-stick and space-filling models of CpIn chains
in the crystal structure of cyclopentadienylindium(I)
