= Thallium(III) trifluoroacetate =

Names
- Other names TTFA

Identifiers
CAS Number	23586-53-0
3D model (JSmol)	Interactive image
ChemSpider	81432
ECHA InfoCard	100.041.586
EC Number	245-761-1
PubChem CID	90200
CompTox Dashboard (EPA)	DTXSID9066912
- InChI: InChI=1S/3C2HF3O2.Tl/c3*3-2(4,5)1(6)7;/h3*(H,6,7);/q;;;+3/p-3 Key: PSHNNUKOUQCMSG-UHFFFAOYSA-K
- SMILES: C(=O)(C(F)(F)F)[O-].C(=O)(C(F)(F)F)[O-].C(=O)(C(F)(F)F)[O-].[Tl+3]

Properties
Chemical formula	C_{6}F_{9}O_{6}Tl
Molar mass	543.43 g·mol^{−1}
Appearance	white solid
Melting point	100 °C (212 °F; 373 K) decomp

Hazards
- GHS labelling
Pictograms	(GHS06: Toxic) (GHS08: Health hazard) (GHS09: Environmental hazard)
Signal word	Danger
Hazard statements	H300, H330, H373, H411
Precautionary statements	P260, P264, P270, P271, P273, P284, P301+P316, P304+P340, P316, P319, P320, P321, P330, P391, P403+P233, P405, P501
- Except where otherwise noted, data are given for materials in their standard state (at 25 °C [77 °F], 100 kPa). Infobox references

Thallium(III) trifluoroacetate (TTFA) is the chemical compound with the formula Tl(O_{2}CCF_{3})_{3}. It is used as a reagent in the synthesis of some organic compounds for research purposes. Thallium is too toxic to be directly useful in medicinal chemistry.

TTFA reacts directly with arenes to afford organothallium(III) derivatives. It is also used to difunctionalize alkenes. For example, alcohol solutions of this reagent convert simple alkenes to glycol derivatives.
