= Organothallium chemistry =

Organometallic compounds of thallium

Organothallium compounds are compounds that contain the carbon-thallium bond. The area is not well developed because of the lack of applications and the high toxicity of thallium. The behavior of organothallium compounds can be inferred from that of organogallium and organoindium compounds. Organothallium(III) compounds are more numerous than organothallium(I) compounds.

== Organothallium(I) chemistry ==
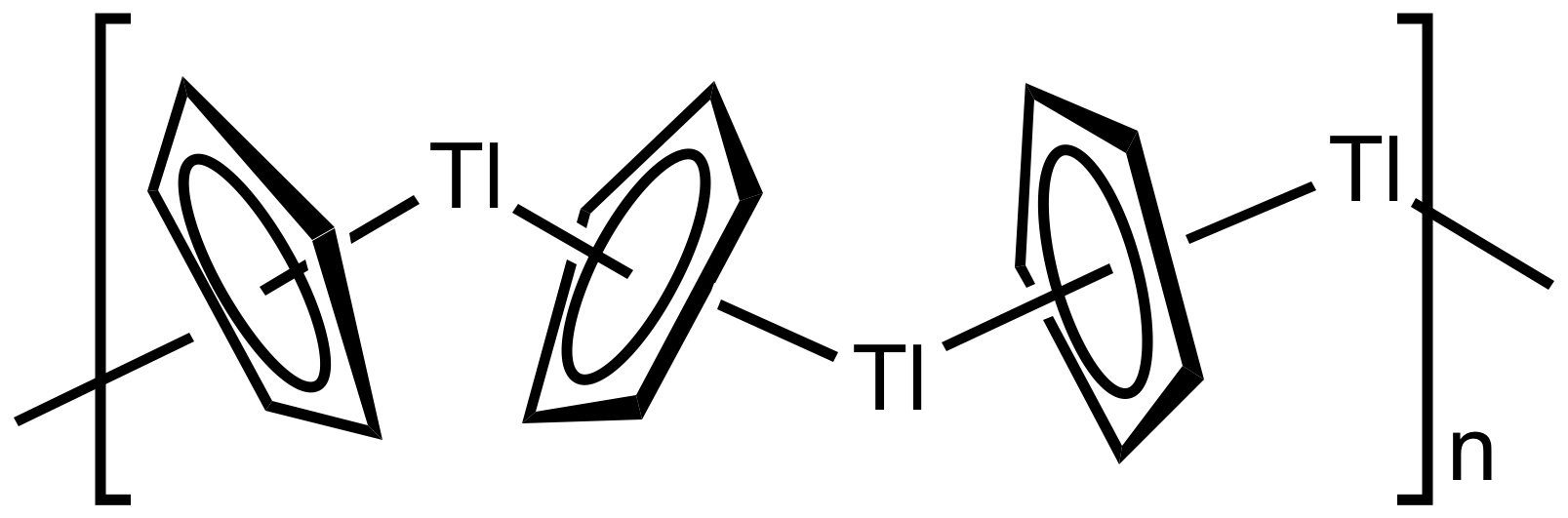
Cyclopentadienylthallium

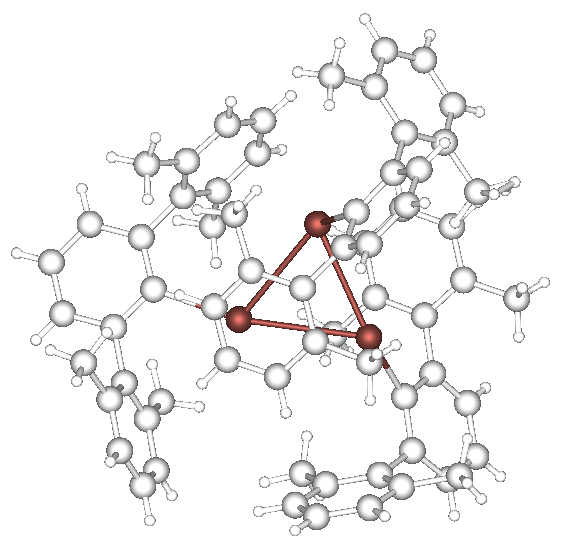
Structure of trimeric (tetraisopropyl-meta‑terphenyl)thallium(I). Color code: magenta= Tl.

Organothallium(I) compounds remain obscure and limited in scope. Attempts to generate the simple compound phenylthallium result in disproportionation, giving thallium(III) derivatives:

3 TlCl + 3 LiPh → TlPh_{3} + 3 LiCl + 2 Tl
2 TlBr + 2 EtMgBr → Et_{2}TlBr + 2 MgBr_{2} + Tl

Bulky tris(trimethylsilyl)methylthallium forms a stable tetramer, and bulky arylthallium(I) compounds also exist. The analogous hypersilyl- and supersilylthallium compounds disproportionate to give rare Tl(II) dimers.

A well-known organothallium(I) species is thallium cyclopentadienide. It arises by treatment of thallium(I) salts, such as thallium sulfate, with cyclopentadiene. Thallium(I) cyclopentadienide adopts a zig-zag chain structure of cyclopentadienide and thallium.

Thallium(I) also forms stable salts with noncoordinating carbanions, e.g. TlC(SO_{3}Me)_{3}.

Uncharged arene complexes are rare; the few known examples resemble arene solvates of non-coordinating anion salts.

== Organothallium(III) chemistry ==
The central features of organothallium(III) chemistry are the stability of dialkylthallium(III) cations and the thallation reaction of thallium(III) salts onto π systems. The latter is the most prominent contribution of organothallium chemistry to organic synthesis:

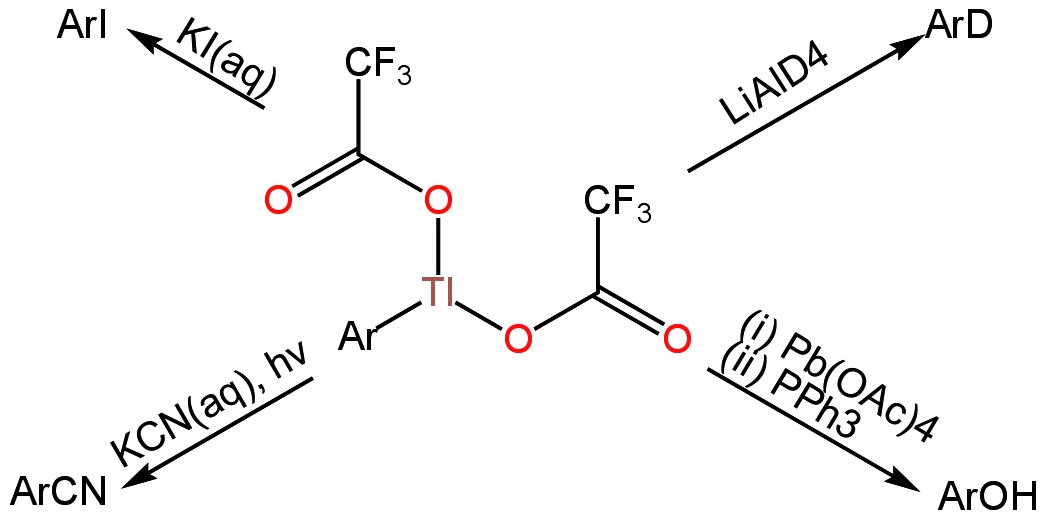

=== Alkyl compounds ===
Linear dialkylthallium(III) cations resemble isoelectronic dialkylmercury compounds and are central to alkylthallium chemistry. They are "among the most stable and least reactive organometallic compounds known," and only weakly Lewis acidic. They transmetalate onto tin(II) or mercury(0).

R_{2}TlX can be prepared from thallium trihalides and many alkyl anion reagents: dialkylmercurials, a Grignard reagent (although with substantial byproducts due to oxidation of the Grignard), organolithium compounds, alkylzincs, or diorganotin dichlorides. Certain aryldiazonium tetrafluoroborate salts oxidize thallium metal to the corresponding diarylthallium(III) and thallium(I) tetrafluoroborates. In all cases, the products are water-soluble salts, mostly stable to air and moisture. They are however insoluble in all but the most basic of organic solvents (i.e., pyridine or ammonia) and presumably form halide-bridged dimers in the gas phase. Other anions displace the halide atom: the hydroxide is strongly basic.

Replacement of the X ligand with a third organyl group is not entirely straightforward. Grignard reagents only react in certain solvents and generally give an ether complex of the product. The cleanest route to, e.g., trimethylthallium combines methyl iodide, methyl lithium, and thallium(I) iodide and is believed to run through a methylthallium(I) intermediate.

Reactions of trialkylthallium compounds evoke a hypothetical "dialkylthallium alkylide" salt: that is, they are predominantly electrophilic attacks on one alkyl ligand. Weak acids protonate one ligand to give a hydrocarbon and a dialkylthallium salt, and trialkylthallium compounds exchange alkyl groups with themselves and some acidic hydrocarbons like alkynes and cyclopentadiene. (Contrariwise, there is no reaction with diethylamine or ammonia.) Even a weak leaving group can induce α elimination: Et_{2}TlCH_{2}NO_{2} decomposes to Et_{2}TlONO and presumably :CH_{2}.

However, trialkylthallium compounds are covalent. In the gas and liquid phase, trialkyl organothallium compounds are monomeric and planar. In the solid phase, there are significant intermolecular interactions between the monomers. Triethylthallium is a liquid, but trimethylthallium is a solid due to monomer association.

Cleaving the second and third Tl−C bonds requires reagents at least as powerful as the elemental halogens. The order of stability is Me_{2}Tl^{+} < Et_{2}Tl^{+} < Pr_{2}Tl^{+} < TolTlPh^{+} < Ph_{2}Tl^{+}, for unclear reasons.

Some trialkyl thallium compounds are photosensitive.

Monoalkylthallium(III) compounds are quite rare. Most known are alkyl diacetates, produced when mercuric acetate abstracts an alkyl group from the corresponding dialkylthallium salt. Some alkylthallium dichlorides can be produced through transmetalation from the corresponding chromium(III) complex. Neopentylthallium(III) dibromide is metastable, slowly decomposing via S_{N}2 attack to neopentyl bromide and thallous bromide.

=== Unsaturated compounds ===
In principle, arylthallium compounds can be produced through the same techniques as alkyl compounds. For example, diphenylmercury reacts with thallium(III) carboxylates to give the corresponding phenylthallium compounds. However, such carbanion-like organometals are not required.

Thallium(III) carboxylates deliver arylthallium(III) derivatives from unsubstituted arenes, acting as more potent electrophiles than the corresponding reaction with Hg(II):

ArH + Tl(O_{2}CCF_{3})_{3} → ArTl(O_{2}CCF_{3})_{2} + HO_{2}CCF_{3}

Arylthallium compounds can also be prepared directly from TlCl_{3} through transmetalation (ipso substitution) on a boronic acid. Excess boronic acid will result in diarylthallium chloride formation.

Phenylthallium dihalides are Lewis acidic in nature, and tend to eliminate the corresponding halobenzene. They grow less stable from down the period, and the diiodide is unknown. Nucleophiles can displace the halide atom, and disproportionation to thallium(III) halides and diphenylthallium halides is also possible. The dichloride transmetallates onto mercuric chloride.

In diphenylthallium salts, thallium directs electrophilic substitution to the meta position.

As pentafluorophenyl rings are much less susceptible to electrophilic substitution and more susceptible to nucleophilic aromatic substitution, (C_{5}F_{6})_{2}TlBr is usually prepared from the corresponding Grignard reagent. The compound is both less stable and more oxidizing than its hydrocarbon analogue. It arylates low-valent, coordinatively unsaturated atoms (e.g. Sn in SnCl_{2}, Pt in Pt(PPh_{3})_{4}, elemental S or I), reducing itself to thallium(I) bromide.

Vinylthallium compounds were relatively unstudied as of 1971, but appear to resemble arylthalliums.

== Oxythallation ==
In oxythallation, thallic acetate or similar thallic carboxylates attack an aliphatic alkene or cyclopropane "in a hydroxylic solvent". The process resembles oxymercuration, insofar as a three-membered thallonium ring is believed to form, before collapsing to a vicinal diacetoxythallium alkyl ether (chemistry). Reduction then removes the resulting diacetoxythallyl functional group.

Unlike oxymercuration, the initial addition to the alkene is irreversible. Diacetoxythallyl is a good leaving group and eliminates when heated to give the corresponding carbocation; the net reaction is thus an organic oxidation. It can convert alkenes to enol ethers, although formation of a vicinal diacetoxy diester or a methyldioxolanium ion have also been observed.

Thallic ions efficiently catalyze alkyne hydration.

== History ==
The first organothallium compound, diethylthallium chloride, was prepared in 1870, shortly after the discovery of the element thallium.

== See also ==
- Organogallium chemistry
- Organoindium chemistry
- Thallium
- Organometallic chemistry
