= Cyclopentadienylthallium =

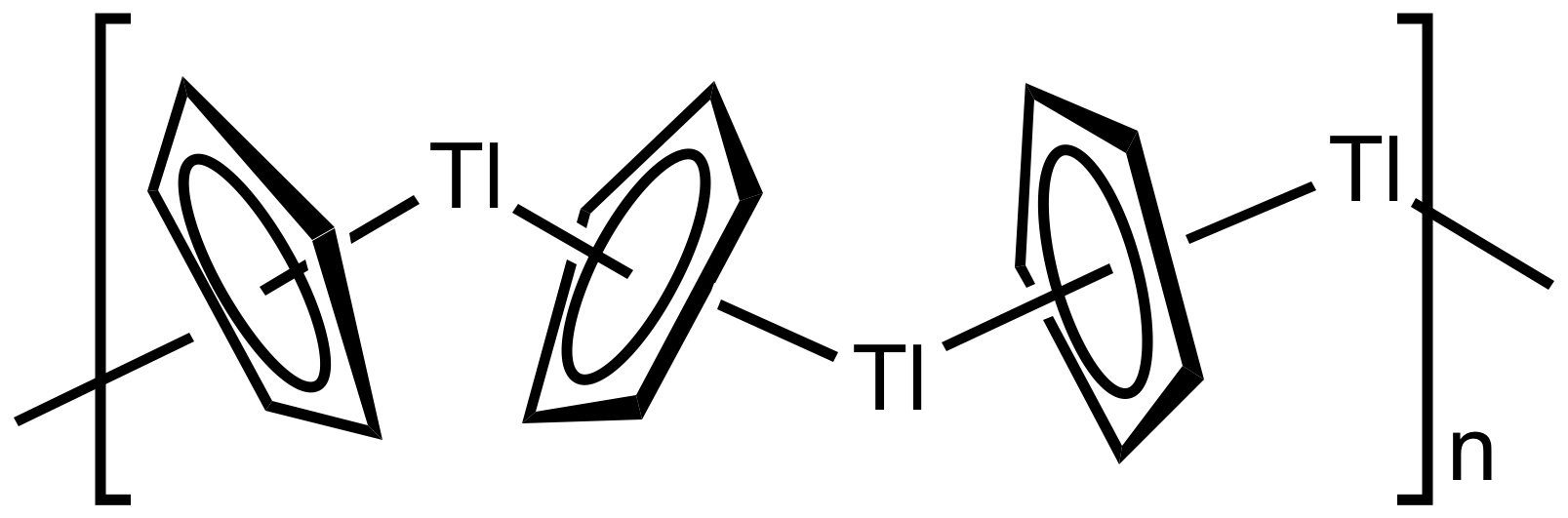

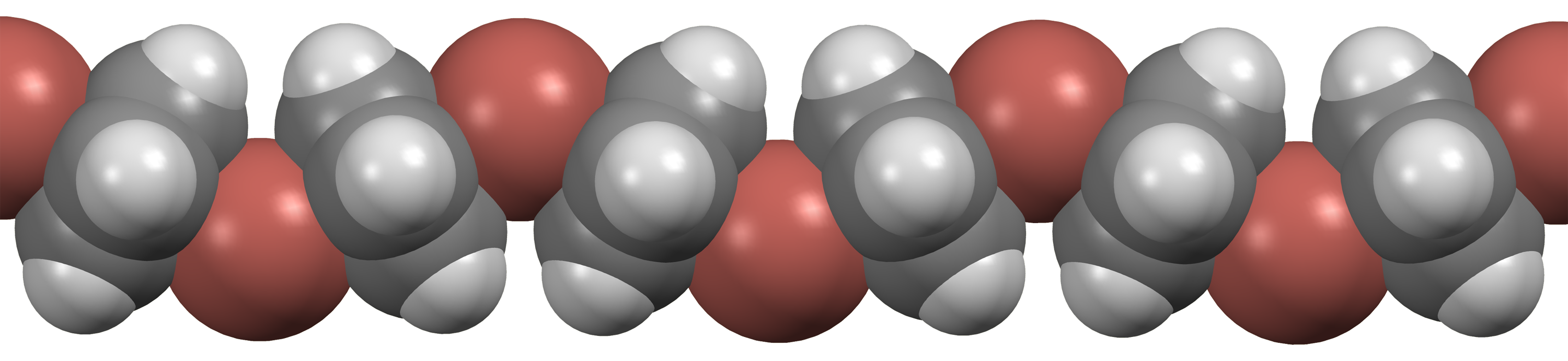

Names
- IUPAC name Thallium(I) cyclopentadienide
- Other names Thallium cyclopentadienide (η^{5}-Cyclopentadienyl)thallium

Identifiers
| CAS Number | 34822-90-7 |
| 3D model (JSmol) | Interactive image |
| ChemSpider | 24721800 |
| ECHA InfoCard | 100.047.466 |
| EC Number | 252-229-2 |
| PubChem CID | 97304 |
- InChI: InChI=1S/C5H5.Tl/c1-2-4-5-3-1;/h1-5H;/q-1;+1 Key: CVEQRUADOXXBRI-UHFFFAOYSA-N; InChI=1/C5H5.Tl/c1-2-4-5-3-1;/h1-5H;/q-1;+1 Key: CVEQRUADOXXBRI-UHFFFAOYAE
- SMILES: [cH-]1cccc1.[Tl+]

Properties
| Chemical formula | C_{5}H_{5}Tl |
| Molar mass | 269.48 g·mol^{−1} |
| Appearance | Light yellow solid |
| Melting point | 300 °C (572 °F; 573 K) |
| Solubility in water | Insoluble |

Hazards
- GHS labelling
| Pictograms | (GHS06: Toxic) (GHS08: Health hazard) (GHS09: Environmental hazard) |
| Signal word | Danger |
| NFPA 704 (fire diamond) | 3 0 0 |
- Except where otherwise noted, data are given for materials in their standard state (at 25 °C [77 °F], 100 kPa). Infobox references

Cyclopentadienylthallium, also known as thallium cyclopentadienide, is an organothallium compound with formula C_{5}H_{5}Tl. This light yellow solid is insoluble in most organic solvents, but sublimes readily. It is used as a precursor to transition metal and main group cyclopentadienyl complexes, as well as organic cyclopentadiene derivatives.

== Preparation and structure ==
Cyclopentadienylthallium is prepared by the reaction of thallium(I) sulfate, sodium hydroxide, and cyclopentadiene:

Tl_{2}SO_{4} + 2 NaOH → 2 TlOH + Na_{2}SO_{4}
TlOH + C_{5}H_{6} → TlC_{5}H_{5} + H_{2}O

A wide variety of thallium salts can substitute for the sulfate, with thallous iodide being the notable exception.

The compound adopts a polymeric structure, consisting of infinite chains of bent metallocenes. The Tl---Tl---Tl angles are 130°. Upon sublimation, the polymer cracks into monomers of C_{5v} symmetry.

== Applications ==
Compared to other cyclopentadienyl (Cp) transfer reagents, such as cyclopentadienyl sodium, CpMgBr and Cp_{2}Mg, cyclopentadienylthallium is less air sensitive. It is also much less of a reducing agent.

Surprisingly, it is stable to water.
