= Grignard reaction =

Organometallic coupling reaction

Classical Grignard reaction
Named after	Victor Grignard
Reaction type	Coupling reaction

Reaction
Methanal/Higher aldehyde/Ketone
+
R-MgX
+
(H_{3}O^{+})
↓
Primary/Secondary/Tertiary alcohols

Identifiers
Organic Chemistry Portal	grignard-reaction
RSC ontology ID	RXNO:0000014

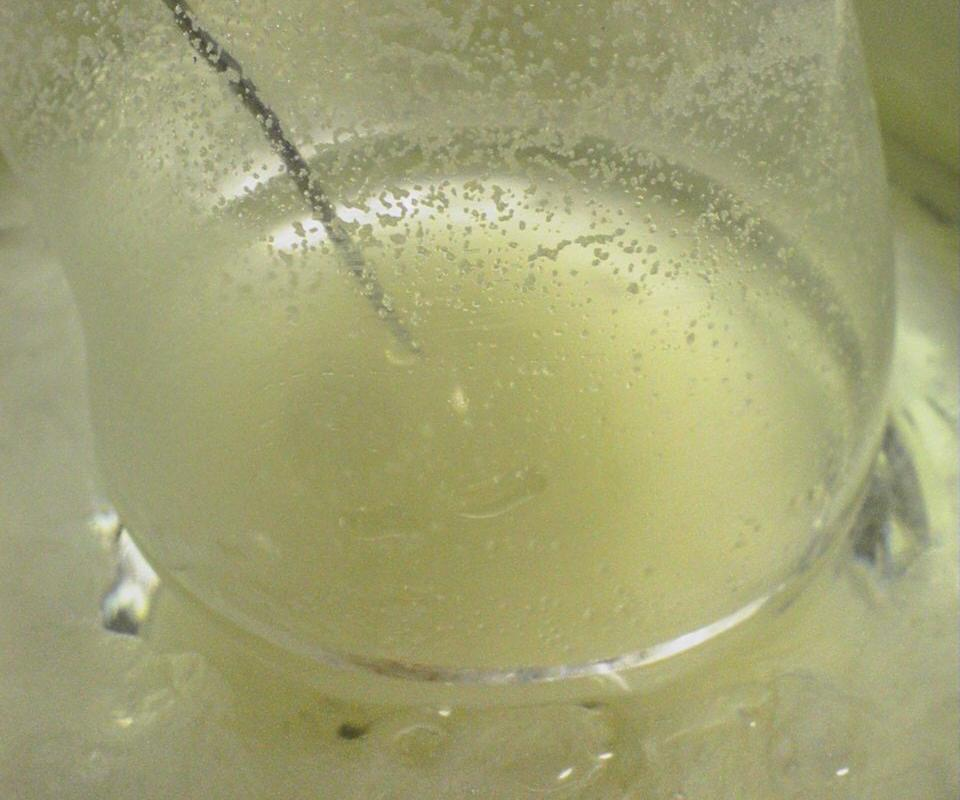
A solution of a carbonyl compound is added to a Grignard reagent. (See gallery)

An example of a Grignard reaction (R_{2} or R_{3} could be hydrogen)

The Grignard reaction (French: [ɡʁiɲaʁ]) is an organometallic chemical reaction in which, according to the classical definition, carbon alkyl, allyl, vinyl, or aryl magnesium halides (Grignard reagent) are added to the carbonyl groups of either an aldehyde or ketone under anhydrous conditions. This reaction is important for the formation of carbon–carbon bonds.

== History and definitions ==
Grignard reactions and reagents were discovered by and are named after the French chemist François Auguste Victor Grignard (University of Nancy, France), who described them in 1900. He was awarded the 1912 Nobel Prize in Chemistry for this work.

The reaction of an organic halide with magnesium is not a Grignard reaction, but provides a Grignard reagent.

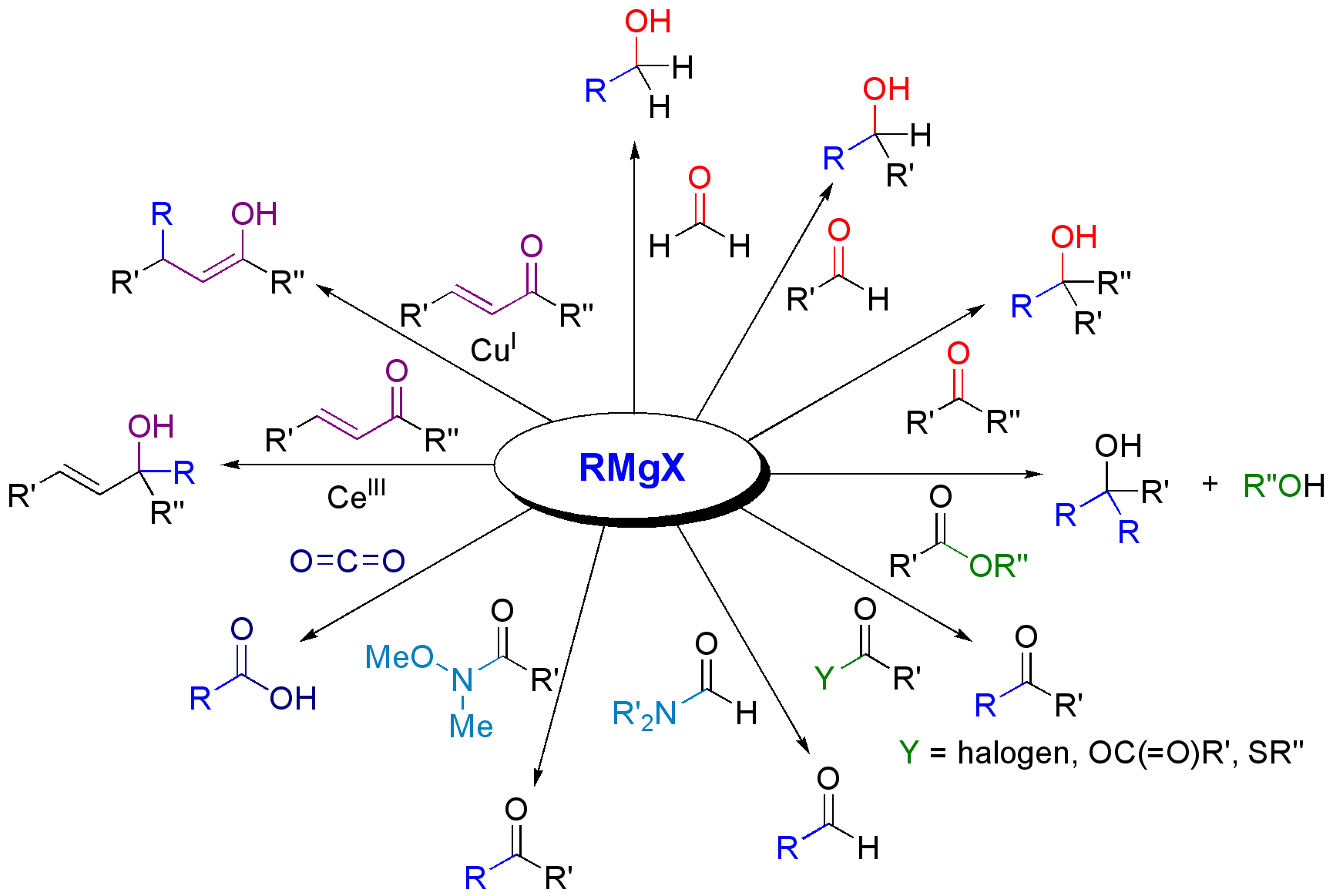
Although Grignard reagents undergo many reactions, the classical Grignard reaction refers only to the reaction of RMgX with ketones and aldehydes, shown in red. X = Cl, Br, I.

Classically, the Grignard reaction refers to the reaction between a ketone or aldehyde group with a Grignard reagent to form a primary or tertiary alcohol. However, some chemists understand the definition to mean all reactions of any electrophiles with Grignard reagents. Therefore, there is some dispute about the modern definition of the Grignard reaction. In the Merck Index, published online by the Royal Society of Chemistry, the classical definition is acknowledged, followed by "A more modern interpretation extends the scope of the reaction to include the addition of Grignard reagents to a wide variety of electrophilic substrates." This variety of definitions illustrates that there is some dispute within the chemistry community about the definition of a Grignard reaction.

Shown below are some reactions involving Grignard reagents, but they themselves are not classically understood as Grignard reactions.

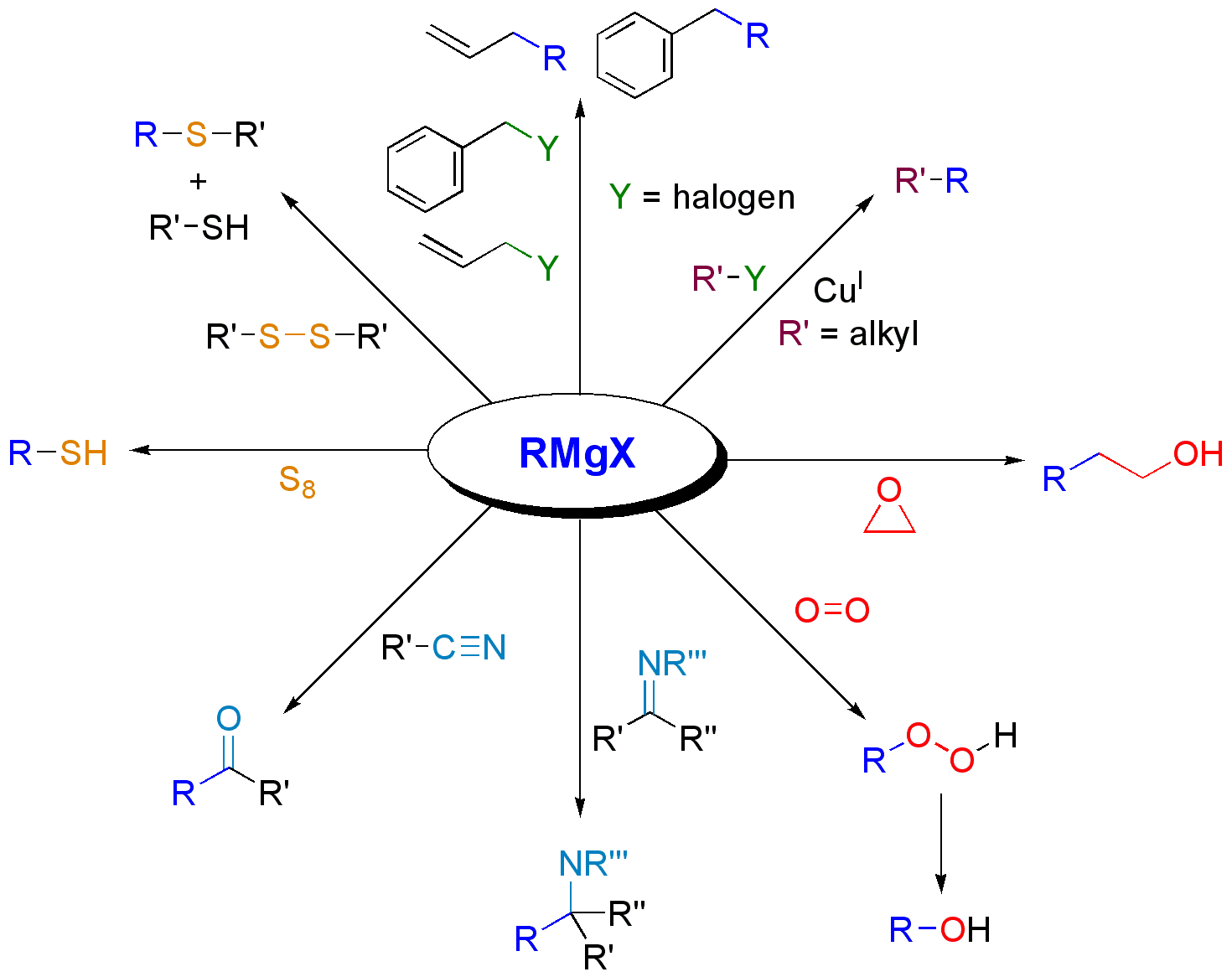
Additional reactions which involve Grignard reagents, but are not considered to be Grignard reactions by the classical definition. X = Cl, Br, I.

== Mechanism and stereochemistry ==
Because carbon is more electronegative than magnesium, the carbon attached to magnesium acts as a nucleophile and attacks the electrophilic carbon atom in the polar bond of a carbonyl group. The addition of the Grignard reagent to the carbonyl group typically proceeds through a six-membered ring transition state, as shown below.

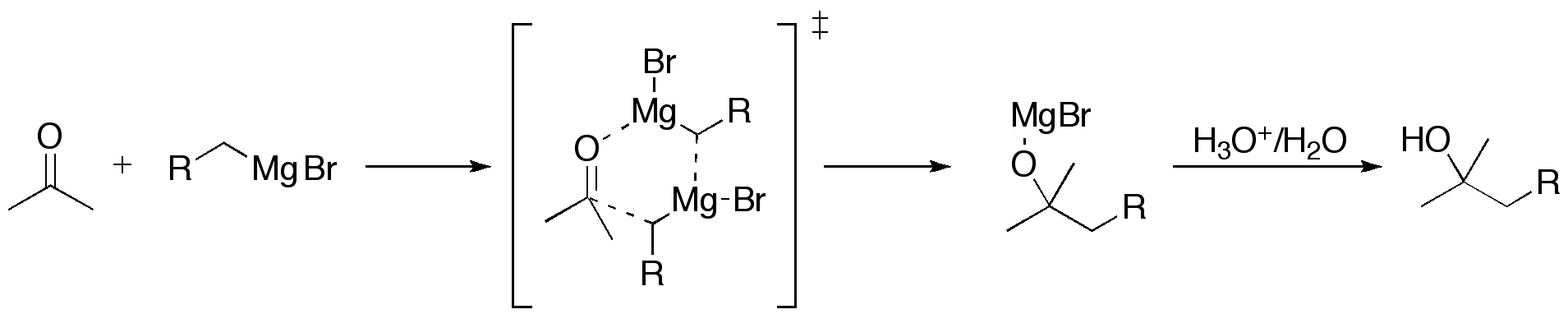
The mechanism of the Grignard reaction.

Consequently, when the Grignard reagent adds to an aldehyde or a prochiral ketone, the Felkin-Anh model or Cram's Rule can usually predict which stereoisomer will be formed.

Based on the detection of radical coupling side products, an alternative single electron transfer (SET) mechanism that involves the initial formation of a ketyl radical intermediate has also been proposed. A recent computational study suggests that the operative mechanism (polar vs. radical) is substrate-dependent, with the reduction potential of the carbonyl compound serving as a key parameter.

== Conditions ==
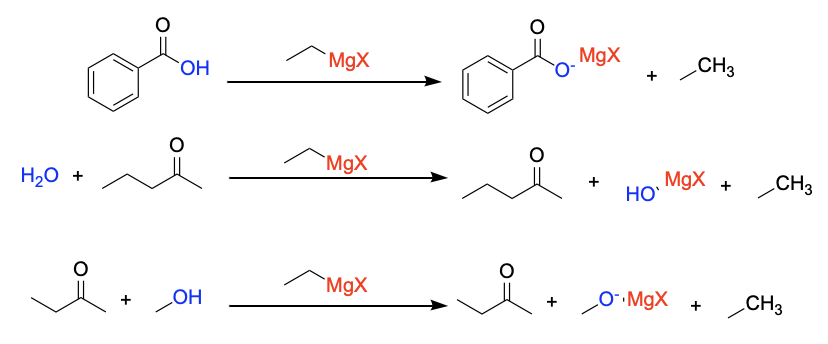
If a Grignard reaction is performed in the presence of water, or any labile proton, the labile proton will quench the Grignard reagent as shown in the figure above.

The Grignard reaction is conducted under anhydrous conditions. Otherwise, the reaction will fail because the Grignard reagent will act as a base rather than a nucleophile and pick up a labile proton rather than attacking the electrophilic site. This will result in no formation of the desired product as the R-group of the Grignard reagent will become protonated while the MgX portion will stabilize the deprotonated species.

To prevent this, Grignard reactions are completed in an inert atmosphere to remove all water from the reaction flask and ensure that the desired product is formed. Additionally, if there are acidic protons in the starting material, as shown in the figure on the right, one can overcome this by protecting the acidic site of the reactant by turning it into an ether or a silyl ether to eliminate the labile proton from the solution prior to the Grignard reaction.

== Variants ==
Other variations of the Grignard reagent have been discovered to improve the chemoselectivity of the Grignard reaction, which include but are not limited to: Turbo-Grignards, organocerium reagents, and organocuprate (Gilman) reagents.

=== Turbo-Grignards ===
Turbo-Grignards are Grignard reagents modified with lithium chloride. Compared to conventional Grignard reagents, Turbo-Grignards are more chemoselective; esters, amides, and nitriles do not react with the Turbo-Grignard reagent.

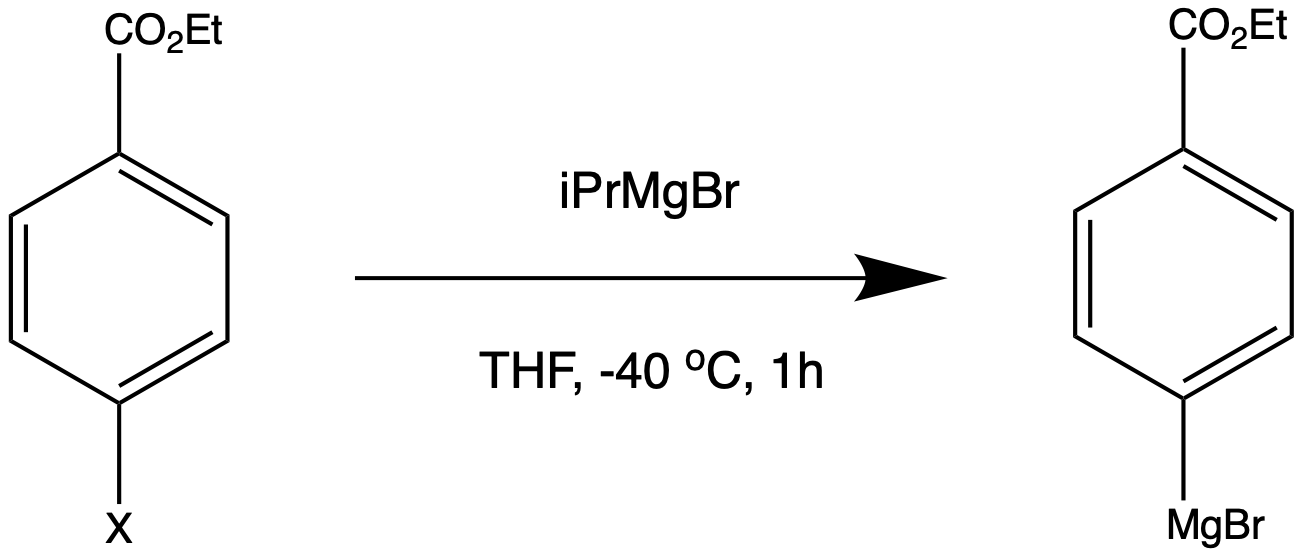
An example reaction of forming a Turbo-Grignard with an ester group.

=== Heterometal-modified Grignard reagents ===
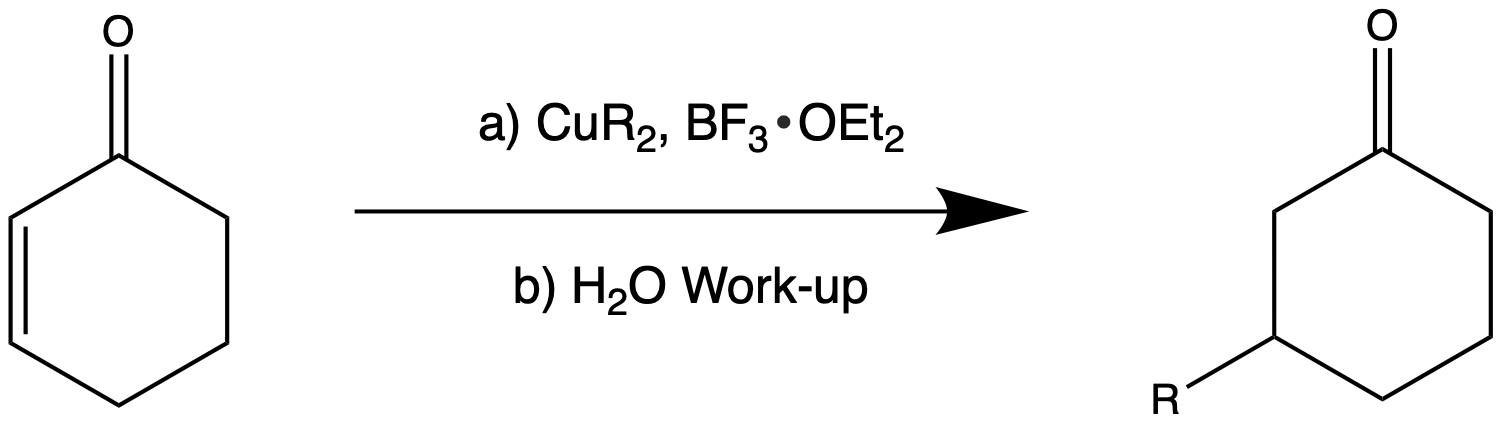
A conjugated 1,4 addition using a Gilman reagent with an arbitrary R group

The behavior of Grignard reagents can be usefully modified in the present of other metals. Copper(I) salts give organocuprates that preferentially effect 1,4 addition. Cerium trichloride allows selective 1,2-additions to the same substrates. Nickel and palladium halides catalyze cross coupling reactions.

== See also ==
- Grignard reagent
- Wittig reaction
- Horner–Wadsworth–Emmons reaction
- Barbier reaction
- Bodroux–Chichibabin aldehyde synthesis
- Fujimoto–Belleau reaction
- Organolithium reagents
- Sakurai reaction
- Indium-mediated allylation
- Alkynylation
