= Philippe Barbier =

French chemist (1848–1922)

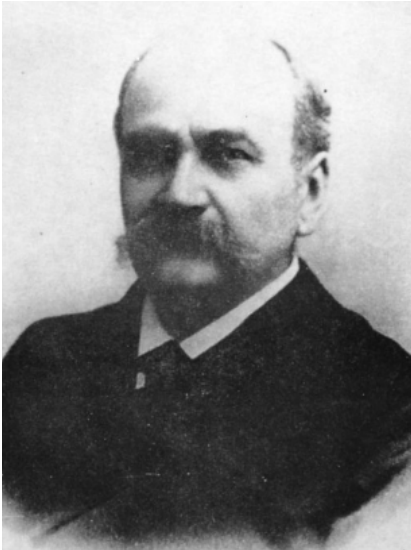
Portrait of Philippe Barbier.

Philippe Antoine Francoise Barbier (2 March 1848 – 18 September 1922) was a French organic chemist. He is best known for his two named reactions in organic synthesis, the Barbier reaction and the Barbier-Wieland degradation, as well as for his role in the creation of organomagnesium reagents with his student, Victor Grignard.

Although Grignard was awarded the Nobel prize in 1912 (along with Sabatier) for his discovery, Barbier and Sabatier's collaborator, Senderens, were snubbed. Grignard himself decried this as an injustice, writing to a friend just days after returning from his Nobel acceptance: “…to tell the truth, and between us, I would even have preferred to wait a little longer, to see the prize shared between Sabatier and Senderens, and then share it myself with Barbier at a later time”. Nevertheless, Barbier's contributions to the scientific community were plentiful and varied, including work in mineralogy, natural products isolation, and polycyclic aromatic hydrocarbons.

== Early life and education ==
Not much is known of Barbier's early life, largely due to his own destruction of nearly every record of his life shortly after the awarding of the 1912 Nobel prize (there is evidence that these events were linked, but this is largely speculative). It is known, however, that in 1848, Phillipe Barbier was born to Elisabeth Gros and Germain François Barbier, a schoolteacher. There is very little information to be found about his early years until he began secondary education at the College de France. His doctoral studies were performed under Berthelot, where he studied the chemistry of fluorene, coumarin, and derivatives thereof. He also discovered novel reactivity of aromatic hydrocarbons such as stilbene and phenanthrene, providing valuable knowledge about the constitution of coal tar and the useful components therein. In addition, he observed the conversion of pineol into cymene during distillation. The École Supérieure de Pharmacy, with Berthelot at the head of his committee, awarded him the degree of Pharmacist, First Class.

After graduation, Barbier worked at the Ecole de Pharmacy de Paris as a preparateur, or laboratory assistant, from 1876 to 1878. He then served as a lecturer at the Faculte des Sciences de Lyon for a year, and in 1879, he obtained his first professorship at the Faculte des Sciences des Besançon. Finally, he was rehired at the Faculte des Sciences de Lyon as professor of chemistry, where he would remain for the remainder of his career.

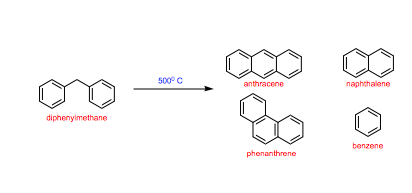
Selected graduate work completed by Barbier under Berthelot.

== Relationship with Grignard and the Nobel Prize ==
In 1899, Barbier published what would become his most famous paper in the chemical community: the first known study of organomagnesium nucleophiles with carbonyl compounds. Whereas organozinc nucleophiles had been noted previously to undergo similar reactions (such as the Zaytsev reaction), organomagnesiums were significantly more reactive towards carbonyl nucleophiles. Barbier noted, though, that the reaction often suffered from low yields and reproducibility problems. He was well known to have more ideas than time, so he tasked his new graduate student, Victor Grignard, with improving his developed conditions. Grignard took to the task with great vigor, and just one year later, in 1900, Grignard published on an alternative procedure which consisted of preformation of the organomagnesium compound followed by addition of the carbonyl substrate. Despite paying homage to Zaytsev and Barbier in the acknowledgements of this first publication, and despite citing Barbier's 1899 communication as the inciting action for his 1900 publication, Grignard would go on to publish on this chemistry and its applications until 1928 as his own intellectual property. Considering that both Grignard and Barbier reported their individual findings as being novel (and that they published separately on the topic), it is difficult to assign credit to one person or the other for the original idea.

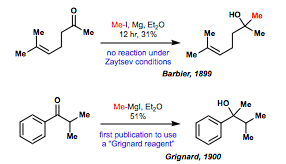
First examples of the Grignard and Barbier reactions.

Though many have speculated on what became of the relationship between teacher and pupil, what is certain is that the two continued to publish together, combining Barbier's newfound knowledge of terpene chemistry with their joint expertise in organomagnesiums to produce 10 more joint papers over the years. Additionally, in line with Grignard's statements about the unfairness of the Nobel award he received, he continued to defend Barbier's contribution to the state of the art (though he claims his input was equally valuable), even taking care to speak with utmost fondness about his “revered master” in a biography written by his son, Robert Grignard.

It is difficult to discern the logic behind the Nobel committee's disregard for Barbier and Senderens. According to colleagues of Grignard's at Lyon, “…with the exception of Grignard and two other students who knew how to get along with Barbier, the latter would have nothing to do with the world around him”. Barbier did, despite destroying his curriculum vitae and all other evidence of his life, eventually spoke with even tones on the matter, saying publicly, “Grignard has pointed out the rightful share that is due him in a discovery of this kind”. Grignard responded in kind with plenty of public praise for his old mentor. In fact, his inaugural speech as chair of chemistry at Lyons, in 1919, paid homage to Barbier, and the latter's contribution to chemical history, saying:

“Allow me, before starting this discourse, to welcome here the memory of my dear master, Professor Barbier, and to present to him my utmost gratitude and admiration. Mr. Barbier has occupied for nearly 40 years this Chair, and has made it shine most brightly. I do not want to undertake the task of presenting to you here, even summarily, the work he has accomplished and its results. I want to emphasize just one point, which should interest you particularly as students. While fierce battles were fought over atomic theory, the major powers in education were harmful to each theory and, in kind, to the educational system of France (much to the benefit of our neighbors, alas!). M. Barbier enthusiastically adopted the new theories (which he had understood at once) and gifted to his students an enlightened perspective. He did not hesitate to sacrifice for what he regarded as the truth, and he was one of the ardent pioneers who, by demonstrating through their teaching and their researches all the power of atomic theory, contributed so effectively to forming the present generation of French chemists.”

The "major power" referred to here is Barbier's own mentor, Berthelot, whose "autocratic influence" over French chemical education made Barbier's insightful stance on the matter even more impressive.

== Contributions to terpene chemistry ==
Barbier (in collaboration with Tiemann and his PhD supervisor Marcellin Berthelot) had a . great interest in determining the structures of fragrance compounds. Due to the lack of structural elucidation tools available at the time, most of this work was done using a combination of elemental analysis and qualitative analysis. Structures elucidated by Barbier include myrcenol, citral, linalool (also known as licareol), and puleone.

Barbier was also interested in the conversion of fragrance compounds into other fragrance compounds. Examples of this include the conversion of citronellol into rhodinol, geraniol (then known as licarhodol) into linalool (then known as licareol), and geranial into menthone.

== Contributions to mineralogy ==
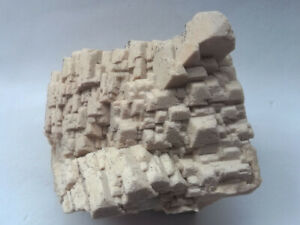
A sample of barbierite.

Barbier's contributions to mineralogy largely concern various feldspars, likely because they were plentiful and yet little was known about their atomic structure. He paid special attention to the establishment of clear designations between the class known as "k-feldspars" (so called because they are rich in potassium), and soda feldspars (rich in sodium). All k-feldspars have the same chemical makeup, but are different in crystal structure, making them polymorphs of one another. The same is true for all soda feldspars. This meant that before the establishment of atomic theory, it was very difficult to distinguish between these polymorphs. Barbier was in fact the first to publish on the noticeable differences between two of these polymorphs, known as orthoclase and microcline, which eventually led to an understanding that each class of feldspar possessed unique orthoclase and microcline minerals, one of which he discovered for the very first time in Rhone, France. When the US Department of the Interior published their geological survey in 1912, they recommended that this new form of monoclinic soda feldspar should henceforth be called "barbierite".
