= Gabriel Barbier-Mueller =

Swiss businessman

Gabriel Barbier-Mueller is the founder and CEO of Harwood International. Gabriel was born and raised in Geneva, Switzerland. He came to Dallas in 1979 and graduated from Dallas's Southern Methodist University. He married Texan Ann Smith.
