= Barbier reaction =

Reaction in organic chemistry

Named after	Philippe Barbier
Reaction type	Coupling reaction

Reaction
R-X
+
Carbonyl group
+
Metal
↓
Primary, secondary or tertiary alcohol

Identifiers
RSC ontology ID	RXNO:0000084

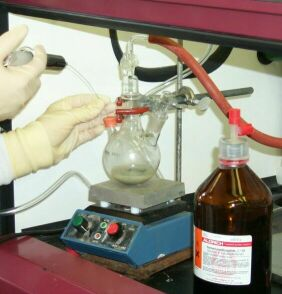
Barbier reaction with samarium(II) iodide

The Barbier reaction is an organometallic reaction between an alkyl halide (chloride, bromide, iodide), a carbonyl group and a metal. The reaction can be performed using magnesium, aluminium, zinc, indium, tin, samarium, barium or their salts. The reaction product is a primary, secondary or tertiary alcohol. The reaction is similar to the Grignard reaction but the crucial difference is that the organometallic species in the Barbier reaction is generated in situ, whereas a Grignard reagent is prepared separately before addition of the carbonyl compound. Unlike many Grignard reagents, the organometallic species generated in a Barbier reaction are unstable and thus cannot be stored or sold commercially. Barbier reactions are nucleophilic addition reactions that involve relatively inexpensive, water insensitive metals (e.g zinc powder) or metal compounds. For this reason, it is possible in many cases to run the reaction in water, making the procedure part of green chemistry. In contrast, Grignard reagents and organolithium reagents are highly moisture sensitive and must be used under an inert atmosphere without the presence of water. The Barbier reaction is named after Philippe Barbier, who was Victor Grignard's teacher.

== Scope ==
Examples of Barbier reactions are the reaction of propargylic bromide with butanal with zinc metal (The attached reference details that the reaction goes to completion after the addition of saturated aqueous ammonium chloride):

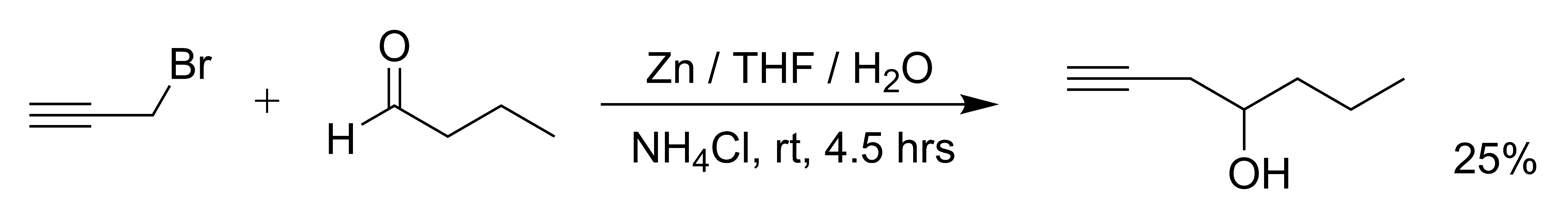
Barbier reaction

With a substituted alkyne instead of a terminal alkyne the allene product is favoured

the intramolecular Barbier reaction with samarium(II) iodide:

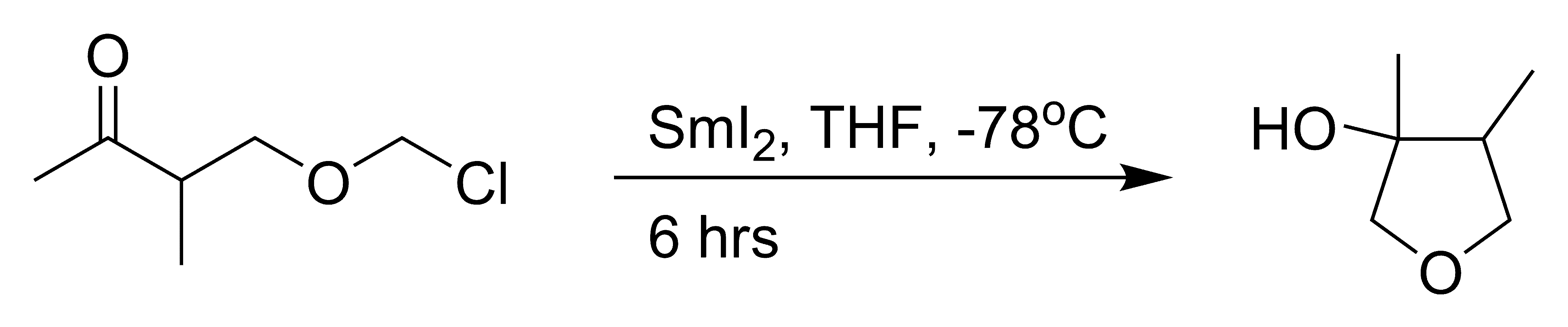
Barbier reaction

the reaction of an allyl bromide with formaldehyde in THF with indium powder:

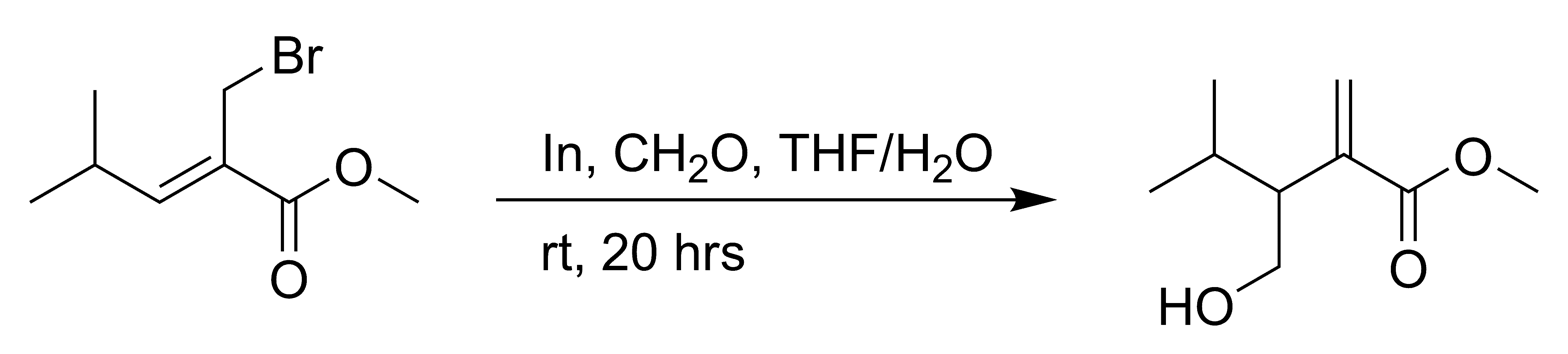
Barbier reaction

The Barbier reaction is accompanied by an allylic rearrangement to a terminal alkene

The reaction of 3-Bromocyclohexene with benzaldehyde and zinc powder in water:

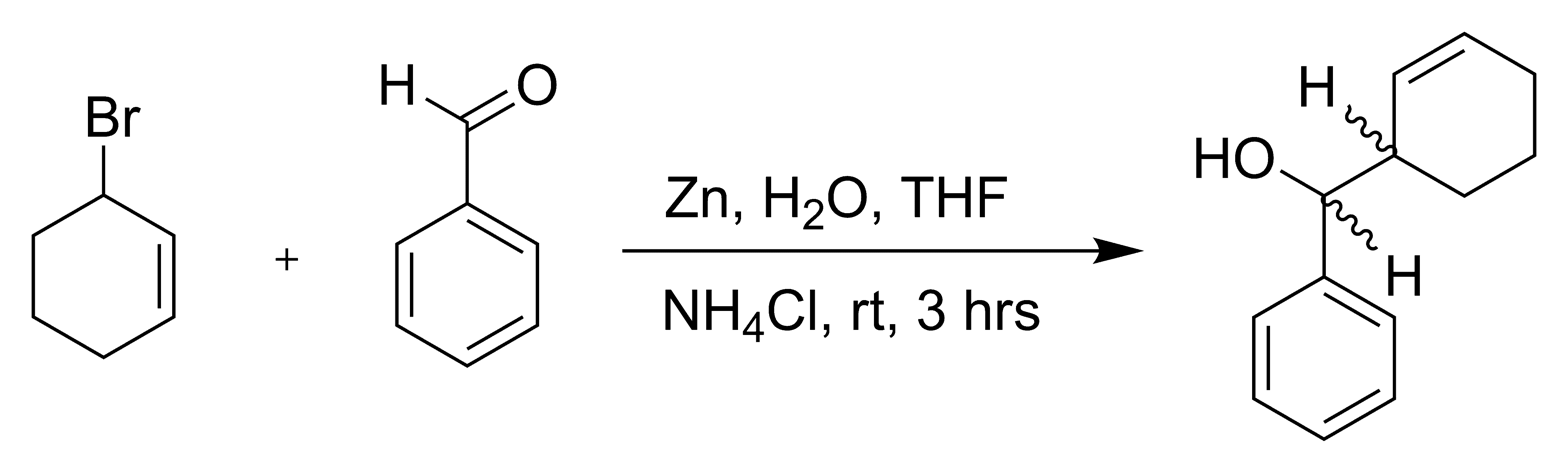
Barbier reaction

The observed diastereoselectivity for this reaction is erythro : threo = 83 : 17

== Asymmetric variants ==
The synthesis of (+)-aspicillin, starts first with a hydroboration, then transmetallation to zinc which can then do an addition into the aldehyde substituent.

(+)-Aspicilin can be synthesized using the Barbier reaction to close the macrocycle, followed by additional steps to complete the synthesis

== See also ==
- Nozaki–Hiyama–Kishi reaction
- Indium mediated allylation
