= Joannès Barbier =

French photographer

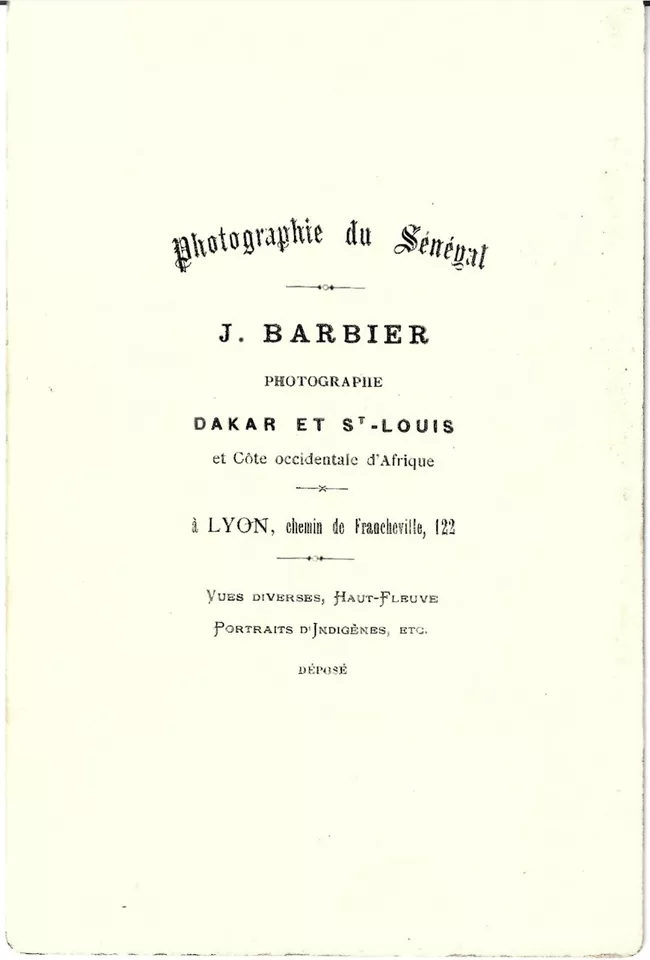
- Back of a cabinet card advertising Joannès Barbier's work in Senegal, including Dakar, Saint-Louis and the West Coast of Africa.
- Born: Jean Ennemond Barbier; 3 March 1854; 2nd arrondissement of Lyon, Lyon, France
- Died: 20 December 1909 (aged 55); 5th arrondissement of Lyon, Lyon, France
- Occupation: photographer
- Years active: 1887-1907
- Known for: Photographs of Africa in the late 19th century.

Jean Ennemond Barbier, commonly known as Joannès Barbier, was a French photographer known for his images in colonial West Africa in the 1890s, operating out of Senegal. His images reached notoriety when he took pictures of massacred Africans, in some cases arranging the scenes for photographic effect. Later, he acted as an organizer of "black villages" or human zoos at the colonial exhibitions in Lyon in 1894, Paris in 1895, and Rouen in 1896.

Photographs in West Africa in the 1890s

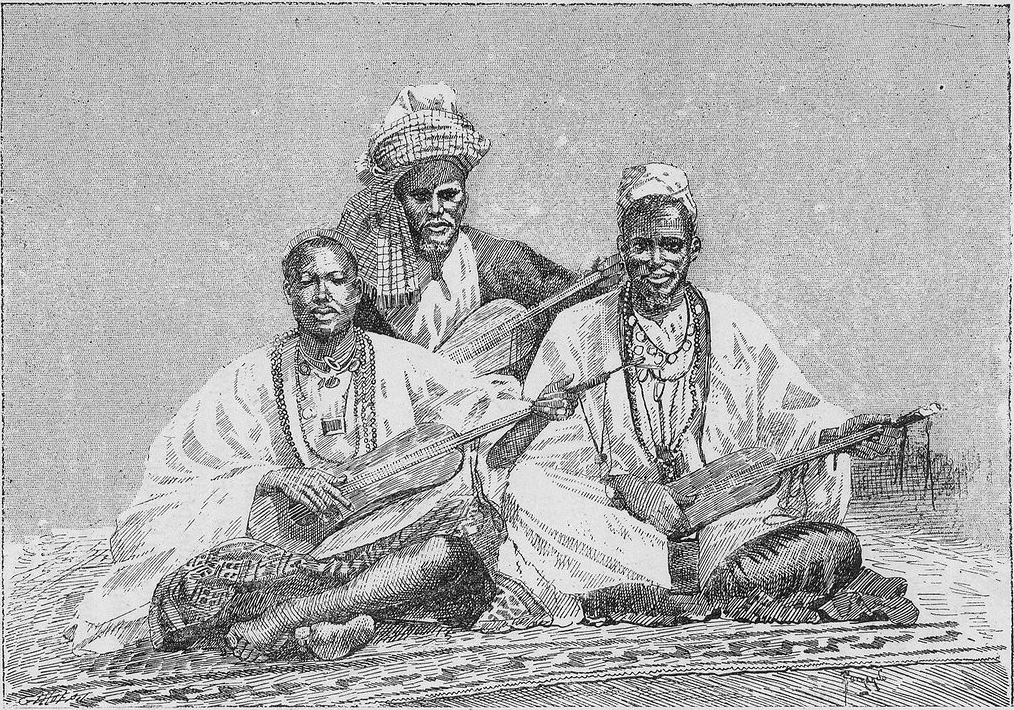
1890. While some photos which Barbier is known for were controversial, he also took images of normal life, such as this image of a group of Fulani musicians from Mali playing hoddu lutes.

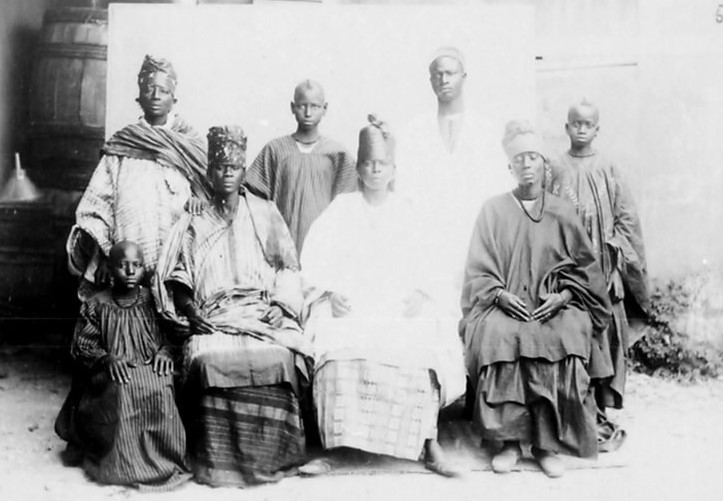
1891. Wolofs near Saint-Louis.

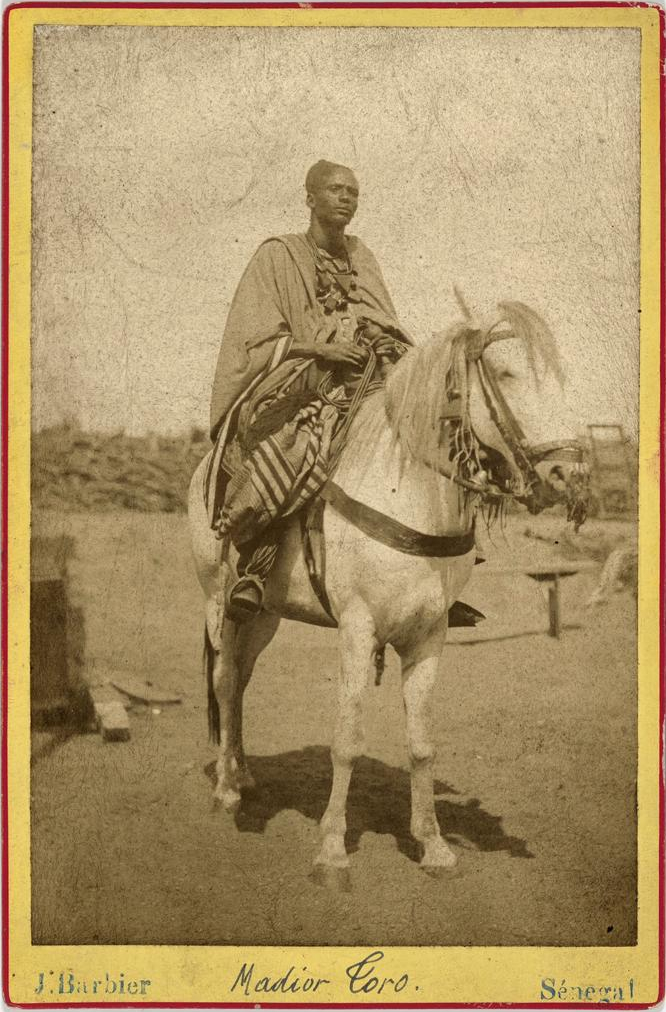
Madior Tioro Fall, son of Damel Madiodio Déguen Coddou, leader of Diambour people.

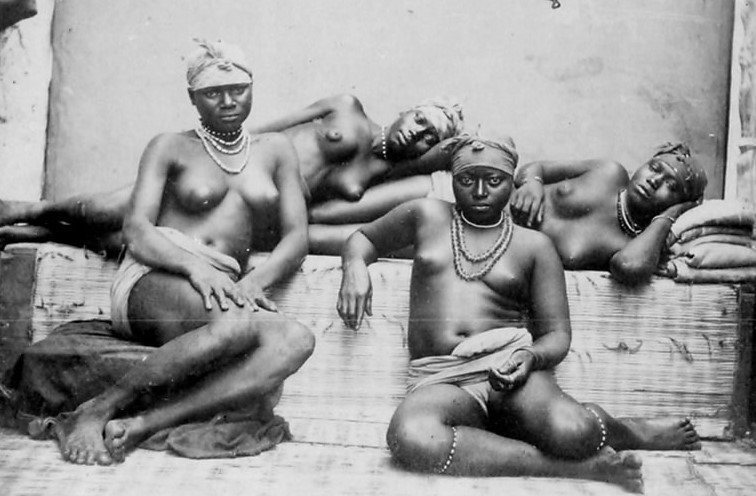
Diolas of Gambia at the banks of the Casamance.

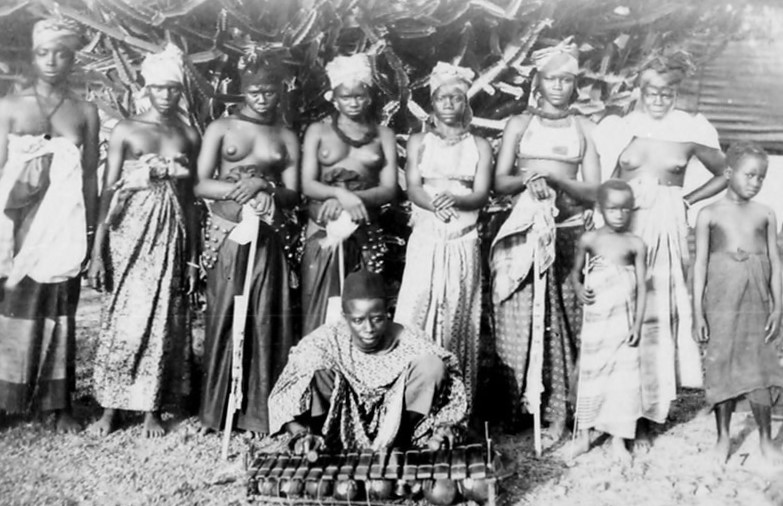
1891. Circumcised girls [sic] in Mellacorea

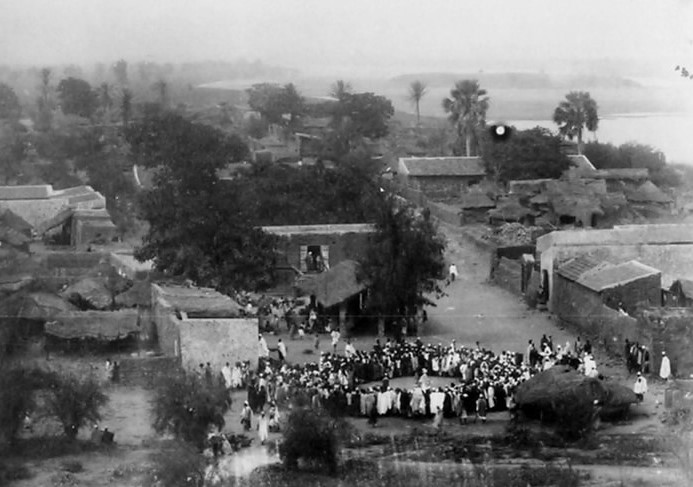
1891. Tam-tam at Bakel in honor of the capture of Nioro.

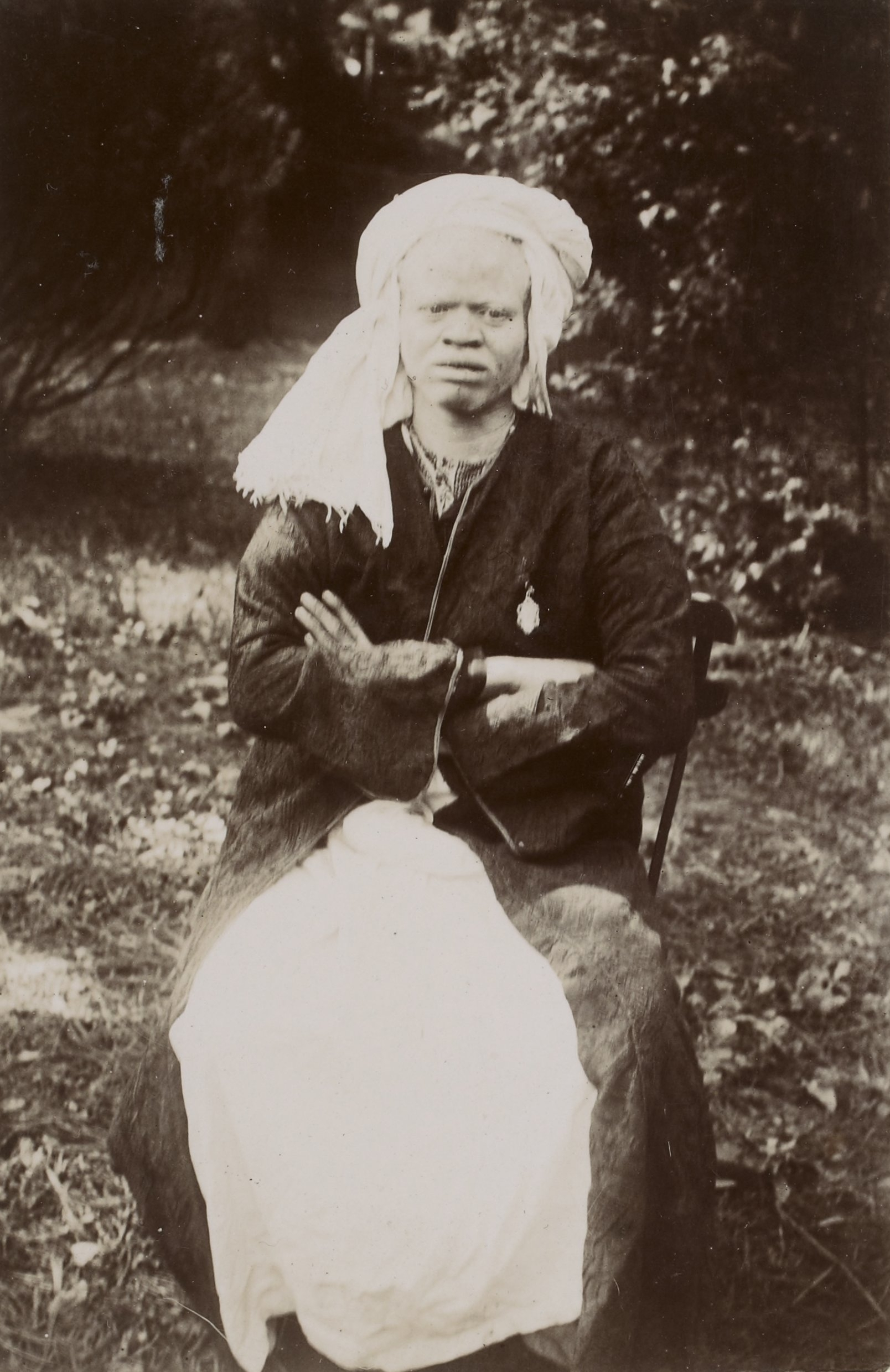
1894. Photo of a black albino woman from Senegal by Joannès Barbier on the occasion of the colonial exhibition in Lyon.

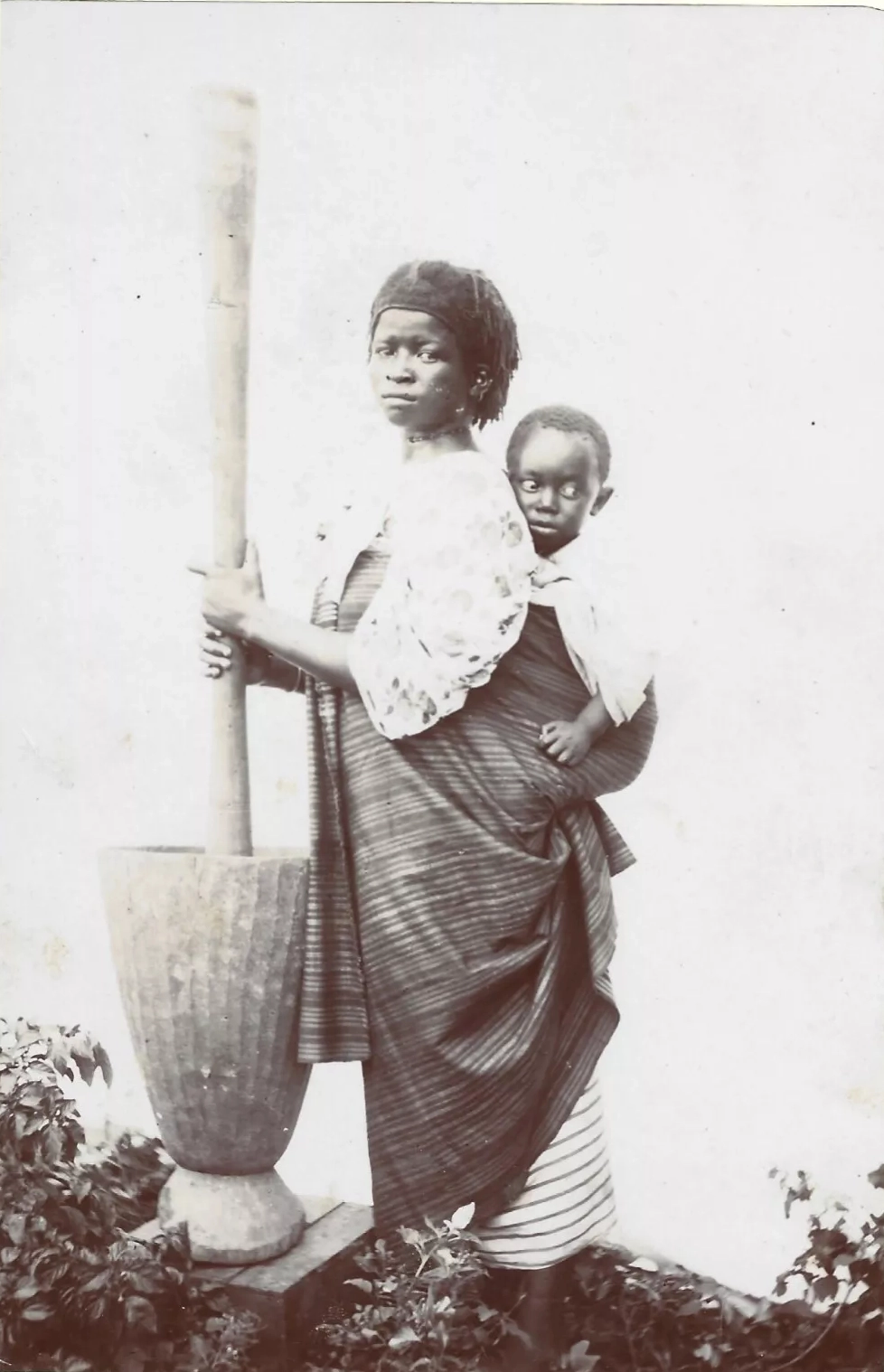
c. 1894-1896 Cabinet card showing a woman from Senegal working while carrying a child.

== Photographer of the Bakel massacre in 1891 ==
In 1891, Joannès Barbier accompanied French officers during the Tukulor War conflict, when the French attacked the Toucouleur empire. He arrived in Bakel at the time when the executions of Toucouleurs were taking place. He took several views of piled-up or decapitated corpses of "supposed fugitives from the enemy army", probably for the private albums of the soldiers. However, some prints were sent to the photographer's brother (Louis Barbier) in France, and the latter sold them to the newspaper L'Illustration. While this newspaper was usually "not very critical of colonial policy", its editors published his photos in controversial article entitled The Work of Civilization in Africa on April 11, 1891. Among those images were pictures from Bakel and from Nioro (where Emporer Amadhu had set his capital during a war for succession with his brothers.

Photographs of the Tukulor War; Massacre at Bakel, 1891. fall of Nioro

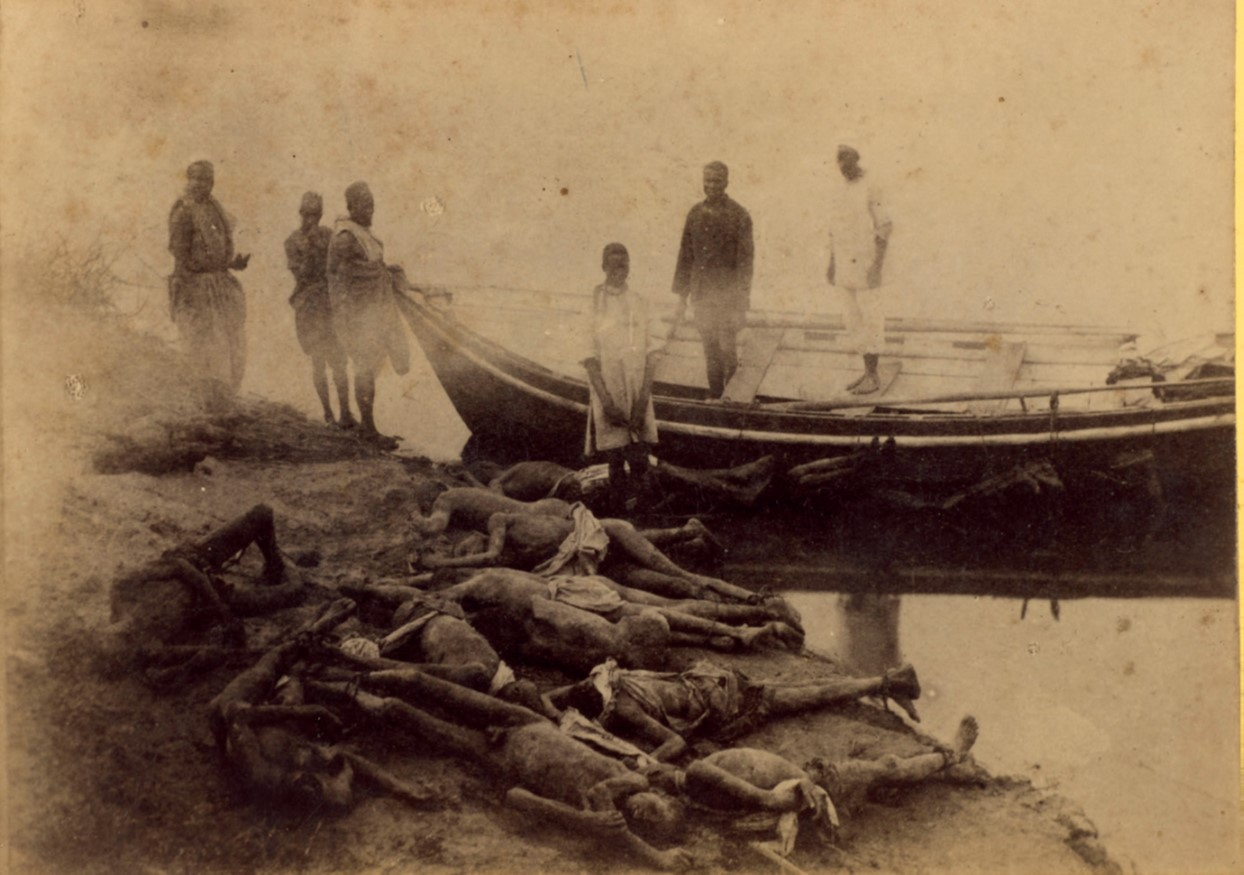
Joannès Barbier, "Bodies dragged to the river bank to be thrown into the water", January 1891, aristotype print glued to cardboard. Army Museum, Paris. Inv. 2015.10.4.

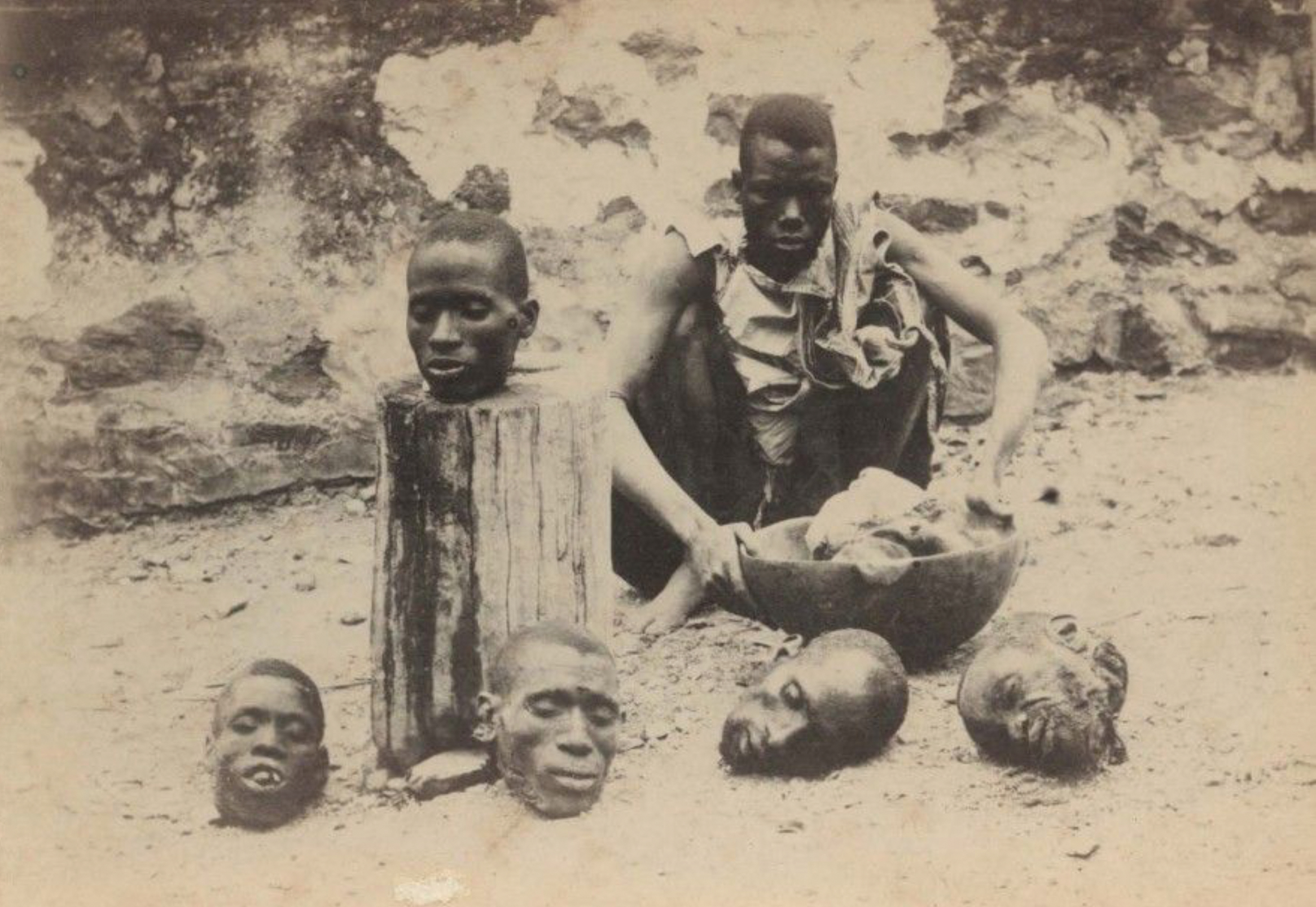
Joannès Barbier, "Native having just brought to Bakel the heads of prisoners captured among the fugitives of Ahmadou’s bands," 1891, aristotype print glued to cardboard. Army Museum, Paris.

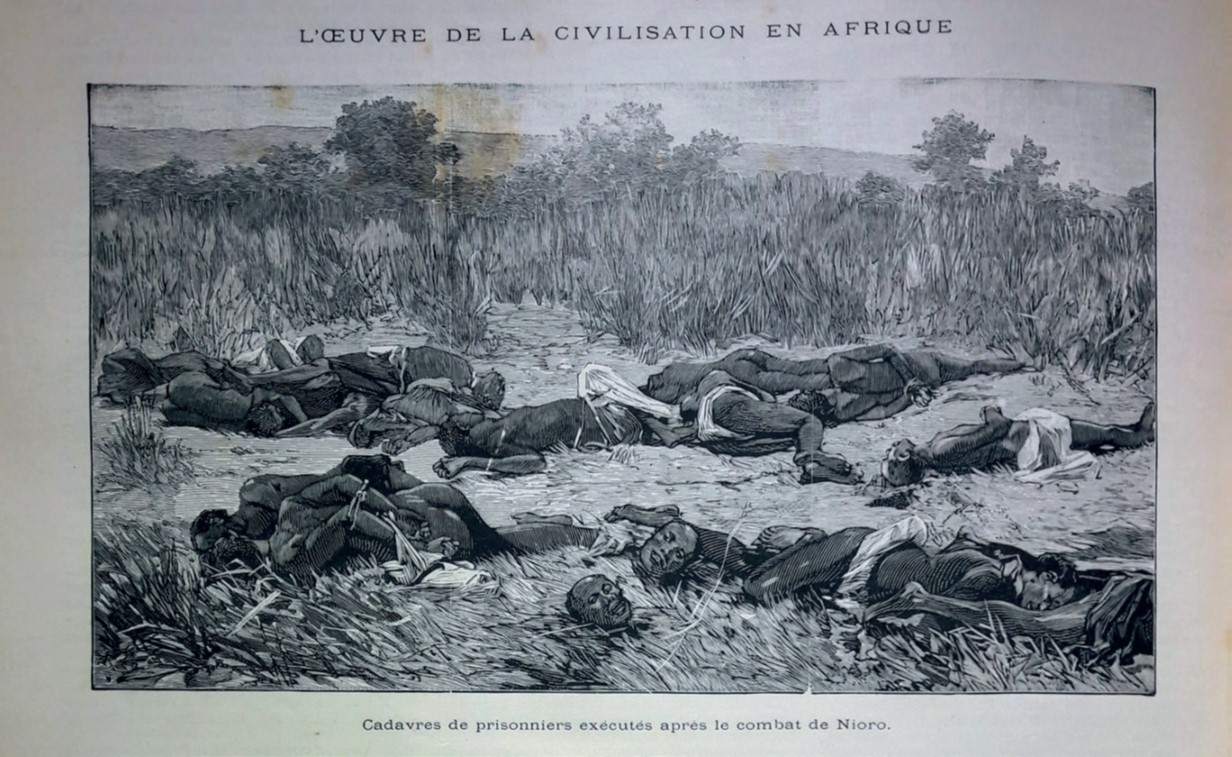
Émile Tilly, "Corpses of prisoners executed after the battle of Nioro", engraving from a Joannès Barbier photograph, in “The work of civilization in Africa”, L'Illustration, no. 2511, April 11, 1891.

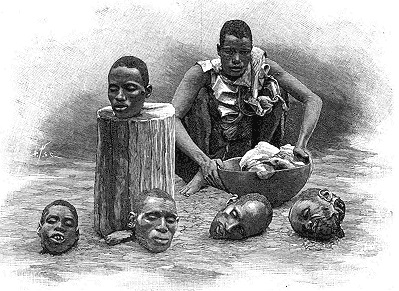
"Native having just brought to Bakel the heads of prisoners captured among the fugitives of Ahmadou’s bands" (L’Illustration, no. 2511, Saturday April 11, 1891).
