= Organoindium chemistry =

Chemistry of compounds with a carbon-indium bond

Organoindium chemistry is the chemistry of compounds containing In-C bonds. The main application of organoindium chemistry is in the preparation of semiconducting components for microelectronic applications. The area is also of some interest in organic synthesis. Most organoindium compounds feature the In(III) oxidation state, akin to its lighter congeners Ga(III) and B(III).

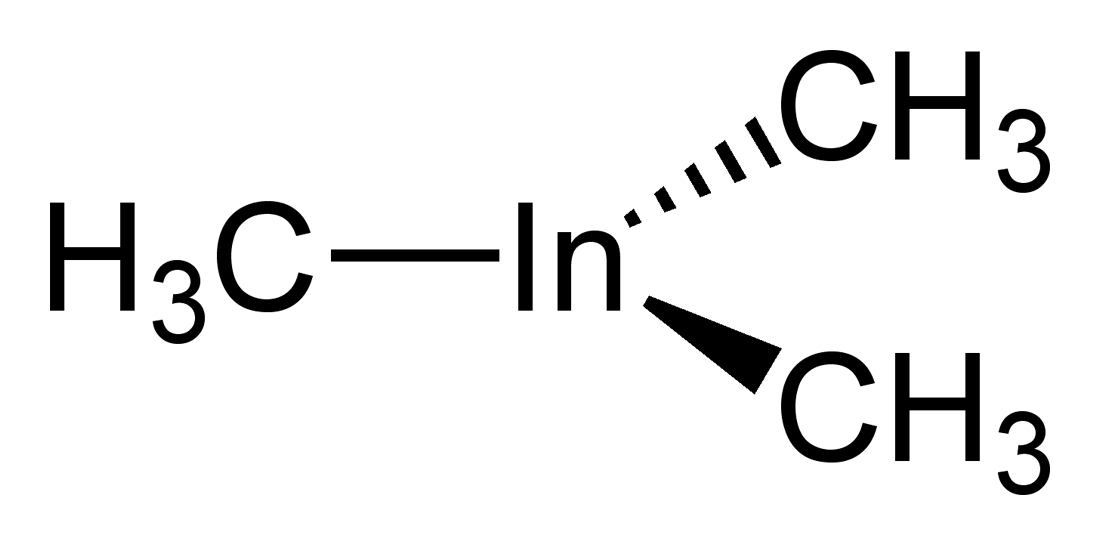
Trimethylindium

== Organoindium(I) ==
Monovalent In is relatively more common than Ga(I) or B(I). One example is cyclopentadienylindium(I).

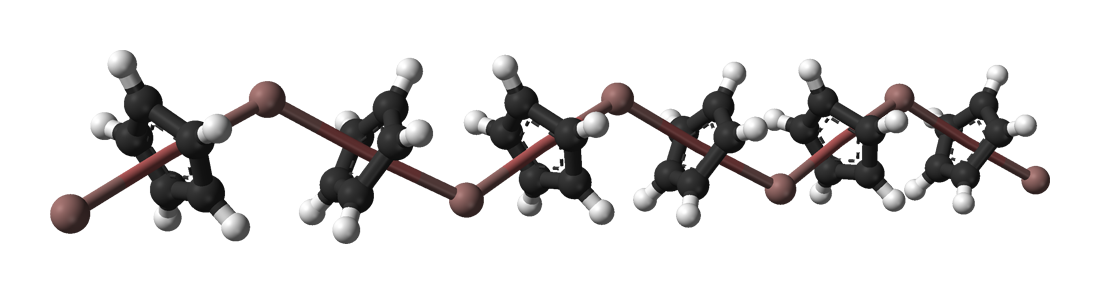
Structure of CpIn, which is a polymer (red = In)

Structure of [InC(tms)_{3}]_{4}, an In(I) tetrahedrane (dark gray = In)

== Organoindium(III) ==
Trimethylindium is a colorless, volatile solid. It is the preferred source of indium for metalorganic vapour phase epitaxy (MOVPE) of indium-containing compound semiconductors, such as InP, InAs, AlInGaNP, etc. InMe_{3} is pyrophoric.

To obtain the trialkyl derivatives, alkylation of indium trihalides with organolithium reagents is typical.

OrganoIn(III) compounds are also prepared by treating In metal with alkyl halides. This reaction gives mixed organoindium halides. Illustrative is the reaction of allyl bromide with a THF suspension of indium. Both monoallylindium dibromide and diallylindium bromide are produced.

A variety of organoindium(III) species such as InRX^{3−} and solvates of RXIn^{+}, R_{2}In^{+}, and X_{2}In^{+} are thought to rapidly interconvert at room temperature.

== Indium-mediated allylations (IMA) ==
IMAs proceed in two steps: first, indium reacts with the allyl halide, give an allyl-In(III) intermediate, second, this allyl indide reacts with an electrophile:
The reaction is conducted under the conditions of a Barbier reaction where the indium, allyl halide, and electrophile are all mixed in a one-pot process. Indium alkylates more readily than other metals, such as Mg, Pb, Bi, or Zn and does not require a promoter or organic solvent. IMAs have advantages over other carbon bond forming reactions because of their ability to be carried out in water (see Green chemistry). Although indium mediated allylations can be carried out in aqueous media, a variety of other solvents may be used including THF (tetrahydrofuran), DMF (dimethylformamide), room temperature ionic liquids, NMF (n-methylformamide), and others. Solvent often affects the solubility, rate of the reaction, yield, stability, regioselectivity, and stereoselectivity. Indium mediates the allylation of a wide variety of electrophiles. The examples in the following scheme illustrate the breadth of applications of IMA.

=== Selectivity ===
Organoindium intermediates do not react with –OH or –CO_{2}H groups. Reactions with carbonyls, however, give high yields. Research has shown that in reactions of an indium intermediate with an electrophilic compound of both aldehyde and ketone, the reaction proceeded with the aldehyde. The electrophilic compound is shown below.

The regioselectivity of allylation mediated by indium in water is dependent on the steric effects of the substituents on both the intermediate and carbonyl. An α-attack from the nucleophile (at the position bearing the halogen) is distinguishable from a γ-attack (at the double bond) by inspecting the products. The scheme below gives an example of two different products formed from the same nucleophile under α-regioselectivity (α) and γ-regioselectivity (γ). This regioselectivity does not appear to depend on conjugation or the degree of substitution.

The addition of allylindium reagents to aldehydes substituted at α or β carbons can be very diastereoselective in aqueous systems. For example, if chelation control is present in an α-oxy aldehyde, the product is expected to be the syn diastereomer. A sample reaction of chelation versus non-chelation control is illustrated below.

Numerous investigations have found an explanation for this effect. The oxygens of the carbonyl and the hydroxyl group chelate the indium of the organoindium intermediate as illustrated below on the left by the two green bonds. The incipient C-C bond, illustrated in red, creates a six-member ring in a chair conformation. Under chelation control, the allyl group attacks the carbonyl carbon from the less hindered side opposite to that of the R group. Once the C-C bond is fully formed, the indium is released, producing the syn diol. A similar chelated structure is relevant to the allylation of β-oxy aldehydes results in anti diols.

The addition of allylindium reagents to electrophilic hydrazones, illustrated below, has been reported to synthesize only one enantiomer of the chiral product with up to 97% selectivity using binol as a chiral additive. Similarly, a chiral amino alcohol allows for extremely high enantioselectivity in the allylation of ketones. The indium-mediated allylation in water is especially useful in carbohydrate synthesis (such as sialic acids), without using protecting groups.

== See also ==
- Krische allylation
- Organogallium Chemistry
- Organothallium Chemistry
