= Victor Grignard =

French chemist (1871–1935)

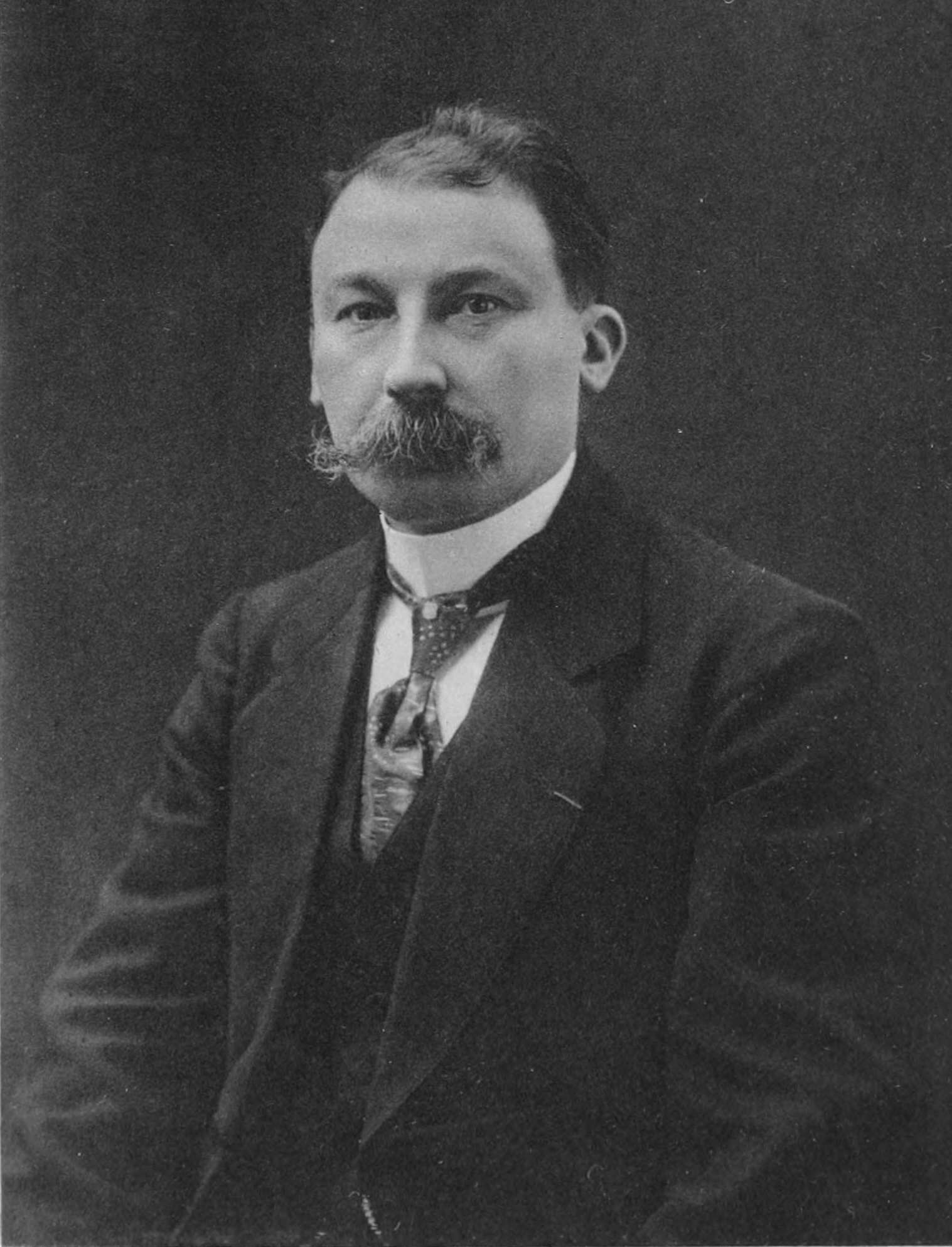
- Grignard in 1912
- Born: 6 May 1871; Cherbourg, France
- Died: 13 December 1935 (aged 64); Lyon, France
- Resting place: Guillotière Cemetery, Lyon
- Education: University of Lyon
- Known for: Grignard reaction Grignard reagent
- Spouse: Augustine Marie Boulant
- Children: Roger Grignard
- Awards: Nobel Prize for Chemistry (1912); Lavoisier Medal (1912)
- Scientific career
- Fields: Organic chemistry
- Workplaces: University of Nancy
- Doctoral advisor: Philippe Barbier

François Auguste Victor Grignard (6 May 1871 – 13 December 1935) was a French chemist who won the Nobel Prize for his discovery of the eponymously named Grignard reagent and Grignard reaction, both of which are important in the formation of carbon–carbon bonds. He also wrote some of his experiments in his laboratory notebooks.

== Biography ==
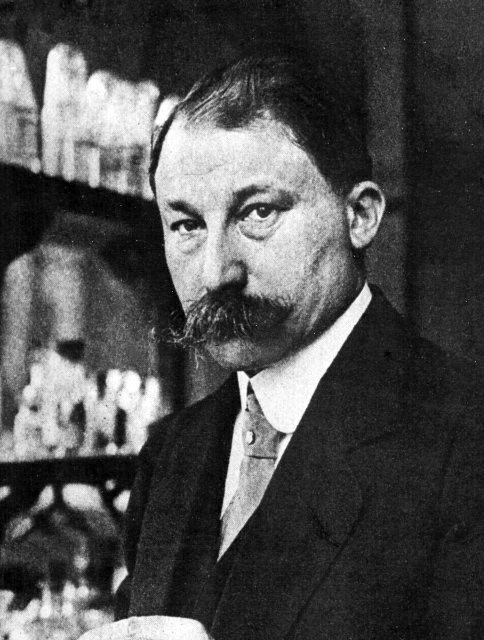
Grignard in 1912. Taken for Nobel Prize publication.

Grignard was the son of a sailmaker. He was a hard-working student and was described as having a humble and friendly attitude. He also had a talent for mathematics. After attempting to major in mathematics, Grignard failed his entrance exams before being drafted into the army in 1892. After one year of service, he returned to pursue his studies of mathematics at the University of Lyon and finally obtained his degree Licencié ès Sciences Mathématiques in 1894. In December of the same year, he transferred to chemistry and began working with Professors Philippe Barbier (1848–1922) and Louis Bouveault (1864–1909). After working with stereochemistry and énines, Grignard was not impressed with the subject matter and asked Barbier about a new direction for his doctoral research. Barbier advised that Grignard study how a failed Saytzeff reaction using zinc, was successful, in low yields, after substitution of magnesium. They sought to synthesize alcohols from alkyl halides, aldehydes, ketones, and alkenes. Grignard hypothesized that the aldehyde or ketone prevented the magnesium from reacting with the alkyl halide, accounting for the low yields. He tested his hypothesis by first adding an alkyl halide and magnesium filings to a solution of anhydrous ether and then adding the aldehyde or ketone. This resulted in a drastic increase in the yield of the reaction.

A couple of years later, Grignard was able to isolate the intermediate. He had heated a mixture of magnesium turnings and isobutyl iodide and added dry ethyl ether to the mixture, observing the reaction. The product is known as a Grignard reagent. Named after him, this organo-magnesium compound (R-MgX) (R = alkyl; X = Halogen) readily reacts with ketones, aldehydes, and alkenes to produce their respective alcohols in impressive yields. Grignard had discovered the synthetic reaction that now bears his name (the Grignard reaction) in 1900. In 1901, he published his doctoral thesis titled "Thèses sur les combinaisons organomagnesiennes mixtes et leur application à des synthèses d'acides, d'alcools et d'hydrocarbures". He became a lecturer in organic chemistry at the University of Nancy in 1909, and was promoted to full professor in 1910. In 1912 he and Paul Sabatier (1854–1941) were awarded the Nobel Prize in Chemistry. During World War I he studied chemical warfare agents with Georges Urbain at Sorbonne University, particularly the manufacture of phosgene and the detection of mustard gas. In 1918, Grignard discovered that sodium iodide could be used as a battlefield test for mustard gas. Sodium iodide converts mustard gas to diiododiethyl sulfide, which crystallizes more easily than mustard gas. This test could detect as little as 0.01 gram of mustard gas in one cubic meter of air and was successfully used on the battlefield. His counterpart on the German side was another Nobel Prize–winning chemist, Fritz Haber.

Grignard died on 13 December 1935 in Lyon, at the age of 64. By that time, around 6,000 papers reporting applications of the Grignard reaction had been published.

== Grignard reaction ==
Grignard is most noted for devising a new method for generating carbon-carbon bonds using magnesium to couple ketones and alkyl halides. This reaction is valuable in organic synthesis. It occurs in two steps:

1. Formation of the "Grignard reagent", which is an organomagnesium compound made by the reaction of an organohalide, R-X (R = alkyl or aryl; and X is a halide, usually bromide or iodide) with magnesium metal. The Grignard reagent is usually described with the general chemical formula R-Mg-X, although its structure is more complex.
2. Addition of the carbonyl, in which a ketone or an aldehyde is added to the solution containing the Grignard reagent. The carbon atom that is bonded to Mg transfers to the carbonyl carbon atom, and the oxygen of the carbonyl carbon becomes attached to the magnesium to give an alkoxide. The process is an example of a nucleophilic addition to a carbonyl. After the addition, the reaction mixture is treated with aqueous acid to give an alcohol, and the magnesium salts are subsequently discarded.

== Military service ==
Grignard was drafted into the French military as part of obligatory military service in 1892. Within the two years of his first session of service he rose to the rank of corporal. He was demobilized in 1894 and returned to Lyon to pursue his education. He was awarded a medal of the Legion of Honour and made a Chevalier in 1912 after winning the Nobel Prize. When World War I broke out, Grignard was drafted back into the military, keeping his rank of corporal. He was placed on sentry duty, and served there for several months until he was brought to the attention of the General Staff. Grignard had been wearing his Medal of the Legion of Honour, despite being ordered to take it off by a superior. After looking more into Grignard, the General Staff decided that he would be better suited for research than sentry duty, so they assigned him to the explosives division. Grignard's research shifted to antidotes to chemical weapons when production of TNT was no longer sustainable, and eventually Grignard was assigned to research new chemical weapons for the French army.

== Honors ==
- 1912: Nobel Prize in Chemistry for his discovery of the Grignard reagent (shared the award with fellow Frenchman Paul Sabatier).
- 1912: Lavoisier Medal, Société Chimique de France
- 1933: Légion d'Honneur, Commander
