= Arene complexes of univalent gallium, indium, and thallium =

Arene complexes of univalent gallium, indium, and thallium are complexes featuring the centric (η^{6}) coordination of the metal to the arene. Although arene complexes of transitional metals have long been reported, arene complexes of the main group elements remain scarce. This might be partly explained by the difference in energy of the d and p orbitals.

== Synthesis and structures ==
=== Ga(I)-arene complexes ===
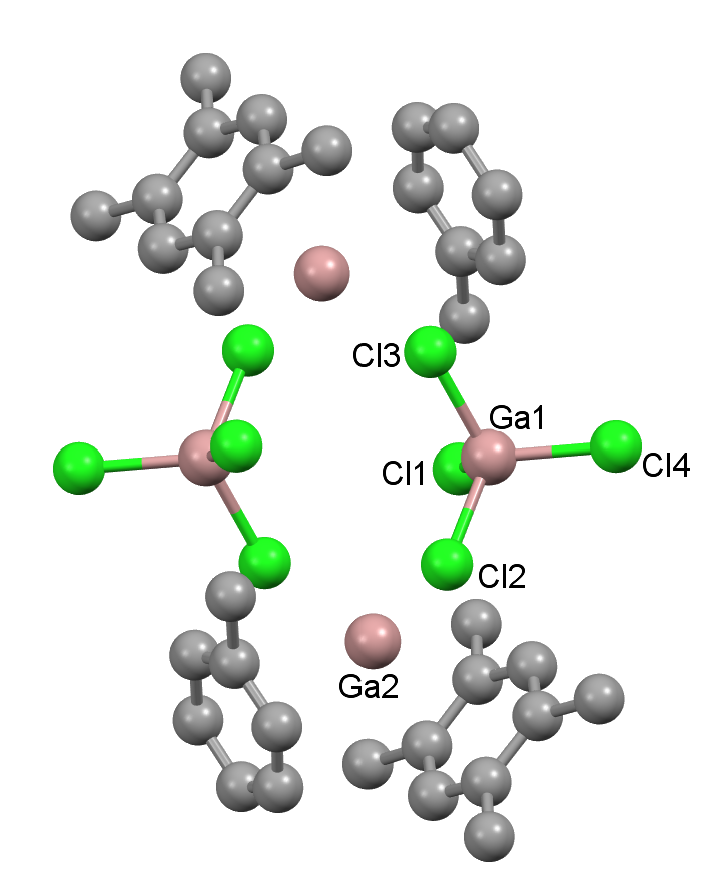
Single crystal structure of a Ga(I)-arene complex

Benzene Ga(I) complexes have been discovered since 1967, and phase diagram studies and vibrational spectroscopy combined with ^{71}Ga-NMR suggested the interaction between Ga(I) and arenes. However, there was no direct crystallographic evidence for such structures, so the existence of Ga(I)-arene complexes remained in doubt for a long time. The first Ga(I)-arene complex characterized by X-ray diffraction experiments is [{(C_{6}H_{6})_{2}Ga}^{+}{GaCl_{4}}^{−}]_{2}, which was obtained by cooling a saturated Ga[GaCl_{4}] benzene solution to room temperature. After that, a series of Ga(I)-arene complexes of different structures have been reported, and these corroborative examples make the existence of benzene-metal interactions for p-block elements no doubt.

=== In(I)-arene complexes ===
In(I)-arene complexes are more difficult to obtain than their gallium analogs. There have been a lot of efforts in trying to react indium subhalides with different kinds of hydrocarbons, but no reaction takes place. However, it was found that In[InBr_{4}] readily reacts with 1,3,5-trimethylbenzene to form {[(CH_{3})_{3}C_{6}H_{3}]_{2}In(InBr_{4})}, which features chain-like coordination polymers of [InBr_{4}]^{−}-linked bis(arene)indium moieties.

=== Tl(I)-arene complexes ===
Despite the fact that thallium(I) tetrahalometalates are soluble in aromatic solvents, these Tl(I)-arene complexes are very unstable and hard to characterize. The first example of Tl(I)-arene complex characterized by X-ray diffraction experiments is [(1,3,5-(CH_{3})_{3}C_{6}H_{3})_{6}TI_{4}(GaBr_{4})_{4}], which is synthesized by reacting Tl[GaBr_{4}] with mesitylene. In this complex, both mono- and bis(arene)thallium moieties are in the same cluster.

== Bonding ==
Metal-arene complexes are best described as donor-acceptor adducts, with the π system being the donor component. This bonding mode is also supported by the fact that when electron-releasing substituents are introduced, the stability of these complexes is enhanced. In the molecular orbital description of a mono arene Ga(I) complex, the Lowest Unoccupied Atomic Orbital of the metal and the Highest Occupied Molecular Orbital(HOMO) of the arene have the same symmetry and lead to bonding and antibonding interactions. In this case, the four electrons in the HOMO of the arene fill in the binding orbitals, accounting for the interactions between metal and the arene. However, due to the large difference in the energy of arene and metal orbitals, this binding interaction is relatively weak and can not compete with other metal-ligand interactions.

== Practical aspects ==
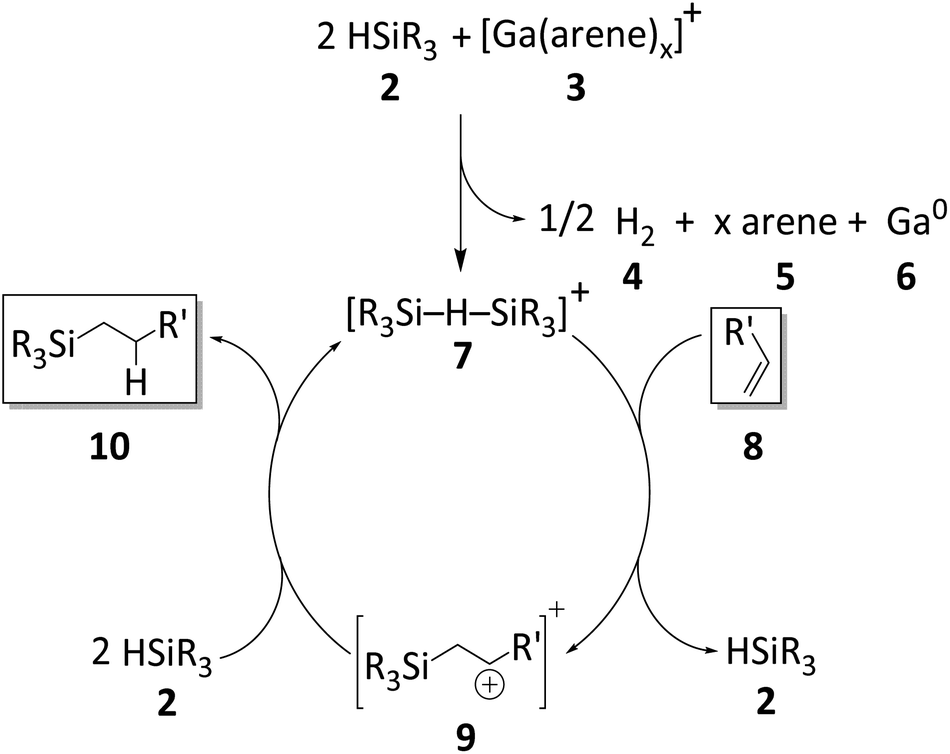
Proposed catalytic cycle for the hydrosilylation of olefins initiated by Ga^{+} (arene = oDFB or PhF)

Research on these arene/Ga(I), In(I), Tl(I) systems are not only of scientific significance but also have potential significance in the application. First off, they are strong homogeneous reducing agents which may lead to new structures and reactivities. What is more, gallium has an acceptable price and is of no environmental concern. Secondly, they can serve as catalysts/initiators in catalytic cycles. Recently, Krossing and coworkers reported a Ga(I) initiated hydrosilylation reaction, which opens up new windows for main group catalysis. Finally, the fast development in the industry of electrical conductors and semiconductors creates a huge demand for ultra-high purity metals among which gallium and Indium are two very important ones. The unique solubility of Ga(I) and In(I) arene complexes opens new avenues for metal separation. By applying electrochemical methods, metals of ultra-high purity can be recovered from solutions.
