= List of semiconductor materials =

Semiconductor materials are nominally small band gap insulators. The defining property of a semiconductor material is that it can be compromised by doping it with impurities that alter its electronic properties in a controllable way. Because of their application in the computer and photovoltaic industry—in devices such as transistors, lasers, and solar cells—the search for new semiconductor materials and the improvement of existing materials is an important field of study in materials science.

Most commonly used semiconductor materials are crystalline inorganic solids, which are classified according to the periodic table groups of their constituent atoms.

Different semiconductor materials differ in their properties. Thus, in comparison with silicon, compound semiconductors have both advantages and disadvantages. For example, Gallium arsenide (GaAs) has six times higher electron mobility than silicon, which allows faster operation; wider band gap, which allows operation of power devices at higher temperatures, and gives lower thermal noise to low power devices at room temperature; its direct band gap gives it more favorable optoelectronic properties than the indirect band gap of silicon; it can be alloyed to ternary and quaternary compositions, with adjustable band gap width, allowing light emission at chosen wavelengths, which makes possible matching to the wavelengths most efficiently transmitted through optical fibers. GaAs can also be grown in a semi-insulating form, which is suitable as a lattice-matching insulating substrate for GaAs devices. Conversely, silicon is robust, cheap, and easy to process, whereas GaAs is brittle and expensive, and insulation layers cannot be created by just growing an oxide layer; GaAs is therefore used only where silicon is not sufficient.

By alloying multiple compounds, some semiconductor materials are tunable, e.g., in band gap or lattice constant. The result is ternary, quaternary, or even quinary compositions. Ternary compositions allow adjusting the band gap within the range of the involved binary compounds; however, in case of combination of direct and indirect band gap materials there is a ratio where indirect band gap prevails, limiting the range usable for optoelectronics; for example, Aluminium gallium arsenide (AlGaAs) LEDs are limited to 660 nm by this. Lattice constants of the compounds also tend to be different, and the lattice mismatch against the substrate, dependent on the mixing ratio, causes defects in amounts dependent on the mismatch magnitude; this influences the ratio of achievable radiative/nonradiative recombinations and determines the luminous efficiency of the device. Quaternary and higher compositions allow adjusting simultaneously the band gap and the lattice constant, allowing increasing radiant efficiency at wider range of wavelengths; for example, Aluminium gallium indium phosphide (AlGaInP) is used for LEDs. Materials transparent to the generated wavelength of light are advantageous, as this allows more efficient extraction of photons from the bulk of the material. That is, in such transparent materials, light production is not limited to just the surface. Index of refraction is also composition-dependent and influences the extraction efficiency of photons from the material.

== Types of semiconductor materials ==
- Group III elemental semiconductors, (B)
- Group IV elemental semiconductors, (C, Si, and Ge)
- Group IV compound semiconductors
- Group VI elemental semiconductors, (Se and Te)
- III–V semiconductors: Crystallizing with high degree of stoichiometry, most can be obtained as both n-type and p-type. Many have high carrier mobilities and direct energy gaps, making them useful for optoelectronics. (See also: Template:III-V compounds.)
- II–VI semiconductors: usually p-type, except ZnTe and ZnO which are n-type
- I–VII semiconductors
- IV–VI semiconductors
- V–VI semiconductors
- II–V semiconductors
- I–III–VI_{2} semiconductors
- Oxides
- Layered semiconductors
- Magnetic semiconductors
- Organic semiconductors
- Charge-transfer complexes
- Some of MOFs.
- Others

== Compound semiconductors ==
A compound semiconductor is a semiconductor compound composed of chemical elements of at least two different species. These semiconductors form in periodic table groups 13–15 (old names IIIA-VA). The range of possible formulae is quite broad because these elements can form binary (two elements, e.g. gallium(III) arsenide (GaAs)), ternary (three elements, e.g. indium gallium arsenide (InGaAs)) and quaternary alloys (four elements) such as aluminium gallium indium phosphide (AlInGaP)) alloy and indium arsenide antimonide phosphide (InAsSbP). The properties of III-V compound semiconductors are similar to their group IV counterparts. The higher ionicity in these compounds, and especially in the II-VI compound, tends to increase the fundamental bandgap with respect to the less ionic compounds.

=== Fabrication ===
Metalorganic vapor-phase epitaxy (MOVPE) is the most popular deposition technology for the formation of compound semiconducting thin films for devices. It uses ultrapure metalorganics and/or hydrides as precursor source materials in an ambient gas such as hydrogen.

Other techniques of choice include:

- Molecular-beam epitaxy (MBE)
- Hydride vapor-phase epitaxy (HVPE)
- Liquid phase epitaxy (LPE)
- Metal-organic molecular-beam epitaxy (MOMBE)
- Atomic layer deposition (ALD)

== Table of semiconductor materials ==
Group	Elem.	Material	Formula	Band gap (eV)	Gap type	Description
IV	1	Silicon	Si	1.12	indirect	Used in conventional crystalline silicon (c-Si) solar cells, and in its amorphous form as amorphous silicon (a-Si) in thin-film solar cells. Most common semiconductor material in photovoltaics; dominates worldwide PV market; easy to fabricate; good electrical and mechanical properties. Forms high quality thermal oxide for insulation purposes. Most common material used in the fabrication of integrated circuits.
IV	1	Germanium	Ge	0.67	indirect	Used in early radar detection diodes and first transistors, with lesser purity required than silicon. A substrate for high-efficiency multijunction photovoltaic cells. Very similar lattice constant to gallium arsenide. High-purity crystals used for gamma spectroscopy. May grow whiskers, which impair reliability of some devices.
IV	1	Diamond	C	5.47	indirect	Excellent thermal conductivity. Superior mechanical and optical properties. High carrier mobilities and high electric breakdown field at room temperature as excellent electronics characteristics. Extremely high nanomechanical resonator quality factor.
IV	1	Gray tin, α-Sn	Sn	0	semimetal	Low temperature allotrope (diamond cubic lattice).
IV	2	Silicon carbide, 3C-SiC	SiC	2.3	indirect	Used for early yellow LEDs
IV	2	Silicon carbide, 4H-SiC	SiC	3.3	indirect	Used for high-voltage and high-temperature applications
IV	2	Silicon carbide, 6H-SiC	SiC	3.0	indirect	Used for early blue LEDs
VI	1	Sulfur, α-S	S_{8}	2.6		
VI	1	Gray (trigonal) selenium	Se	1.83–2.0	indirect	Used in selenium rectifiers and solar cells. Band gap depends on fabrication conditions.
VI	1	Red selenium	Se	2.05	indirect	
VI	1	Tellurium	Te	0.33		
III-V	2	Boron nitride, cubic	BN	6.36	indirect	Potentially useful for ultraviolet LEDs
III-V	2	Boron nitride, hexagonal	BN	5.96	quasi-direct	Potentially useful for ultraviolet LEDs
III-V	2	Boron nitride nanotube	BN	5.5		
III-V	2	Boron phosphide	BP	2.1	indirect	
III-V	2	Boron arsenide	BAs	1.82	direct	Ultrahigh thermal conductivity for thermal management; Resistant to radiation damage, possible applications in betavoltaics.
III-V	2	Boron arsenide	B_{12}As_{2}	3.47	indirect	Resistant to radiation damage, possible applications in betavoltaics.
III-V	2	Aluminium nitride	AlN	6.28	direct	Piezoelectric. Not used on its own as a semiconductor; AlN-close GaAlN possibly usable for ultraviolet LEDs. Inefficient emission at 210 nm was achieved on AlN.
III-V	2	Aluminium phosphide	AlP	2.45	indirect	
III-V	2	Aluminium arsenide	AlAs	2.16	indirect	
III-V	2	Aluminium antimonide	AlSb	1.6/2.2	indirect/direct	
III-V	2	Gallium nitride	GaN	3.44	direct	Problematic to be doped to p-type, p-doping with Mg and annealing allowed first high-efficiency blue LEDs and blue lasers. Very sensitive to ESD. Insensitive to ionizing radiation. GaN transistors can operate at higher voltages and higher temperatures than GaAs, used in microwave power amplifiers. When doped with e.g. manganese, becomes a magnetic semiconductor.
III-V	2	Gallium phosphide	GaP	2.26	indirect	Used in early low to medium brightness cheap red/orange/green LEDs. Used standalone or with GaAsP. Transparent for yellow and red light, used as substrate for GaAsP red/yellow LEDs. Doped with S or Te for n-type, with Zn for p-type. Pure GaP emits green, nitrogen-doped GaP emits yellow-green, ZnO-doped GaP emits red.
III-V	2	Gallium arsenide	GaAs	1.42	direct	Second most common in use after silicon, commonly used as substrate for other III-V semiconductors, e.g. InGaAs and GaInNAs. Brittle. Lower hole mobility than Si, P-type CMOS transistors unfeasible. High impurity density, difficult to fabricate small structures. Used for near-IR LEDs, fast electronics, and high-efficiency solar cells. Very similar lattice constant to germanium, can be grown on germanium substrates.
III-V	2	Gallium antimonide	GaSb	0.73	direct	Used for infrared detectors and LEDs and thermophotovoltaics. Doped n with Te, p with Zn.
III-V	2	Indium nitride	InN	0.7	direct	Possible use in solar cells, but p-type doping difficult. Used frequently as alloys.
III-V	2	Indium phosphide	InP	1.35	direct	Commonly used as substrate for epitaxial InGaAs. Superior electron velocity, used in high-power and high-frequency applications. Used in optoelectronics.
III-V	2	Indium arsenide	InAs	0.36	direct	Used for infrared detectors for 1–3.8 μm, cooled or uncooled. High electron mobility. InAs dots in InGaAs matrix can serve as quantum dots. Quantum dots may be formed from a monolayer of InAs on InP or GaAs. Strong photo-Dember emitter, used as a terahertz radiation source.
III-V	2	Indium antimonide	InSb	0.17	direct	Used in infrared detectors and thermal imaging sensors, high quantum efficiency, low stability, require cooling, used in military long-range thermal imager systems. AlInSb-InSb-AlInSb structure used as quantum well. Very high electron mobility, electron velocity and ballistic length. Transistors can operate below 0.5V and above 200 GHz. Terahertz frequencies maybe achievable.
II-VI	2	Cadmium selenide	CdSe	1.74	direct	Nanoparticles used as quantum dots. Intrinsic n-type, difficult to dope p-type, but can be p-type doped with nitrogen. Possible use in optoelectronics. Tested for high-efficiency solar cells.
II-VI	2	Cadmium sulfide	CdS	2.42	direct	Used in photoresistors and solar cells; CdS/Cu_{2}S was the first efficient solar cell. Used in solar cells with CdTe. Common as quantum dots. Crystals can act as solid-state lasers. Electroluminescent. When doped, can act as a phosphor.
II-VI	2	Cadmium telluride	CdTe	1.49	direct	Used in solar cells with CdS. Used in thin film solar cells and other cadmium telluride photovoltaics; less efficient than crystalline silicon but cheaper. High electro-optic effect, used in electro-optic modulators. Fluorescent at 790 nm. Nanoparticles usable as quantum dots.
II-VI, oxide	2	Zinc oxide	ZnO	3.37	direct	Photocatalytic. Band gap is tunable from 3 to 4 eV by alloying with magnesium oxide and cadmium oxide. Intrinsic n-type, p-type doping is difficult. Heavy aluminium, indium, or gallium doping yields transparent conductive coatings; ZnO:Al is used as window coatings transparent in visible and reflective in infrared region and as conductive films in LCD displays and solar panels as a replacement of indium tin oxide. Resistant to radiation damage. Possible use in LEDs and laser diodes. Possible use in random lasers.
II-VI	2	Zinc selenide	ZnSe	2.7	direct	Used for blue lasers and LEDs. Easy to n-type doping, p-type doping is difficult but can be done with e.g. nitrogen. Common optical material in infrared optics.
II-VI	2	Zinc sulfide	ZnS	3.54/3.91	direct	Band gap 3.54 eV (cubic), 3.91 (hexagonal). Can be doped both n-type and p-type. Common scintillator/phosphor when suitably doped.
II-VI	2	Zinc telluride	ZnTe	2.3	direct	Can be grown on AlSb, GaSb, InAs, and PbSe. Used in solar cells, components of microwave generators, blue LEDs and lasers. Used in electrooptics. Together with lithium niobate used to generate terahertz radiation.
I-VII	2	Cuprous chloride	CuCl	3.4	direct	
I-VI	2	Copper(I) sulfide	Cu_{2}S	1.2	indirect	p-type, Cu_{2}S/CdS was the first efficient thin film solar cell
IV-VI	2	Lead selenide	PbSe	0.26	direct	Used in infrared detectors for thermal imaging. Nanocrystals usable as quantum dots. Good high temperature thermoelectric material.
IV-VI	2	Lead(II) sulfide	PbS	0.37		Mineral galena, first semiconductor in practical use, used in cat's whisker detectors; the detectors are slow due to high dielectric constant of PbS. Oldest material used in infrared detectors. At room temperature can detect SWIR, longer wavelengths require cooling.
IV-VI	2	Lead telluride	PbTe	0.32		Low thermal conductivity, good thermoelectric material at elevated temperature for thermoelectric generators.
IV-VI	2	Tin(II) sulfide	SnS	1.3/1.0	direct/indirect	Tin sulfide (SnS) is a semiconductor with direct optical band gap of 1.3 eV and absorption coefficient above 10^{4} cm^{−1} for photon energies above 1.3 eV. It is a p-type semiconductor whose electrical properties can be tailored by doping and structural modification and has emerged as one of the simple, non-toxic and affordable material for thin film solar cells since a decade.
IV-VI	2	Tin(IV) sulfide	SnS_{2}	2.2		SnS_{2} is widely used in gas sensing applications.
IV-VI	2	Tin telluride	SnTe	0.18	direct	Complex band structure.
V-VI, layered	2	Bismuth telluride	Bi_{2}Te_{3}	0.13		Efficient thermoelectric material near room temperature when alloyed with selenium or antimony. Narrow-gap layered semiconductor. High electrical conductivity, low thermal conductivity. Topological insulator.
II-V	2	Cadmium phosphide	Cd_{3}P_{2}	0.5		
II-V	2	Cadmium arsenide	Cd_{3}As_{2}	0		N-type intrinsic semiconductor. Very high electron mobility. Used in infrared detectors, photodetectors, dynamic thin-film pressure sensors, and magnetoresistors. Recent measurements suggest that 3D Cd_{3}As_{2} is actually a zero band-gap Dirac semimetal in which electrons behave relativistically as in graphene.
II-V	2	Zinc phosphide	Zn_{3}P_{2}	1.5	direct	Usually p-type.
II-V	2	Zinc diphosphide	ZnP_{2}	2.1		
II-V	2	Zinc arsenide	Zn_{3}As_{2}	1.0		The lowest direct and indirect bandgaps are within 30 meV or each other.
II-V	2	Zinc antimonide	Zn_{3}Sb_{2}			Used in infrared detectors and thermal imagers, transistors, and magnetoresistors.
Oxide	2	Titanium dioxide, anatase	TiO_{2}	3.20	indirect	Photocatalytic, n-type
Oxide	2	Titanium dioxide, rutile	TiO_{2}	3.0	direct	Photocatalytic, n-type
Oxide	2	Titanium dioxide, brookite	TiO_{2}	3.26		
Oxide	2	Copper(I) oxide	Cu_{2}O	2.17		One of the most studied semiconductors. Many applications and effects first demonstrated with it. Formerly used in rectifier diodes, before silicon. P-type semiconductor
Oxide	2	Copper(II) oxide	CuO	1.2		N-type semiconductor.
Oxide	2	Uranium dioxide	UO_{2}	1.3		High Seebeck coefficient, resistant to high temperatures, promising thermoelectric and thermophotovoltaic applications. Formerly used in URDOX resistors, conducting at high temperature. Resistant to radiation damage.
Oxide	2	Tin dioxide	SnO_{2}	3.7		Oxygen-deficient n-type semiconductor. Used in gas sensors.
Oxide	3	Barium titanate	BaTiO_{3}	3		Ferroelectric, piezoelectric. Used in some uncooled thermal imagers. Used in nonlinear optics.
Oxide	3	Strontium titanate	SrTiO_{3}	3.3		Ferroelectric, piezoelectric. Used in varistors. Conductive when niobium-doped.
Oxide	3	Lithium niobate	LiNbO_{3}	4		Ferroelectric, piezoelectric, shows Pockels effect. Wide uses in electrooptics and photonics.
Oxide, V-VI	2	monoclinic Vanadium(IV) oxide	VO_{2}	0.7	optical	Stable below 67 °C
Layered	2	Lead(II) iodide	PbI_{2}	2.4		PbI_{2} is a layered direct bandgap semiconductor with bandgap of 2.4 eV in its bulk form, whereas its 2D monolayer has an indirect bandgap of ~2.5 eV, with possibilities to tune the bandgap between 1–3 eV
Layered	2	Molybdenum disulfide	MoS_{2}	1.23 eV (2H)	indirect	
Layered	2	Gallium selenide	GaSe	2.1	indirect	Photoconductor. Uses in nonlinear optics. Used as 2D-material. Air sensitive.
Layered	2	Indium selenide	InSe	1.26–2.35 eV	direct (indirect in 2D)	Air sensitive. High electrical mobility in few- and mono-layer form.
Layered	2	Tin sulfide	SnS	>1.5 eV	direct	
Layered	2	Bismuth sulfide	Bi_{2}S_{3}	1.3		
Magnetic, diluted (DMS)	3	Gallium manganese arsenide	GaMnAs			
Magnetic, diluted (DMS)	3	Lead manganese telluride	PbMnTe			
Magnetic	4	Lanthanum calcium manganate	La_{0.7}Ca_{0.3}MnO_{3}			Colossal magnetoresistance
Magnetic	2	Iron(II) oxide	FeO	2.2		Antiferromagnetic. Band gap for iron oxide nanoparticles was found to be 2.2 eV and on doping the band gap found to be increased up to 2.5 eV
Magnetic	2	Nickel(II) oxide	NiO	3.6–4.0	direct	Antiferromagnetic
Magnetic	2	Europium(II) oxide	EuO			Ferromagnetic
Magnetic	2	Europium(II) sulfide	EuS			Ferromagnetic
Magnetic	2	Chromium(III) bromide	CrBr_{3}			
other	3	Copper indium selenide, CIS	CuInSe_{2}	1	direct	
other	3	Silver gallium sulfide	AgGaS_{2}			Nonlinear optical properties
other	3	Zinc silicon phosphide	ZnSiP_{2}	2.0		
other	2	Arsenic trisulfide Orpiment	As_{2}S_{3}	2.7	direct	Semiconductive in both crystalline and glassy state
other	2	Arsenic sulfide Realgar	As_{4}S_{4}			Semiconductive in both crystalline and glassy state
other	2	Platinum silicide	PtSi			Used in infrared detectors for 1–5 μm. Used in infrared astronomy. High stability, low drift, used for measurements. Low quantum efficiency.
other	2	Bismuth(III) iodide	BiI_{3}			
other	2	Mercury(II) iodide	HgI_{2}			Used in some gamma-ray and x-ray detectors and imaging systems operating at room temperature.
other	2	Thallium(I) bromide	TlBr	2.68		Used in some gamma-ray and x-ray detectors and imaging systems operating at room temperature. Used as a real-time x-ray image sensor.
other	2	Silver sulfide	Ag_{2}S	0.9		
other	2	Iron disulfide	FeS_{2}	0.95		Mineral pyrite. Used in later cat's whisker detectors, investigated for solar cells.
other	4	Copper zinc tin sulfide, CZTS	Cu_{2}ZnSnS_{4}	1.49	direct	Cu_{2}ZnSnS_{4} is derived from CIGS, replacing the Indium/Gallium with earth abundant Zinc/Tin.
other	4	Copper zinc antimony sulfide, CZAS	Cu_{1.18}Zn_{0.40}Sb_{1.90}S_{7.2}	2.2	direct	Copper zinc antimony sulfide is derived from copper antimony sulfide (CAS), a famatinite class of compound.
other	3	Copper tin sulfide, CTS	Cu_{2}SnS_{3}	0.91	direct	Cu_{2}SnS_{3} is p-type semiconductor and it can be used in thin film solar cell application.

== Table of semiconductor alloy systems ==
The following semiconducting systems can be tuned to some extent, and represent not a single material but a class of materials.

Group	Elem.	Material class	Formula	Band gap (eV)		Gap type	Description
Group	Elem.	Material class	Formula	Lower	Upper	Gap type	Description
IV-VI	3	Lead tin telluride	Pb_{1−x}Sn_{x}Te	0	0.29		Used in infrared detectors and for thermal imaging
IV	2	Silicon-germanium	Si_{1−x}Ge_{x}	0.67	1.11	direct/indirect	Adjustable band gap, allows construction of heterojunction structures. Certain thicknesses of superlattices have direct band gap.
IV	2	Silicon-tin	Si_{1−x}Sn_{x}	1.0	1.11	indirect	Adjustable band gap.
III-V	3	Aluminium gallium arsenide	Al_{x}Ga_{1−x}As	1.42	2.16	direct/indirect	Direct band gap for x<0.4 (corresponding to 1.42–1.95 eV); can be lattice-matched to GaAs substrate over entire composition range; tends to oxidize; n-doping with Si, Se, Te; p-doping with Zn, C, Be, Mg. Can be used for infrared laser diodes. Used as a barrier layer in GaAs devices to confine electrons to GaAs (see e.g. QWIP). AlGaAs with composition close to AlAs is almost transparent to sunlight. Used in GaAs/AlGaAs solar cells.
III-V	3	Indium gallium arsenide	In_{x}Ga_{1−x}As	0.36	1.43	direct	Well-developed material. Can be lattice matched to InP substrates. Use in infrared technology and thermophotovoltaics. Indium content determines charge carrier density. For x=0.015, InGaAs perfectly lattice-matches germanium; can be used in multijunction photovoltaic cells. Used in infrared sensors, avalanche photodiodes, laser diodes, optical fiber communication detectors, and short-wavelength infrared cameras.
III-V	3	Indium gallium phosphide	In_{x}Ga_{1−x}P	1.35	2.26	direct/indirect	Used for HEMT and HBT structures and high-efficiency multijunction solar cells for e.g. satellites. Ga_{0.5}In_{0.5}P is almost lattice-matched to GaAs, with AlGaIn used for quantum wells for red lasers.
III-V	3	Aluminium indium arsenide	Al_{x}In_{1−x}As	0.36	2.16	direct/indirect	Buffer layer in metamorphic HEMT transistors, adjusting lattice constant between GaAs substrate and GaInAs channel. Can form layered heterostructures acting as quantum wells, in e.g. quantum cascade lasers.
III-V	3	Aluminium gallium antimonide	Al_{x}Ga_{1−x}Sb	0.7	1.61	direct/indirect	Used in HBTs, HEMTs, resonant-tunneling diodes and some niche optoelectronics. Also used as a buffer layer for InAs quantum wells.
III-V	3	Aluminium indium antimonide	Al_{x}In_{1−x}Sb	0.17	1.61	direct/indirect	Used as a buffer layer in InSb-based quantum wells and other devices grown on GaAs and GaSb substrates. Also used as the active layer in some mid-infrared LEDs and photodiodes.
III-V	3	Gallium arsenide nitride	GaAsN				
III-V	3	Gallium arsenide phosphide	GaAsP	1.43	2.26	direct/indirect	Used in red, orange and yellow LEDs. Often grown on GaP. Can be doped with nitrogen.
III-V	3	Aluminium arsenide antimonide	AlAsSb	1.61	2.16	indirect	Used as a barrier layer in infrared photodetectors. Can be lattice matched to GaSb, InAs and InP.
III-V	3	Gallium arsenide antimonide	GaAsSb	0.7	1.42	direct	Used in HBTs and in tunnel junctions in multi-junction solar cells. GaAs_{0.51}Sb_{0.49} is lattice matched to InP.
III-V	3	Aluminium gallium nitride	AlGaN	3.44	6.28	direct	Used in blue laser diodes, ultraviolet LEDs (down to 250 nm), and AlGaN/GaN HEMTs. Can be grown on sapphire. Used in heterojunctions with AlN and GaN.
III-V	3	Aluminium gallium phosphide	AlGaP	2.26	2.45	indirect	Used in some green LEDs.
III-V	3	Indium gallium nitride	InGaN	2	3.4	direct	In_{x}Ga_{1–x}N, x usually between 0.02 and 0.3 (0.02 for near-UV, 0.1 for 390 nm, 0.2 for 420 nm, 0.3 for 440 nm). Can be grown epitaxially on sapphire, SiC wafers or silicon. Used in modern blue and green LEDs, InGaN quantum wells are effective emitters from green to ultraviolet. Insensitive to radiation damage, possible use in satellite solar cells. Insensitive to defects, tolerant to lattice mismatch damage. High heat capacity.
III-V	3	Indium arsenide antimonide	InAsSb	0.17	0.36	direct	Primarily used in mid- and long-wave infrared photodetectors due to its small bandgap, which reaches a minimum of around 0.08 eV in InAs_{0.4}Sb_{0.6} at room temperature.
III-V	3	Indium gallium antimonide	InGaSb	0.17	0.7	direct	Used in some transistors and infrared photodetectors.
III-V	4	Aluminium gallium indium phosphide	AlGaInP			direct/indirect	Also InAlGaP, InGaAlP, AlInGaP; for lattice matching to GaAs substrates the In mole fraction is fixed at about 0.48, the Al/Ga ratio is adjusted to achieve band gaps between about 1.9 and 2.35 eV; direct or indirect band gaps depending on the Al/Ga/In ratios; used for wavelengths between 560 and 650 nm; tends to form ordered phases during deposition, which has to be prevented
III-V	4	Aluminium gallium arsenide phosphide	AlGaAsP				
III-V	4	Indium gallium arsenide phosphide	InGaAsP				
III-V	4	Indium gallium arsenide antimonide	InGaAsSb				Use in thermophotovoltaics.
III-V	4	Indium arsenide antimonide phosphide	InAsSbP				Use in thermophotovoltaics.
III-V	4	Aluminium indium arsenide phosphide	AlInAsP				
III-V	4	Aluminium gallium arsenide nitride	AlGaAsN				
III-V	4	Indium gallium arsenide nitride	InGaAsN				
III-V	4	Indium aluminium arsenide nitride	InAlAsN				
III-V	4	Gallium arsenide antimonide nitride	GaAsSbN				
III-V	5	Gallium indium nitride arsenide antimonide	GaInNAsSb				
III-V	5	Gallium indium arsenide antimonide phosphide	GaInAsSbP				Can be grown on InAs, GaSb, and other substrates. Can be lattice matched by varying composition. Possibly usable for mid-infrared LEDs.
II-VI	3	Cadmium zinc telluride, CZT	CdZnTe	1.4	2.2	direct	Efficient solid-state x-ray and gamma-ray detector, can operate at room temperature. High electro-optic coefficient. Used in solar cells. Can be used to generate and detect terahertz radiation. Can be used as a substrate for epitaxial growth of HgCdTe.
II-VI	3	Mercury cadmium telluride	HgCdTe	0	1.5		Known as "MerCad". Extensive use in sensitive cooled infrared imaging sensors, infrared astronomy, and infrared detectors. Alloy of mercury telluride (a semimetal, zero band gap) and CdTe. High electron mobility. The only common material capable of operating in both 3–5 μm and 12–15 μm atmospheric windows. Can be grown on CdZnTe.
II-VI	3	Mercury zinc telluride	HgZnTe	0	2.25		Used in infrared detectors, infrared imaging sensors, and infrared astronomy. Better mechanical and thermal properties than HgCdTe but more difficult to control the composition. More difficult to form complex heterostructures.
II-VI	3	Mercury zinc selenide	HgZnSe				
II-V	4	Zinc cadmium phosphide arsenide	(Zn_{1−x}Cd_{x})_{3}(P_{1−y}As_{y})_{2}	0	1.5		Various applications in optoelectronics (incl. photovoltaics), electronics and thermoelectrics.
other	4	Copper indium gallium selenide, CIGS	Cu(In,Ga)Se_{2}	1	1.7	direct	CuIn_{x}Ga_{1–x}Se_{2}. Polycrystalline. Used in thin film solar cells.

== See also ==
- Heterojunction
- Organic semiconductors
- Outline of semiconductors
- Semiconductor characterization techniques
