= Aluminium gallium antimonide =

Aluminium gallium antimonide, also known as gallium aluminium antimonide or AlGaSb (Al_{x}Ga_{1-x}Sb), is a ternary III-V semiconductor compound. It can be considered as an alloy between aluminium antimonide and gallium antimonide. The alloy can contain any ratio between aluminium and gallium. AlGaSb refers generally to any composition of the alloy.

== Preparation ==
AlGaSb films have been grown by molecular beam epitaxy, chemical beam epitaxy and liquid phase epitaxy on gallium arsenide and gallium antimonide substrates. The result is a layered heterostructure on various III-V compounds.

== Electronic properties ==
Dependence of the direct and indirect band gaps of AlGaSb on composition at room temperature (T = 300 K). Based on these recommended empirical relationships, the transition from a direct (Γ–Γ) to indirect (Γ–X) gap occurs at x = 0.43.

The bandgap and lattice constant of AlGaSb alloys are between those of pure AlSb (a = 0.614 nm, E_{g} = 1.62 eV) and GaSb (a = 0.610 nm, E_{g} = 0.73 eV). At an intermediate composition, the bandgap transitions from an indirect gap, like that of pure AlSb, to a direct gap, like that of pure GaSb. Different values of the composition at which this transition occurs have been reported over time, both from computational and experimental studies, with reported values ranging from x = 0.23 to x = 0.43. The spread in the reported values of the transition is mainly due to the closeness of the gap sizes at the Γ and L points in the Brillouin zone and variations in the experimentally-determined gap sizes.

== Applications ==
AlGaSb has been incorporated into devices such as heterojunction bipolar and high-electron-mobility transistors, resonant-tunneling diodes, solar cells, short-wave infrared lasers, and a novel infrared light modulator. It is sometimes selected as an interlayer or buffer layer in studies of GaSb and InAs quantum wells.

Al-rich AlGaSb is sometimes selected over AlSb in heterostructures for being more chemically stable and resistant to oxidation than pure AlSb.
