= Gallium arsenide antimonide =

Identifiers
3D model (JSmol)	GaAs_{0.5}Sb_{0.5}: Interactive image
- InChI: InChI=1S/AsH2.2Ga.Sb.6H/h1H2;;;;;;;;; Key: MIEVXBWDYAIMDS-UHFFFAOYSA-N
- SMILES: GaAs_{0.5}Sb_{0.5}: [Ga].[Ga].[As].[Sb]

Related compounds
Related compounds	Gallium arsenide; Gallium antimonide; Gallium indium arsenide antimonide phosphide
- Except where otherwise noted, data are given for materials in their standard state (at 25 °C [77 °F], 100 kPa). Infobox references

Gallium arsenide antimonide, also known as gallium antimonide arsenide or GaAsSb (GaAs_{(1-x)}Sb_{x}), is a ternary III-V semiconductor compound; x indicates the fractions of arsenic and antimony in the alloy. GaAsSb refers generally to any composition of the alloy. It is an alloy of gallium arsenide (GaAs) and gallium antimonide (GaSb).

== Preparation ==
GaAsSb films have been grown by molecular beam epitaxy (MBE), metalorganic vapor phase epitaxy (MOVPE) and liquid phase epitaxy (LPE) on gallium arsenide, gallium antimonide and indium phosphide substrates. It is often incorporated into layered heterostructures with other III-V compounds.

=== Thermodynamic Stability ===
GaAsSb has a miscibility gap at temperatures below 751 °C. This means that intermediate compositions of the alloy below this temperature are thermodynamically unstable and can spontaneously separate into two phases: one GaAs-rich and one GaSb-rich. This limits the compositions of GaAsSb that can be obtained by near-equilibrium growth techniques, such as LPE, to those outside of the miscibility gap. However, compositions of GaAsSb within the miscibility gap can be obtained with non-equilibrium growth techniques, such as MBE and MOVPE. By carefully selecting the growth conditions (e.g., the ratios of precursor gases in MOVPE) and maintaining relatively low temperatures during and after growth, it is possible to obtain compositions of GaAsSb within the miscibility gap that are kinetically stable. For example, this makes it possible to grow GaAsSb with the composition GaAs_{0.51}Sb_{0.49}, which, while normally within the miscibility gap at typical growth temperatures, can exist as a kinetically stable alloy. This composition of GaAsSb is latticed matched to InP and is sometimes used in heterostructures grown on that substrate.

== Electronic Properties ==
Direct bandgap versus composition for GaAsSb.

The bandgap and lattice constant of GaAsSb alloys are between those of pure GaAs (a = 0.565 nm, E_{g} = 1.42 eV) and GaSb (a = 0.610 nm, E_{g} = 0.73 eV). Over all compositions, the band gap is direct, like in GaAs and GaSb. Furthermore, the bandgap displays a minimum in composition at approximately x = 0.8 at T = 300 K, reaching a minimum value of E_{g} = 0.67 eV, which is slightly below that of pure GaSb.

== Applications ==
GaAsSb has been extensively studied for use in heterojunction bipolar transistors. It has also been lattice-matched with InGaAs on InP to create and study a two-dimensional electron gas.

A GaAsSb/GaAs-based heterostructure was used to make a near-infrared photodiode with peak responsivity centered at 1.3 μm.

GaAsSb can be incorporated into III-V–based multi-junction solar cells to reduce the tunneling distance and increase the tunneling current between adjacent cells.
