= Indium arsenide antimonide phosphide =

Indium arsenide antimonide phosphide (InAsSbP) is a semiconductor material.

InAsSbP has been used as blocking layers for semiconductor laser structures, as well as for the mid-infrared light-emitting diodes and lasers, photodetectors and thermophotovoltaic cells.

InAsSbP layers can be grown by heteroepitaxy on indium arsenide, gallium antimonide and other materials.

== See also ==
- Aluminium gallium indium phosphide
- Gallium indium arsenide antimonide phosphide
