= Gallium indium arsenide antimonide phosphide =

Semiconductor material

Gallium indium arsenide antimonide phosphide (GaInAsSbP or GaInPAsSb) is a semiconductor material.

Research has shown that GaInAsSbP can be used in the manufacture of mid-infrared light-emitting diodes and thermophotovoltaic cells.

GaInAsSbP layers can be grown by heteroepitaxy on indium arsenide, gallium antimonide and other materials. The exact composition can be tuned in order to make it lattice matched. The presence of five elements in the alloy allows extra degrees of freedom, making it possible to fix the lattice constant while varying the bandgap. E.g. Ga_{0.92}In_{0.08}P_{0.05}As_{0.08}Sb_{0.87} is lattice matched to InAs.

== See also ==
- Aluminium gallium phosphide
- Aluminium gallium indium phosphide
- Indium gallium arsenide phosphide
- Indium arsenide antimonide phosphide
- Indium gallium arsenide antimonide
