= Gallium indium antimonide =

Ternary III-V Semiconductor compound

Gallium indium antimonide, also known as indium gallium antimonide, GaInSb, or InGaSb (Ga_{x}In_{1−x}Sb), is a ternary III–V semiconductor compound. It can be considered as an alloy between gallium antimonide and indium antimonide. The alloy can contain any ratio between gallium and indium. GaInSb refers generally to any composition of the alloy.

== Preparation ==
GaInSb films have been grown by molecular beam epitaxy, chemical beam epitaxy and liquid phase epitaxy on gallium arsenide and gallium antimonide substrates. It is often incorporated into layered heterostructures with other III–V compounds.

== Electronic properties ==
Dependence of the direct and indirect band gaps of GaInSb on composition at room temperature (T = 300 K)

The bandgap and lattice constant of GaInSb alloys are between those of pure GaSb (a = 0.610 nm, E_{g} = 0.73 eV) and InSb (a = 0.648 nm, E_{g} = 0.17 eV). Over all compositions, the bandgap is direct, like in pure GaSb and InSb.

== Applications ==
InGaSb and InGaSb-containing heterostructures have been studied for use in near- to mid-infrared photodetectors, transistors, and Hall-effect sensors.
