= Gallium arsenide phosphide =

Semiconductor alloy

Gallium arsenide phosphide (GaAs_{1−x}P_{x}) is a semiconductor material, an alloy of gallium arsenide and gallium phosphide. It exists in various composition ratios indicated in its formula by the fraction x.

Gallium arsenide phosphide is used for manufacturing red, orange and yellow light-emitting diodes. It is often grown on gallium phosphide substrates to form a GaP/GaAsP heterostructure. In order to tune its electronic properties, it may be doped with nitrogen (GaAsP:N).

== See also ==
- Gallium arsenide
- Gallium indium arsenide antimonide phosphide
- Gallium phosphide
- Indium gallium arsenide phosphide
- Indium gallium phosphide
