= LED controller =

Electronic device that operates an LED

- Short name: LEDC
- Other name: LED lighting controller
- Full name: Light-emitting diode controller
- Type: Module-based LED control device
- Main function: Regulation of the luminance of the LED

An LED controller (short for light-emitting diode controller), also known as LED lighting controller, or simply referred to as LEDC, is an electronic device that operates an LED. Its basic functions are to regulate the current and voltage fed to the LED, as well as its light-emitting pattern, brightness and color. The device is different from an LED driver.

An LED controller, which has up to 16 channels, is a light controller equipped with an LED driver. The device has all the control capabilities of the generic LED driver with additional features including communication and temperature monitoring.

LEDCs can be categorized into various types, such as Wi-Fi LED controllers, Bluetooth LED controllers, DALI and DMX LED controllers. The units can be used in the fields of automotive lighting, bicycle lighting, and residential lighting. The representative manufacturers of such devices include Analog Devices, MiBoxer, and Texas Instruments.

== History ==
The LT3756, launched by Linear Technology in 2008, is one of the early LED controllers. In 2012, TI introduced the industry's first LEDC with constant power regulation.

In March 2014, Marvell Technology rolled out the 88EM8189, which is touted as the smart AC/DC LED controller that offers I²C control interface.
