= Zinc antimonide =

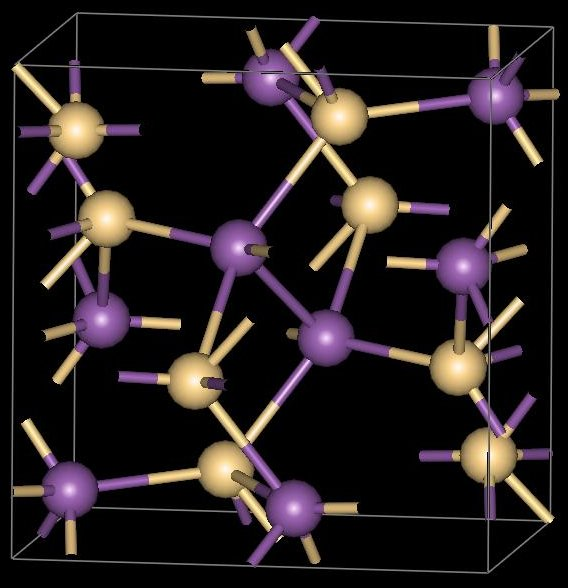

Names
- IUPAC name Zinc antimonide

Identifiers
CAS Number	12039-35-9 ZnSb
3D model (JSmol)	Interactive image
ECHA InfoCard	100.031.708
EC Number	234-893-5 (ZnSb)
PubChem CID	6336886 ZnSb; 117064435 Zn_{4}Sb_{3}
UN number	1459
CompTox Dashboard (EPA)	DTXSID2065206
- InChI: InChI=1S/3Sb.4Zn/q;;;;3*+2 Key: JVDDZZNIYDFBAH-UHFFFAOYSA-N
- SMILES: [Zn].[Zn+2].[Zn+2].[Zn+2].[Sb].[Sb].[Sb]

Properties
Chemical formula	ZnSb, Zn_{3}Sb_{2}, Zn_{4}Sb_{3}
Molar mass	434.06 g/mol
Appearance	silver-white orthorhombic crystals
Density	6.33 g/cm^{3}
Melting point	546 °C (1,015 °F; 819 K) (565 °C, 563 °C)
Solubility in water	reacts
Band gap	0.52 eV (ZnSb, indirect), 0.89 eV (ZnSb, direct), 1.07eV (Zn_{4}Sb_{3}, direct)

Structure
Crystal structure	Orthorhombic, oP16
Space group	Pbca, No. 61

Hazards
- GHS labelling
Pictograms	(GHS06: Toxic) (GHS09: Environmental hazard)
Signal word	Danger
Hazard statements	H302, H331, H410
Precautionary statements	P261, P273, P311, P501
- Except where otherwise noted, data are given for materials in their standard state (at 25 °C [77 °F], 100 kPa). verify (what is ?) Infobox references

Zinc antimonide (ZnSb), (Zn_{3}Sb_{2}), (Zn_{4}Sb_{3}) is an inorganic chemical compound. The Zn-Sb system contains six intermetallics. Like indium antimonide, aluminium antimonide, and gallium antimonide, it is a semiconducting intermetallic compound. It is used in transistors, infrared detectors and thermal imagers, as well as magnetoresistive devices.

== History of zinc–antimony alloys and zinc antimonide ==
The first reported use of zinc-antimony alloys was in the original work of T. J. Seebeck on thermoelectricity, a scientist who would then give his name to the Seebeck effect. By the 1860s, Moses G. Farmer, an American inventor, had developed the first high powered thermoelectric generator based on using a zinc-antimony alloy with a composition very close to stoichiometric ZnSb. He showed this generator at the 1867 Paris Exposition where it was carefully studied and copied (with minor modifications) by a number of people including Clamond. Farmer finally received the patent on his generator in 1870. George H. Cove patented a thermoelectric generator based on a Zn-Sb alloy in the early 1900s. His patent claimed that the voltage and current for six "joints" was 3V at 3A. This was a far higher output than would be expected from a thermoelectric couple, and was possibly the first demonstration of the thermophotovoltaic effect, as the bandgap for ZnSb is 0.56eV, which under ideal conditions could yield close to 0.5V per diode. The next researcher to work with the material was Mária Telkes while she was at Westinghouse in Pittsburgh during the 1930s. Interest was revived again with the discovery of the higher bandgap Zn_{4}Sb_{3} material in the 1990s. The temperature-dependent optical indirect band gap of ZnSb was measured in 1964 using thin bulk crystals. Direct and indirect band gaps were accurately determined for thin film ZnSb and Zn_{4}Sb_{3} in 2023.
