= Indium gallium arsenide phosphide =

Alloy

Indium gallium arsenide phosphide (Ga_{x}In_{1−x}As_{y}P_{1−y}) is a quaternary compound semiconductor material, an alloy of gallium arsenide, gallium phosphide, indium arsenide, or indium phosphide. This compound has applications in photonic devices, due to the ability to tailor its band gap via changes in the alloy mole ratios, x and y.

Indium phosphide-based photonic integrated circuits, or PICs, commonly use alloys of Ga_{x}In_{1−x}As_{y}P_{1−y} to construct quantum wells, waveguides and other photonic structures, lattice matched to an InP substrate, enabling single-crystal epitaxial growth onto InP.

Many devices operating in the near-infrared 1.55 μm wavelength window utilize this alloy, and are employed as optical components (such as laser transmitters, photodetectors and modulators) in C-band communications systems.

Fraunhofer Institute for Solar Energy Systems ISE reported a triple-junction solar cell utilizing Ga_{0.93}In_{0.07}As_{0.87}P_{0.13}. The cell has very high efficiency of 35.9% (claimed to be a record).

== See also ==
- Indium gallium phosphide
- Gallium indium arsenide antimonide phosphide
- Solar cell efficiency
