= Copper zinc antimony sulfide =

Copper zinc antimony sulfide is a semiconductor.
