= Indium gallium phosphide =

Semiconductor

Indium gallium phosphide (InGaP), also called gallium indium phosphide (GaInP), is a semiconductor composed of indium, gallium and phosphorus. It is used in high-power and high-frequency electronics because of its superior electron velocity with respect to the more common semiconductors silicon and gallium arsenide.

It is used mainly in HEMT and HBT structures, but also for the fabrication of high efficiency solar cells used for space applications and, in combination with aluminium (AlGaInP alloy) to make high brightness LEDs with orange-red, orange, yellow, and green colors. Some semiconductor devices such as EFluor Nanocrystal use InGaP as their core particle.

Indium gallium phosphide is a solid solution of indium phosphide and gallium phosphide.

Ga_{0.5}In_{0.5}P is a solid solution of special importance, which is almost lattice matched to GaAs. This allows, in combination with (Al_{x}Ga_{1−x})_{0.5}In_{0.5}, the growth of lattice matched quantum wells for red emitting semiconductor lasers, e.g., red emitting (650nm) RCLEDs or VCSELs for PMMA plastic optical fibers.

Ga_{0.5}In_{0.5}P is used as the high energy junction on double and triple junction photovoltaic cells grown on GaAs. Recent years have shown GaInP/GaAs tandem solar cells with AM0 (sunlight incidence in space = 1.35 kW/m^{2}) efficiencies in excess of 25%.

A different composition of GaInP, lattice matched to the underlying GaInAs, is utilized as the high energy junction GaInP/GaInAs/Ge triple junction photovoltaic cells.

Growth of GaInP by epitaxy can be complicated by the tendency of GaInP to grow as an ordered material, rather than a truly random solid solution (i.e., a mixture). This changes the bandgap and the electronic and optical properties of the material.

== See also ==
- Gallium phosphide
- Indium(III) phosphide
- Indium gallium nitride
- Indium gallium arsenide
- Multi-junction solar cells – Solar cells that often use InGaP
