= Free carrier absorption =

Free carrier absorption occurs when a material absorbs a photon, and a carrier (electron or hole) is excited from an already-excited state to another, unoccupied state in the same band (but possibly a different subband). This intraband absorption is different from interband absorption because the excited carrier is already in an excited band, such as an electron in the conduction band or a hole in the valence band, where it is free to move. In interband absorption, the carrier starts in a fixed, nonconducting band and is excited to a conducting one.

In the simplest approximation, the Drude model, free carrier absorption is proportional to the square of the wavelength.

== Quantum mechanical approach ==
It is well known that the optical transition of electrons and holes in the solid state is a useful clue to understand the physical properties of the material. However, the dynamics of the carriers are affected by other carriers and not only by the periodic lattice potential. Moreover, the thermal fluctuation of each electron should be taken into account. Therefore, a statistical approach is needed. To predict the optical transition with appropriate precision, one chooses an approximation, called the assumption of quasi-thermal distributions, of the electrons in the conduction band and of the holes in the valence band. In this case, the diagonal components of the density matrix become negligible after introducing the thermal distribution function,

$$\rho _{\lambda \lambda }^0  = \frac{1}{{e^{(\varepsilon _{\lambda ,k}  - \mu )\beta }  + 1}} = f_{\lambda ,k}$$

This is the Fermi–Dirac distribution for the distribution of electron energies $\varepsilon$. Thus, summing over all possible states (l and k) yields the total number of carriers N.

$$N_\lambda   = \sum\limits_\lambda  {f_{\lambda ,k}}$$

=== The optical susceptibility ===
Using the above distribution function, the time evolution of the density matrix can be ignored, which greatly simplifies the analysis.

$$\rho _{cv}^{{\mathop{\rm int}} } (k,t) = \int {\frac{{d\omega }}{{2\pi }}\frac{{d_{cv} \varepsilon (\omega )e^{i(\varepsilon _{c,k}  - \varepsilon _{v,k}  - \omega )t} }}{{\hbar (\varepsilon _{c,k} - \varepsilon _{v,k} - \omega  - i\gamma )}}(f_{v,k}  - f_{c,k} )}$$

The optical polarization is

$$P(t) = \text{tr}[\rho (t)d]$$

With this relation and after adjusting the Fourier transformation, the optical susceptibility is

$$\chi (\omega ) =  - \sum\limits_k {\frac{{\left| {d_{cv} } \right|^{_2 } }}{{L^3 }}} (f_{v,k} - f_{c,k})\left( {\frac{1}{{\hbar (\varepsilon _{v,k} - \varepsilon _{c,k}+ \omega  + i\gamma )}} - \frac{1}{{\hbar (\varepsilon _{c,k}  - \varepsilon _{v,k}  + \omega  + i\gamma )}}} \right)$$

=== Absorption coefficient ===
The transition amplitude corresponds to the absorption of energy and the absorbed energy is proportional to the optical conductivity which is the imaginary part of the optical susceptibility after frequency is multiplied. Therefore, in order to obtain the absorption coefficient that is crucial quantity for investigation of electronic structure, we can use the optical susceptibility.

$$\begin{aligned}
\alpha (\omega ) &= \frac{{4\pi \omega }}{{n_b c}}\chi ''(\omega )\\
&= \frac{{4\pi \omega }}{{n_b c}}\sum\limits_k {\left| {d_{cv} } \right|^2 (f_{v,k}  - f_{c,k} )\delta (\hbar (\varepsilon _{v,k}  - \varepsilon _{c,k}  + \omega ))}
\end{aligned}$$

The energy of free carriers is proportional to the square of momentum ($E\sim k^2$). Using the band gap energy $E_g$ and the electron-hole distribution function, we can obtain the absorption coefficient with some mathematical calculation. The final result is

$$\alpha (\omega ) = \alpha _0^d \frac{{\hbar \omega }}{{E_0 }}\left( {\frac{{\hbar \omega  - E_g  - E_0^{(d)} }}{{E_0 }}} \right)^{(d - 2)/2} \sum\limits_k {\Theta (\hbar \omega  - E_g  - E_0^{(d)} )A(\omega )}$$

This result is important to understand the optical measurement data and the electronic properties of metals and semiconductors. The absorption coefficient is negative when the material supports stimulated emission, which is the basis for the operation of lasers, particularly semiconductor laser.
