= Aluminium gallium indium phosphide =

Semiconductor material

Identifiers
CAS Number	163207-18-9
3D model (JSmol)	Al:Ga:In = 1:1:1: Interactive image
PubChem CID	Al:Ga:In = 1:1:1: 21871730
- InChI: Al:Ga:In = 1:1:1: InChI=1S/Al.Ga.In.3P/q3*+3;3*-3 Key: LWRKRICXHHSDPR-UHFFFAOYSA-N
- SMILES: Al:Ga:In = 1:1:1: [Al+3].[Ga+3].[In+3].[P-3].[P-3].[P-3]

Properties
Chemical formula	AlGaInP

Structure
Crystal structure	Cubic
- Except where otherwise noted, data are given for materials in their standard state (at 25 °C [77 °F], 100 kPa). Infobox references

Aluminium gallium indium phosphide (AlGaInP, also AlInGaP, InGaAlP, etc.) is a semiconductor material that provides a platform for the development of multi-junction photovoltaics and optoelectronic devices. It has a direct bandgap ranging from ultraviolet to infrared photon energies.

AlGaInP is used in heterostructures for high-brightness red, orange, green, and yellow light-emitting diodes. It is also used to make diode lasers.

== Preparation ==
AlGaInP is typically grown by heteroepitaxy on gallium arsenide or gallium phosphide substrates in order to form a quantum well structure that can be fabricated into different devices.

== Properties ==
Optical properties
Refractive index	3.49
Chromatic dispersion	-1.68 μm^{−1}
Absorption coefficient	50536 cm^{−1}

The direct bandgap of AlGaInP encompasses the energy range of visible light (1.7 eV - 3.1 eV). By selecting a specific composition of AlGaInP, the bandgap can be selected to correspond to the energy of a specific wavelength of visible light. For instance, this can be used to obtain LEDs that emit red, orange, or yellow light.

Like most other III-V semiconductors and their alloys, AlGaInP possesses a zincblende crystal structure.

== Applications ==
AlGaInP is used as the active material in:

- Light emitting diodes of high brightness
- Diode lasers
- Quantum well structures
- Solar cells (potential). The use of aluminium gallium indium phosphide with high aluminium content, in a five junction structure, can lead to solar cells with maximum theoretical efficiencies above 40%.

AlGaInP is frequently used in LEDs for lighting systems, along with indium gallium nitride (InGaN).

=== Diode laser ===
A diode laser consists of a semiconductor material in which a p-n junction forms the active medium and optical feedback is typically provided by reflections at the device facets. AlGaInP diode lasers emit visible and near-infrared light with wavelengths of 0.63-0.76 μm. The primary applications of AlGaInP diode lasers are in optical disc readers, laser pointers, and gas sensors, as well as for optical pumping, and machining.

== Safety and toxicity aspects ==
The toxicology of AlGaInP has not been fully investigated. The dust is an irritant to skin, eyes and lungs. The environment, health and safety aspects of aluminium indium gallium phosphide sources (such as trimethylgallium, trimethylindium and phosphine) and industrial hygiene monitoring studies of standard MOVPE sources have been reported in a review.

== See also ==
- Indium phosphide
- Indium gallium phosphide
- Aluminium gallium phosphide
- Indium gallium arsenide phosphide
