= Aluminium gallium phosphide =

Aluminium gallium phosphide, (Al,Ga)P, a phosphide of aluminium and gallium, is a semiconductor material. It is an alloy of aluminium phosphide and gallium phosphide. It is used to manufacture light-emitting diodes emitting green light.

== See also ==
- Aluminium gallium indium phosphide
