= Aluminium antimonide =

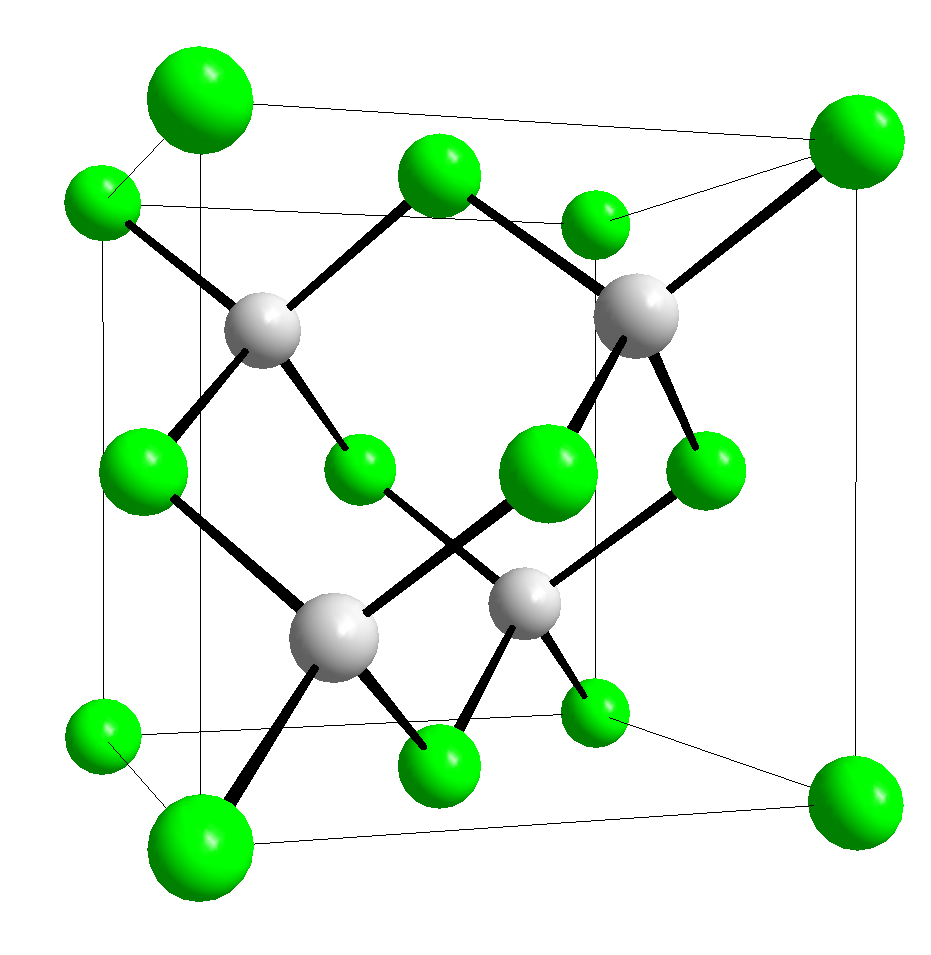

Identifiers
CAS Number	25152-52-7
3D model (JSmol)	Interactive image
ChemSpider	82452
ECHA InfoCard	100.042.410
EC Number	246-667-3
PubChem CID	91307
UNII	5YY752FD6D
CompTox Dashboard (EPA)	DTXSID9067061
- InChI: InChI=1S/Al.Sb Key: LVQULNGDVIKLPK-UHFFFAOYSA-N; InChI=1/Al.Sb/rAlSb/c1-2 Key: LVQULNGDVIKLPK-XFZGNPHIAJ
- SMILES: [SbH+]12[Al-][SbH+]3[Al-][SbH+]([AlH-]14)[AlH-]1[Sb+]5([AlH-]38)[Al-]26[SbH+]2[AlH-]([Sb+]4)[SbH+]1[Al-][SbH+]3[AlH-]2[Sb+][AlH-]([SbH+]6[AlH-]([SbH+])[SbH+]68)[SbH+]([Al-]6)[AlH-]35

Properties
Chemical formula	AlSb
Molar mass	148.742 g/mol
Appearance	black crystals
Density	4.26 g/cm^{3}
Melting point	1,060 °C (1,940 °F; 1,330 K)
Boiling point	2,467 °C (4,473 °F; 2,740 K)
Solubility in water	insoluble
Band gap	1.58 eV
Refractive index (n_{D})	3.3

Structure
Crystal structure	Zinc blende
Space group	T^{2}_{d}-F-43m
Coordination geometry	Tetrahedral

Thermochemistry
Std molar entropy (S^{⦵}_{298})	65 J/mol K
Std enthalpy of formation (Δ_{f}H^{⦵}_{298})	−50.4 kJ/mol

Hazards
NFPA 704 (fire diamond)	0 3 1
Autoignition temperature	317 °C (603 °F; 590 K)
Safety data sheet (SDS)	MSDS
- Except where otherwise noted, data are given for materials in their standard state (at 25 °C [77 °F], 100 kPa). verify (what is ?) Infobox references

Aluminium antimonide (AlSb) is a semiconductor of the group III-V family containing aluminium and antimony. The lattice constant is 0.61 nm. The indirect bandgap is approximately 1.6 eV at 300 K, whereas the direct band gap is 2.22 eV.

Its electron mobility is 200 cm^{2}·V^{−1}·s^{−1} and hole mobility 400 cm^{2}·V^{−1}·s^{−1} at 300 K. Its refractive index is 3.3 at a wavelength of 2 μm, and its dielectric constant is 10.9 at microwave frequencies.

AlSb can be reacted with other III-V materials to produce ternary materials including AlInSb, AlGaSb and AlAsSb.

Aluminium antimonide is rather flammable because of the reducing tendency of the antimonide (Sb^{3−}) ion. It burns to produce aluminium oxide and antimony trioxide.

== See also ==
- Gallium antimonide
- Indium antimonide
- Aluminium arsenide
