= Gallium phosphide =

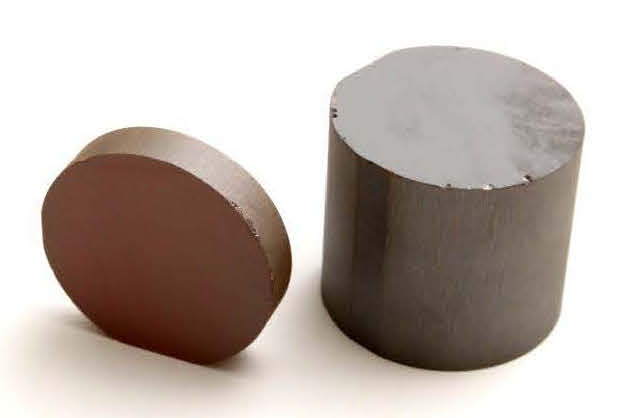
- GaP ingots (impure)

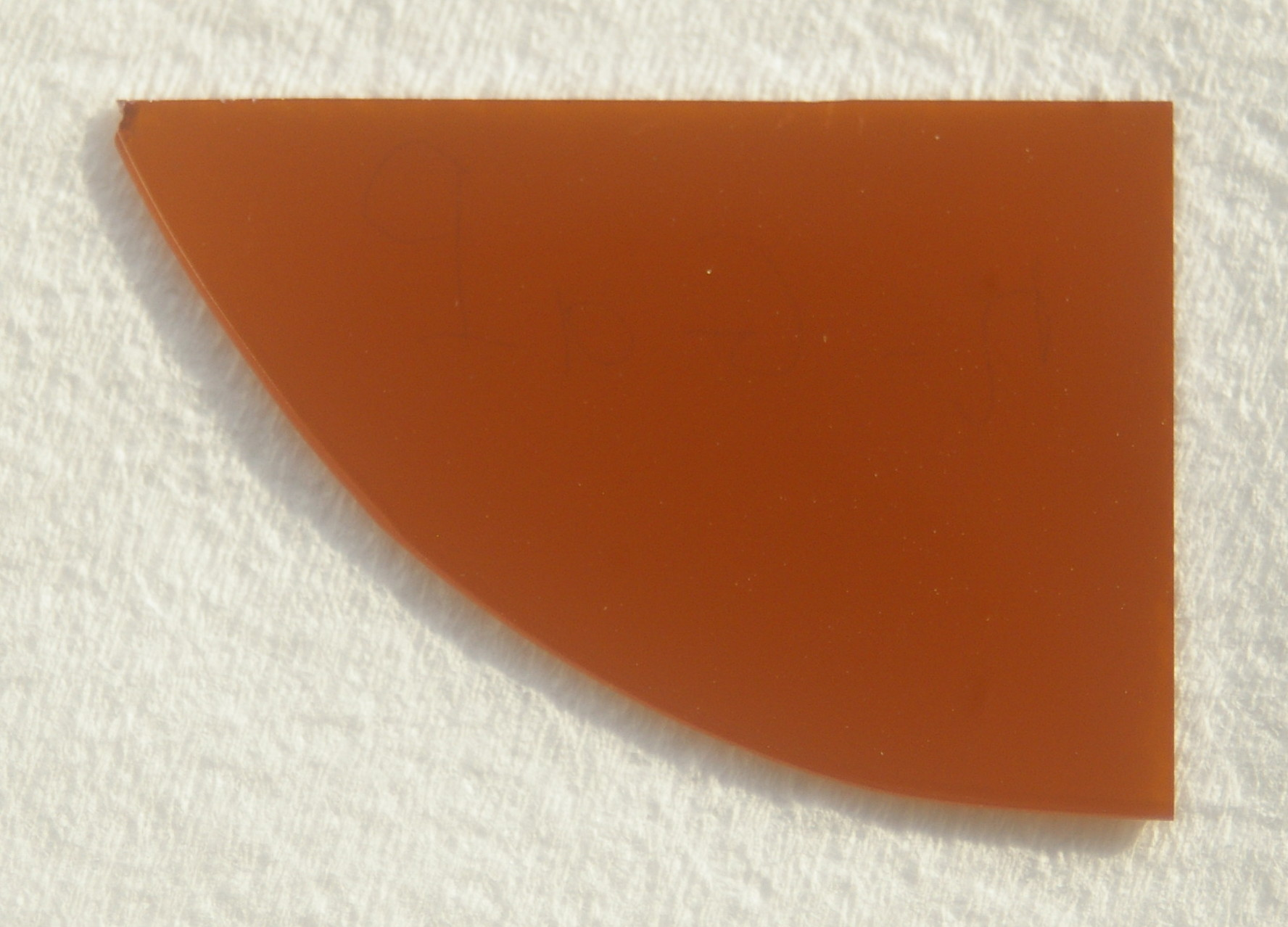
- GaP wafer (electronic device quality)

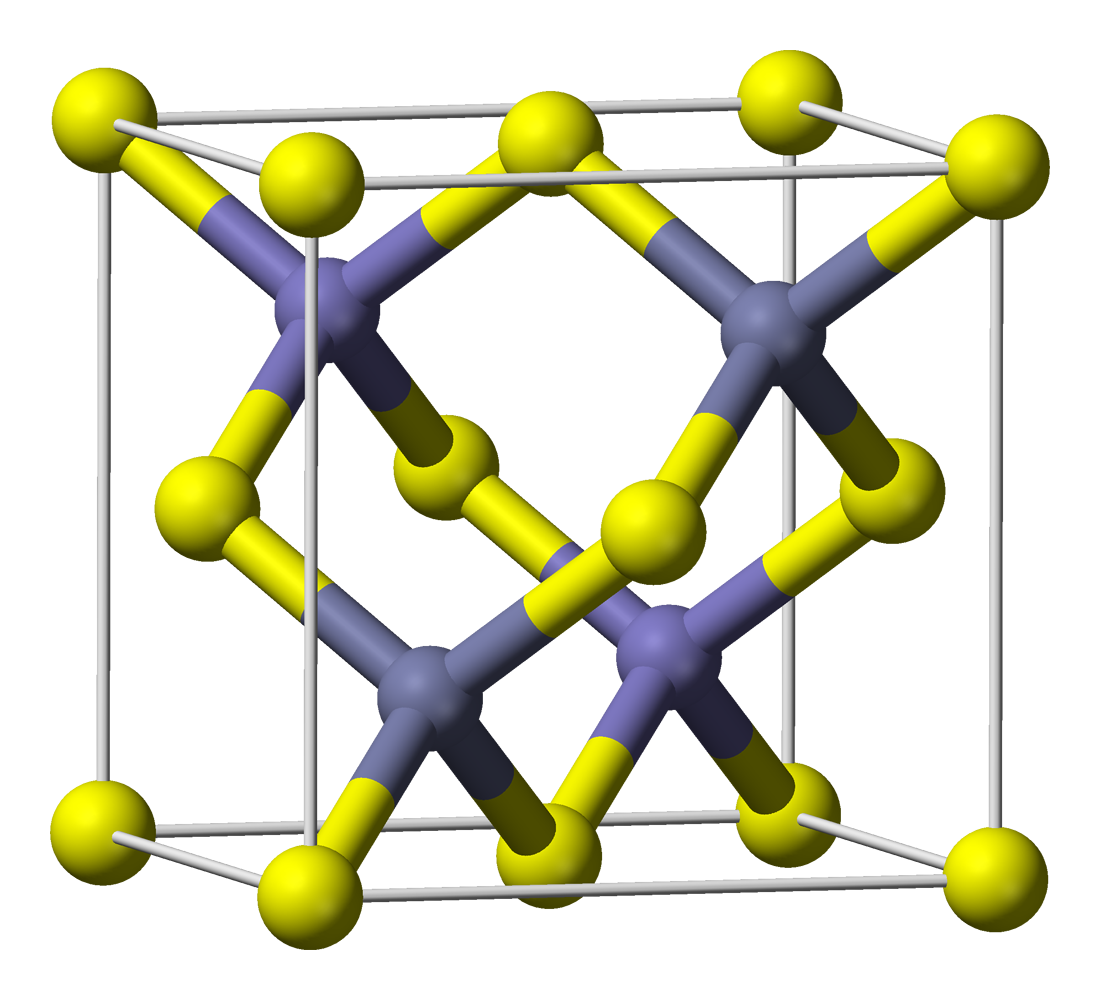

Names
- IUPAC name Gallium phosphide
- Other names Gallium(III) phosphide gallanylidynephosphane

Identifiers
CAS Number	12063-98-8
3D model (JSmol)	Interactive image; Interactive image
ChemSpider	74803
ECHA InfoCard	100.031.858
PubChem CID	82901
RTECS number	LW9675000
UNII	3J421F73DV
CompTox Dashboard (EPA)	DTXSID60894184
- InChI: InChI=1S/Ga.P Key: HZXMRANICFIONG-UHFFFAOYSA-N; InChI=1/Ga.P/rGaP/c1-2 Key: HZXMRANICFIONG-ZZOGKRAHAQ
- SMILES: [Ga]#P; [Ga+3].[P-3]

Properties
Chemical formula	GaP
Molar mass	100.697 g/mol
Appearance	pale orange solid
Odor	odorless
Density	4.138 g/cm^{3}
Melting point	1,457 °C (2,655 °F; 1,730 K)
Solubility in water	insoluble
Band gap	2.24 eV (indirect, 300 K)
Electron mobility	300 cm^{2}/(V·s) (300 K)
Magnetic susceptibility (χ)	−13.8×10^{−6} cgs
Thermal conductivity	0.752 W/(cm·K) (300 K)
Refractive index (n_{D})	2.964 (10 µm), 3.209 (775 nm), 3.590 (500 nm), 5.05 (354 nm)

Structure
Crystal structure	Zinc blende
Space group	T^{2}_{d}-F-43m
Lattice constant	a = 544.95 pm
Coordination geometry	Tetrahedral

Thermochemistry
Std enthalpy of formation (Δ_{f}H^{⦵}_{298})	−88.0 kJ/mol

Hazards
NFPA 704 (fire diamond)	3 1 0
Flash point	110 °C (230 °F; 383 K)

Related compounds
Other anions	Gallium nitride Gallium arsenide Gallium antimonide
Other cations	Aluminium phosphide Indium phosphide
- Except where otherwise noted, data are given for materials in their standard state (at 25 °C [77 °F], 100 kPa). verify (what is ?) Infobox references

Gallium phosphide (GaP), a phosphide of gallium, is a compound semiconductor material with an indirect band gap of 2.24 eV at room temperature. Impure polycrystalline material has the appearance of pale orange or grayish pieces. Undoped single crystals are orange, but strongly doped wafers appear darker due to free carrier absorption. It is odorless and insoluble in water.

GaP has a microhardness of 9450 N/mm^{2}, a Debye temperature of 446 K (173 °C), and a thermal expansion coefficient of 5.3 ×10^{−6} K^{−1} at room temperature. Sulfur, silicon or tellurium are used as dopants to produce n-type semiconductors. Zinc is used as a dopant for the p-type semiconductor.

Gallium phosphide has applications in optical systems. Its static dielectric constant is 11.1 at room temperature. Its refractive index varies between ~3.2 and 5.0 across the visible range, which is higher than in most other semiconducting materials. In its transparent range, its index is higher than almost any other transparent material, including gemstones such as diamond, or non-oxide lenses such as zinc sulfide.

== Light-emitting diodes ==
Gallium phosphide has been used in the manufacture of low-cost red, orange, and green light-emitting diodes (LEDs) with low to medium brightness since the 1960s. It is used standalone or together with gallium arsenide phosphide.

Pure GaP LEDs emit green light at a wavelength of 555 nm. Nitrogen-doped GaP emits yellow-green (565 nm) light, zinc oxide doped GaP emits red (700 nm).

Gallium phosphide is transparent for yellow and red light, therefore GaAsP-on-GaP LEDs are more efficient than GaAsP-on-GaAs.

== Crystal growth ==
At temperatures above ~900 °C, gallium phosphide dissociates and the phosphorus escapes as a gas. In crystal growth from a 1500 °C melt (for LED wafers), this must be prevented by holding the phosphorus in with a blanket of molten boric oxide in inert gas pressure of 10–100 atmospheres. The process is called liquid encapsulated Czochralski (LEC) growth, an elaboration of the Czochralski process used for silicon wafers.

== Cited sources ==
- Haynes, William M., ed. (2016). CRC Handbook of Chemistry and Physics (97th ed.). CRC Press. ISBN 9781498754293.
