= Indium arsenide =

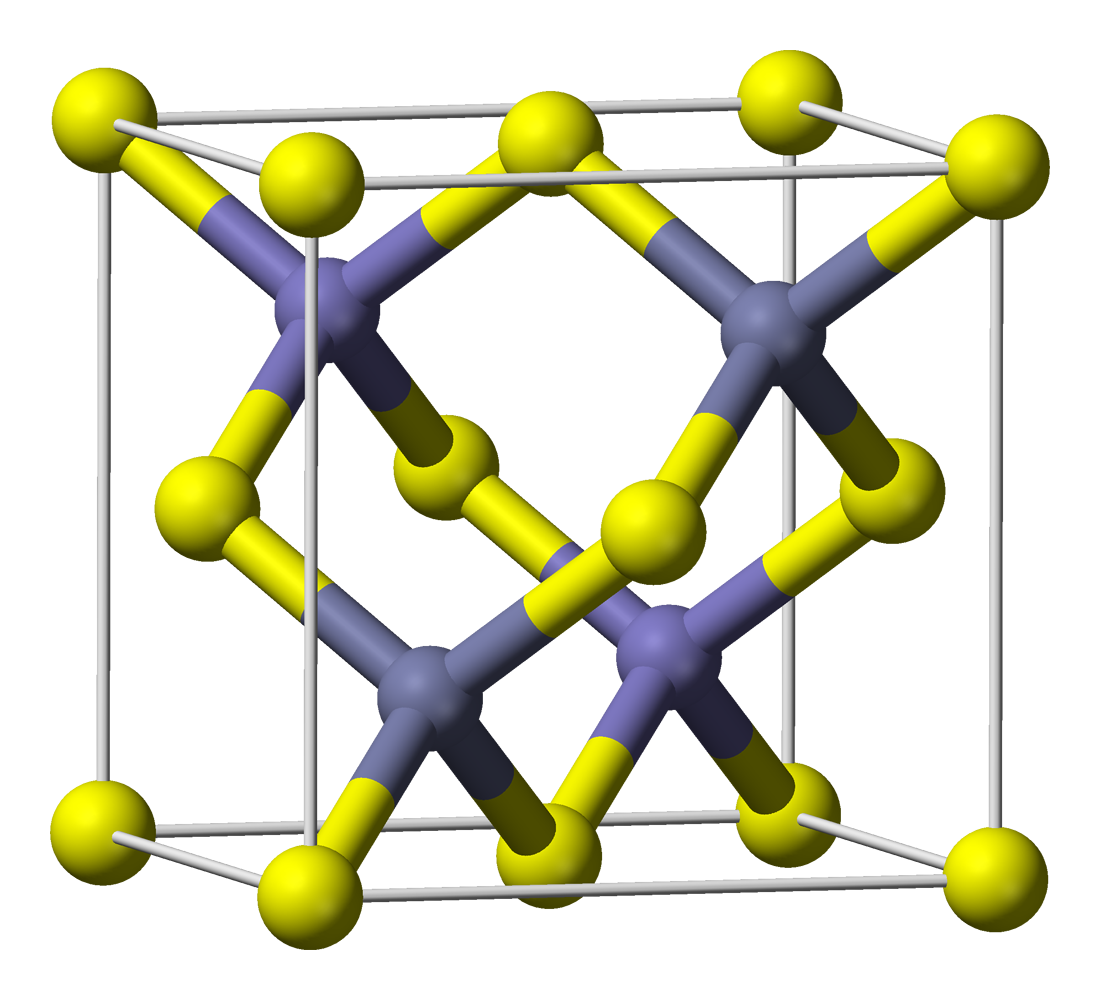

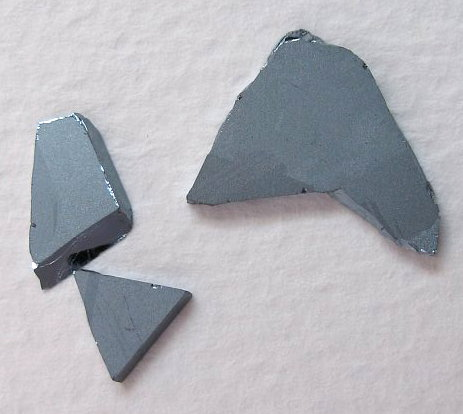

Names
- IUPAC name Indium(III) arsenide
- Other names Indium monoarsenide

Identifiers
CAS Number	1303-11-3
3D model (JSmol)	Interactive image; Interactive image
ChemSpider	82621
ECHA InfoCard	100.013.742
PubChem CID	91500
UNII	J1A23S0911
CompTox Dashboard (EPA)	DTXSID5023825
- InChI: InChI=1S/As.In Key: RPQDHPTXJYYUPQ-UHFFFAOYSA-N; InChI=1/As.In/rAsIn/c1-2 Key: RPQDHPTXJYYUPQ-FVESRWMKAB
- SMILES: [In+3].[As-3]; [In]#[As]

Properties
Chemical formula	InAs
Molar mass	189.740 g/mol
Density	5.67 g/cm^{3}
Melting point	942 °C (1,728 °F; 1,215 K)942
Band gap	0.354 eV (300 K)
Electron mobility	40000 cm^{2}/(V*s)
Thermal conductivity	0.27 W/(cm*K) (300 K)
Refractive index (n_{D})	4

Structure
Crystal structure	Zinc blende
Lattice constant	a = 6.0583 Å

Thermochemistry
Heat capacity (C)	47.8 J·mol^{−1}·K^{−1}
Std molar entropy (S^{⦵}_{298})	75.7 J·mol^{−1}·K^{−1}
Std enthalpy of formation (Δ_{f}H^{⦵}_{298})	−58.6 kJ·mol^{−1}
Gibbs free energy (Δ_{f}G^{⦵})	−53.6 kJ·mol^{−1}

Hazards
- GHS labelling
Pictograms	(GHS06: Toxic) (GHS08: Health hazard)
Signal word	Danger
Hazard statements	H301, H331
Precautionary statements	P261, P301+P310, P304+P340, P311, P405, P501
NFPA 704 (fire diamond)	4 0 0
Safety data sheet (SDS)	External SDS

Related compounds
Other anions	Indium nitride Indium phosphide Indium antimonide
Other cations	Gallium arsenide
- Except where otherwise noted, data are given for materials in their standard state (at 25 °C [77 °F], 100 kPa). verify (what is ?) Infobox references

Indium arsenide, InAs, or indium monoarsenide, is a narrow-bandgap semiconductor composed of indium and arsenic. It has the appearance of grey cubic crystals with a melting point of 942 °C.

Indium arsenide is similar in properties to gallium arsenide and is a direct bandgap material, with a bandgap of 0.35 eV at room temperature.

Indium arsenide is used for the construction of infrared detectors, for the wavelength range of 1.0–3.8 μm. The detectors are usually photovoltaic photodiodes. Cryogenically cooled detectors have lower noise, but InAs detectors can be used in higher-power applications at room temperature as well. Indium arsenide is also used for making diode lasers.

InAs is well known for its high electron mobility and narrow energy bandgap. It is widely used as a terahertz radiation source as it is a strong photo-Dember emitter.

Quantum dots can be formed in a monolayer of indium arsenide on indium phosphide or gallium arsenide. The mismatches of lattice constants of the materials create tensions in the surface layer, which in turn leads to the formation of the quantum dots. Quantum dots can also be formed in indium gallium arsenide, as indium arsenide dots sitting in the gallium arsenide matrix.

== Cited sources ==
- Haynes, William M., ed. (2016). CRC Handbook of Chemistry and Physics (97th ed.). CRC Press. ISBN 9781498754293.
