= Gallium antimonide =

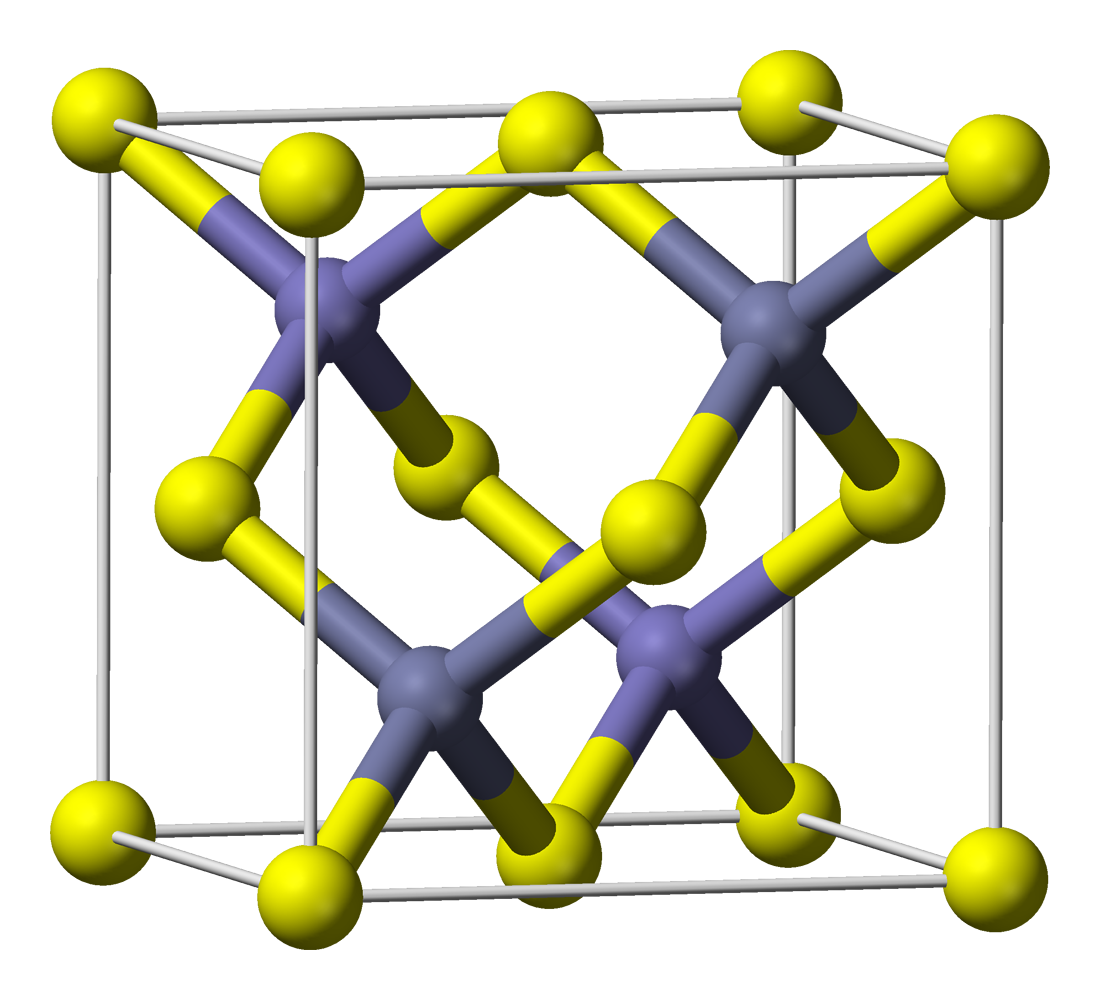

Names
- IUPAC name Gallium(III) antimonide
- Other names Gallium antimonide

Identifiers
CAS Number	12064-03-8
3D model (JSmol)	Interactive image; Interactive image
ChemSpider	3436915
ECHA InfoCard	100.031.859
PubChem CID	4227894
CompTox Dashboard (EPA)	DTXSID70884536
- InChI: InChI=1S/Ga.Sb Key: VTGARNNDLOTBET-UHFFFAOYSA-N; InChI=1/Ga.Sb/rGaSb/c1-2 Key: VTGARNNDLOTBET-KXXLTECTAC
- SMILES: [Ga]#[Sb]; [Ga+3].[Sb-3]

Properties
Chemical formula	GaSb
Molar mass	191.483 g/mol
Density	5.614 g/cm^{3}
Melting point	712 °C (1,314 °F; 985 K)
Solubility in water	insoluble
Band gap	0.726 eV (300 K)
Electron mobility	3000 cm^{2}/(V*s) (300 K)
Thermal conductivity	0.32 W/(cm*K) (300 K)
Refractive index (n_{D})	3.8

Structure
Crystal structure	Sphalerite, cF8
Space group	F-43m, No. 216

Hazards
NFPA 704 (fire diamond)	1 0 0
Flash point	Non-flammable

Related compounds
Other anions	Gallium nitride Gallium phosphide Gallium arsenide
- Except where otherwise noted, data are given for materials in their standard state (at 25 °C [77 °F], 100 kPa). verify (what is ?) Infobox references

Gallium antimonide (GaSb) is a semiconducting compound of gallium and antimony of the III-V family. It has a room temperature lattice constant of about 0.610 nm. It has a room temperature direct bandgap of approximately 0.73 eV.

== History ==
The intermetallic compound GaSb was first prepared in 1926 by Victor Goldschmidt, who directly combined the elements under an inert gas atmosphere and reported on GaSb's lattice constant, which has since been revised. Goldschmidt also synthesized gallium phosphide and gallium arsenide. The Ga-Sb phase equilibria was investigated in 1955 by Koster and by Greenfield.

== Applications ==
GaSb can be used for Infrared detectors, infrared LEDs and lasers and transistors, and thermophotovoltaic systems.

== See also ==
- Aluminium antimonide
- Indium antimonide
- Gallium arsenide
