= Chalcogenide glass =

Glass containing one or more of sulfur, selenium and tellurium

Chalcogenide glass (pronounced hard ch as in chemistry) is a glass containing one or more heavy chalcogens (sulfur, selenium or tellurium; polonium is also a heavy chalcogen but too radioactive to use). Chalcogenide materials behave rather differently from oxides, in particular their lower band gaps contribute to very dissimilar optical and electrical properties.

The classical chalcogenide glasses (mainly sulfur-based ones such as As-S or Ge-S) are strong glass-formers and possess glasses within large concentration regions. Glass-forming abilities decrease with increasing molar weight of constituent elements; i.e., S > Se > Te.

Chalcogenide compounds such as AgInSbTe and GeSbTe are used in rewritable optical disks and phase-change memory devices. They are fragile glass-formers: by controlling heating and annealing (cooling), they can be switched between an amorphous (glassy) and a crystalline state, thereby changing their optical and electrical properties and allowing the storage of information.

== Chemistry ==
Most stable binary chalcogenide glasses are compounds of a chalcogen and a group 14 or 15 element and may be formed in a wide range of atomic ratios. Ternary glasses are also known.

Not all chalcogenide compositions exist in glassy form, though it is possible to find materials with which these non-glass-forming compositions can be alloyed in order to form a glass. An example of this is gallium sulphide-based glasses. Gallium(III) sulphide on its own is not a known glass former; however, with sodium or lanthanum sulphides it forms a glass, gallium lanthanum sulphide (GLS).

Up until recently, chalcogenide glasses (ChGs) were believed to be predominantly covalently bonded materials and classified as covalent network solids. A most recent and extremely comprehensive university study of more than 265 different ChG elemental compositions, representing 40 different elemental families now shows that the vast majority of chalcogenide glasses are more accurately defined as being predominantly bonded by the weaker van der Waals forces of atomic physics and more accurately classified as van der Waals network solids. They are not exclusively bonded by these weaker vdW forces, and do exhibit varying percentages of covalency, based upon their specific chemical makeup.

== Applications ==
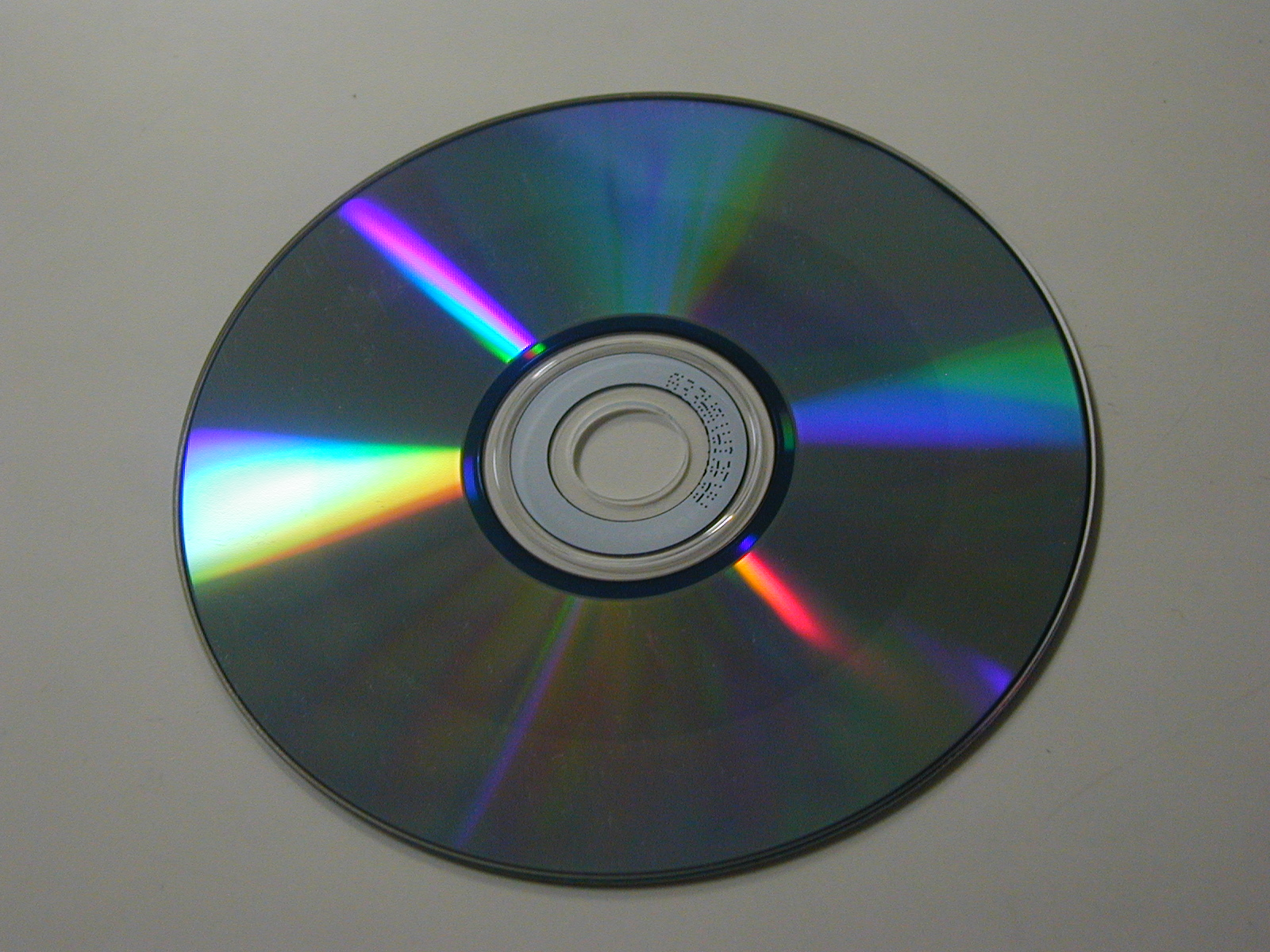
A CD-RW (CD). Amorphous chalcogenide materials form the basis of re-writable CD and DVD solid-state memory technology.

Uses include infrared detectors, mouldable infrared optics such as lenses, and infrared optical fibers, with the main advantage being that these materials transmit across a wide range of the infrared electromagnetic spectrum.

The physical properties of chalcogenide glasses (high refractive index, low phonon energy, high nonlinearity) also make them ideal for incorporation into lasers, planar optics, photonic integrated circuits, and other active devices especially if doped with rare-earth element ions. Some chalcogenide glasses exhibit several non-linear optical effects such as photon-induced refraction, and electron-induced permittivity modification

Some chalcogenide materials experience thermally driven amorphous-to-crystalline phase changes. This makes them useful for encoding binary information on thin films of chalcogenides and forms the basis of rewritable optical discs and non-volatile memory devices such as PRAM. Examples of such phase change materials are GeSbTe and AgInSbTe. In optical discs, the phase change layer is usually sandwiched between dielectric layers of ZnS-SiO_{2}, sometimes with a layer of a crystallization promoting film. Other less commonly used such materials are InSe, SbSe, SbTe, InSbSe, InSbTe, GeSbSe, GeSbTeSe and AgInSbSeTe.

Intel claims that its chalcogenide-based 3D XPoint memory technology achieves throughput and write durability 1,000 times higher than flash memory.

Electrical switching in chalcogenide semiconductors emerged in the 1960s, when the amorphous chalcogenide Te_{48}As_{30}Si_{12}Ge_{10} was found to exhibit sharp, reversible transitions in electrical resistance above a threshold voltage. If current is allowed to persist in the non-crystalline material, it heats up and changes to crystalline form. This is equivalent to information being written on it. A crystalline region may be melted by exposure to a brief, intense pulse of heat. Subsequent rapid cooling then sends the melted region back through the glass transition. Conversely, a lower-intensity heat pulse of longer duration will crystallize an amorphous region. Attempts to induce the glassy–crystal transformation of chalcogenides by electrical means form the basis of phase-change random-access memory (PC-RAM). This technology has been developed to near commercial use by ECD Ovonics. For write operations, an electric current supplies the heat pulse. The read process is performed at sub-threshold voltages by utilizing the relatively large difference in electrical resistance between the glassy and crystalline states. Examples of such phase change materials are GeSbTe and AgInSbTe.

In addition to memory applications, mechanical property contrast between amorphous and crystalline phases is an emerging concept of frequency tuning in resonant nanoelectromechanical systems.

== Research ==
The semiconducting properties of chalcogenide glasses were revealed in 1955 by B.T. Kolomiets and N.A. Gorunova from Ioffe Institute, USSR.

Although the electronic structural transitions relevant to both optical discs and PC-RAM were featured strongly, contributions from ions were not considered—even though amorphous chalcogenides can have significant ionic conductivities. At Euromat 2005 it was shown that ionic transport can also be useful for data storage in a solid chalcogenide electrolyte. At the nanoscale, this electrolyte consists of crystalline metallic islands of silver selenide (Ag_{2}Se) dispersed in an amorphous semiconducting matrix of germanium selenide (Ge_{2}Se_{3}).

The electronic applications of chalcogenide glasses have been an active topic of research throughout the second half of the 20th century and beyond. For example, the migration of dissolved ions is required in the electrolytic case, but could limit the performance of a phase-change device. Diffusion of both electrons and ions participate in electromigration—widely studied as a degradation mechanism of the electrical conductors used in modern integrated circuits. Thus, a unified approach to the study of chalcogenides, assessing the collective roles of atoms, ions and electrons, may prove essential for both device performance and reliability.
