= Gallium arsenide =

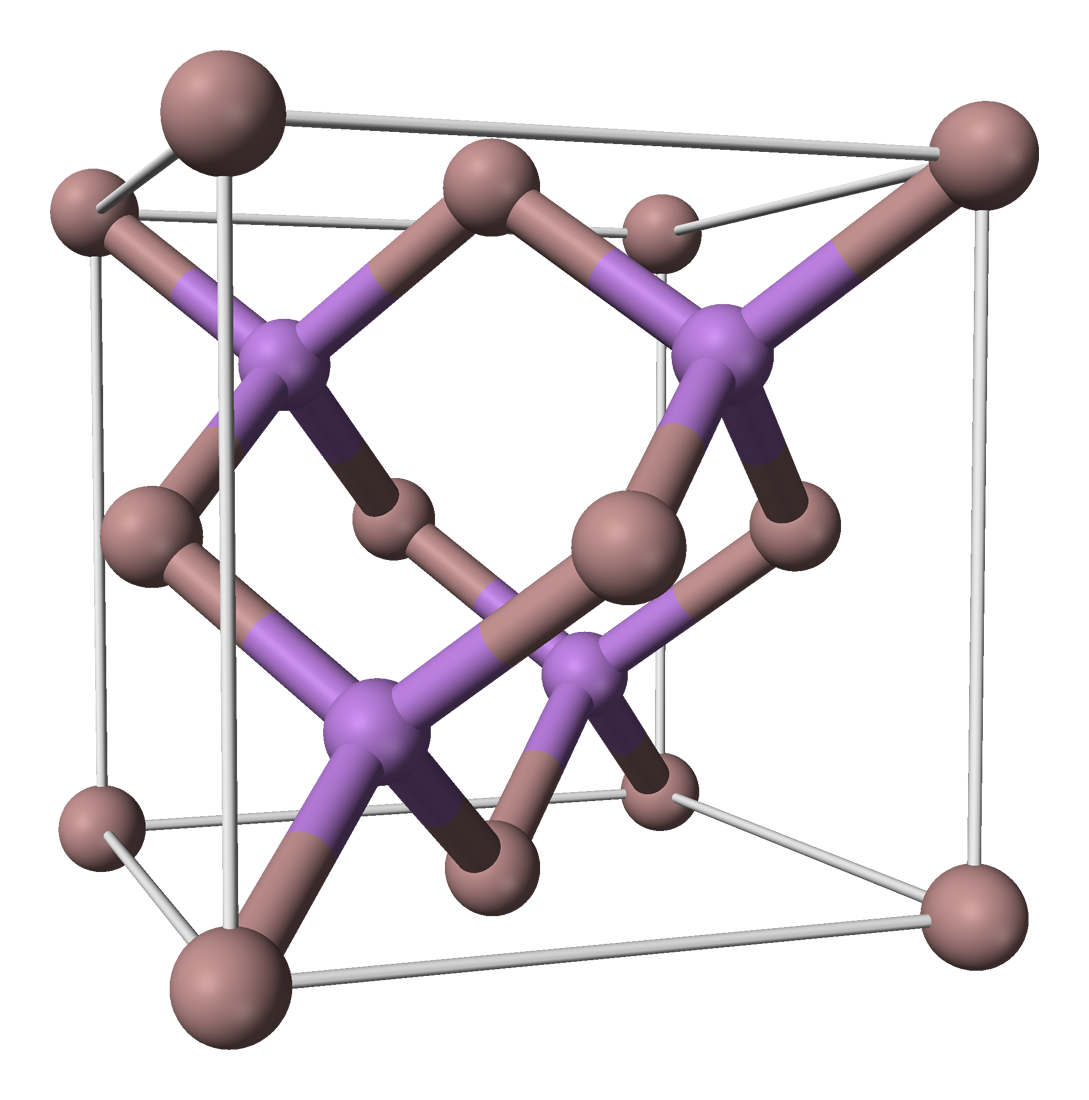
- Samples of gallium arsenide

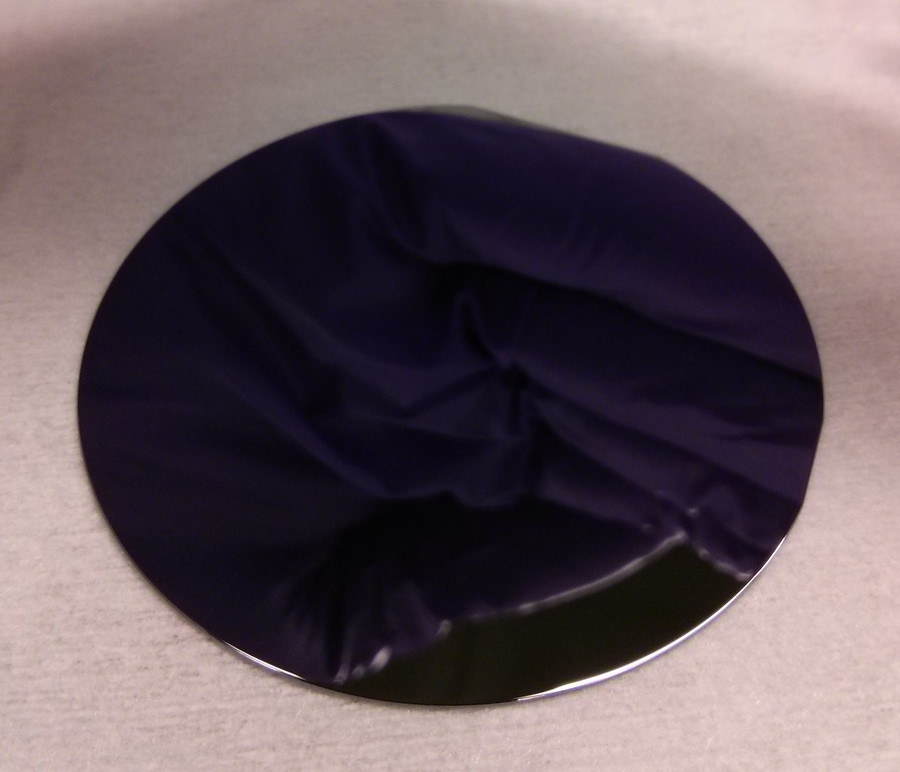
- GaAs wafer of (100) orientation

Names
- Preferred IUPAC name Gallium arsenide

Identifiers
| CAS Number | 1303-00-0 |
| 3D model (JSmol) | Interactive image; Interactive image |
| ChemSpider | 14087 |
| ECHA InfoCard | 100.013.741 |
| EC Number | 215-114-8 |
| MeSH | gallium+arsenide |
| PubChem CID | 14770 |
| RTECS number | LW8800000 |
| UNII | 27FC46GA44 |
| UN number | 1557 |
| CompTox Dashboard (EPA) | DTXSID2023779 |
- InChI: InChI=1S/AsH3.Ga.3H/h1H3;;;; Key: SHVQQKYXGUBHBI-UHFFFAOYSA-N
- SMILES: [Ga]#[As]; [Ga+3].[As-3]

Properties
| Chemical formula | GaAs |
| Molar mass | 144.645 g/mol |
| Appearance | Gray crystals |
| Odor | garlic-like when moistened |
| Density | 5.3176 g/cm^{3} |
| Melting point | 1,238 °C (2,260 °F; 1,511 K) |
| Solubility in water | insoluble |
| Solubility | soluble in HCl insoluble in ethanol, methanol, acetone |
| Band gap | 1.424 eV (at 300 K) |
| Electron mobility | 9000 cm^{2}/(V·s) (at 300 K) |
| Magnetic susceptibility (χ) | −16.2×10^{−6} cgs |
| Thermal conductivity | 0.56 W/(cm·K) (at 300 K) |
| Refractive index (n_{D}) | 3.3 |

Structure
| Crystal structure | Zinc blende |
| Space group | T^{2}_{d}-F-43m |
| Lattice constant | a = 565.315 pm |
| Coordination geometry | Tetrahedral |
| Molecular shape | Linear |

Hazards
- GHS labelling
| Pictograms | (GHS08: Health hazard) |
| Signal word | Danger |
| Hazard statements | H350, H360F, H372 |
| Precautionary statements | P261, P273, P301+P310, P311, P501 |
| NFPA 704 (fire diamond) | 3 0 0 |
| Safety data sheet (SDS) | External MSDS |

Related compounds
| Other anions | Gallium nitride Gallium phosphide Gallium antimonide |
- Except where otherwise noted, data are given for materials in their standard state (at 25 °C [77 °F], 100 kPa). verify (what is ?) Infobox references

Gallium arsenide (GaAs) is a III-V direct band gap semiconductor with a zinc blende crystal structure.

Gallium arsenide is used in the manufacture of devices such as microwave frequency integrated circuits, monolithic microwave integrated circuits, infrared light-emitting diodes, laser diodes, solar cells and optical windows.

GaAs is often used as a substrate material for the epitaxial growth of other III-V semiconductors, including indium gallium arsenide, aluminum gallium arsenide and others.

== History ==
Gallium arsenide was first synthesized and studied by Victor Goldschmidt in 1926 by passing arsenic vapors mixed with hydrogen over gallium(III) oxide at 600 °C. The semiconductor properties of GaAs and other III-V compounds were patented by Heinrich Welker at Siemens-Schuckert in 1951 and described in a 1952 publication. Commercial production of its monocrystals commenced in 1954, and more studies followed in the 1950s. First infrared LEDs were made in 1962.

== Preparation and chemistry ==
In the compound, gallium has a +3 oxidation state. Gallium arsenide single crystals can be prepared by three industrial processes:

- The vertical gradient freeze (VGF) process.
- Crystal growth using a horizontal zone furnace in the Bridgman-Stockbarger technique, in which gallium and arsenic vapors react, and free molecules deposit on a seed crystal at the cooler end of the furnace.
- Liquid encapsulated Czochralski (LEC) growth is used for producing high-purity single crystals that can exhibit semi-insulating characteristics (see below). Most GaAs wafers are produced using this process.

Alternative methods for producing films of GaAs include:

- VPE reaction of gaseous gallium metal and arsenic trichloride: 2 Ga + 2 AsCl_{3} → 2 GaAs + 3 Cl_{2}
- MOCVD reaction of trimethylgallium and arsine: Ga(CH_{3})_{3} + AsH_{3} → GaAs + 3 CH_{4}
- Molecular beam epitaxy (MBE) of gallium and arsenic: 4 Ga + As_{4} → 4 GaAs or 2 Ga + As_{2} → 2 GaAs

Oxidation of GaAs occurs in air, degrading performance of the semiconductor. The surface can be passivated by depositing a cubic gallium(II) sulfide layer using a tert-butyl gallium sulfide compound such as (^{^{t}}BuGaS)_{7}.

=== Semi-insulating crystals ===
In the presence of excess arsenic, GaAs boules grow with crystallographic defects; specifically, arsenic antisite defects (an arsenic atom at a gallium atom site within the crystal lattice). The electronic properties of these defects (interacting with others) cause the Fermi level to be pinned to near the center of the band gap, so that this GaAs crystal has very low concentration of electrons and holes. This low carrier concentration is similar to an intrinsic (perfectly undoped) crystal, but much easier to achieve in practice. These crystals are called "semi-insulating", reflecting their high resistivity of 10^{7}–10^{9} Ω·cm (which is quite high for a semiconductor, but still much lower than a true insulator like glass).

=== Etching ===
Wet etching of GaAs industrially uses an oxidizing agent such as hydrogen peroxide or bromine water, and the same strategy has been described in a patent relating to processing scrap components containing GaAs where the Ga^{3+} is complexed with a hydroxamic acid ("HA"), for example:

GaAs + H_{2}O_{2} + "HA" → "GaA" complex + H_{3}AsO_{4} + 4 H_{2}O

This reaction produces arsenic acid.

== Electronics ==
=== GaAs digital logic ===
GaAs can be used for various transistor types:

- Metal–semiconductor field-effect transistor (MESFET)
- High-electron-mobility transistor (HEMT)
- Junction field-effect transistor (JFET)
- Heterojunction bipolar transistor (HBT)
- Metal–oxide–semiconductor field-effect transistor (MOSFET)

The HBT can be used in integrated injection logic (I^{2}L).

The earliest GaAs logic gate used Buffered FET Logic (BFL).

From c. 1975 to 1995 the main logic families used were:

- Source-coupled FET logic (SCFL) fastest and most complex, (used by TriQuint & Vitesse Semiconductor)
- Capacitor–diode FET logic (CDFL) (used by Cray for Cray-3)
- Direct-coupled FET logic (DCFL) simplest and lowest power (used by Vitesse for VLSI gate arrays)

=== Comparison with silicon for electronics ===
==== GaAs advantages ====
Some electronic properties of gallium arsenide are superior to those of silicon. It has a higher saturated electron velocity and higher electron mobility, allowing gallium arsenide transistors to function at frequencies in excess of 250 GHz. GaAs devices are relatively insensitive to overheating due to their wider energy band gap. They also tend to create less noise (disturbance in an electrical signal) in electronic circuits than silicon devices, especially at high frequencies, due to higher carrier mobilities and lower resistive device parasitics. These superior properties are compelling reasons to use GaAs circuitry in mobile phones, satellite communications, microwave point-to-point links and higher frequency radar systems. It is also used in the manufacture of Gunn diodes for the generation of microwaves.

Another advantage of GaAs is that it has a direct band gap, which means that it can be used to absorb and emit light efficiently. Silicon has an indirect band gap and so is relatively poor at emitting light.

As a wide direct band gap material with resulting resistance to radiation damage, GaAs is an excellent material for outer space electronics and optical windows in high power applications.

Because of its wide band gap, pure GaAs is highly resistive. Combined with a high dielectric constant, this property makes GaAs a very good substrate for integrated circuits and unlike Si provides natural isolation between devices and circuits. This has made it an ideal material for monolithic microwave integrated circuits (MMICs), where active and essential passive components can readily be produced on a single slice of GaAs.

One of the first GaAs microprocessors was developed in the early 1980s by the RCA Corporation and was considered for the Star Wars program of the United States Department of Defense. These processors were several times faster and several orders of magnitude more radiation resistant than their silicon counterparts, but were more expensive. Other GaAs processors were implemented by the supercomputer vendors Cray Computer Corporation, Convex, and Alliant in an attempt to stay ahead of the ever-improving CMOS microprocessor. Cray eventually built one GaAs-based machine in the early 1990s, the Cray-3, but the effort was not adequately capitalized, and the company filed for bankruptcy in 1995.

Complex layered structures of gallium arsenide in combination with aluminium arsenide (AlAs) or the alloy Al_{x}Ga_{1−x}As can be grown using molecular-beam epitaxy (MBE) or using metalorganic vapor-phase epitaxy (MOVPE). Because GaAs and AlAs have almost the same lattice constant, the layers have very little induced strain, which allows them to be grown almost arbitrarily thick. This allows extremely high performance and high electron mobility HEMT transistors and other quantum well devices.

GaAs is used for monolithic radar power amplifiers (but GaN can be less susceptible to heat damage).

==== Silicon advantages ====
Silicon has three major advantages over GaAs for integrated circuit manufacture. First, silicon is abundant and cheap to process in the form of silicate minerals. The economies of scale available to the silicon industry has also hindered the adoption of GaAs.

Si crystals have a very stable structure and can be grown to very large diameter boules and processed with very good yields. It possesses high thermal conductivity for a nonmental, thus enabling very dense packing of transistors that need to get rid of their heat of operation, all very desirable for design and manufacturing of very large ICs. These mechanical characteristics make it a suitable material for nanoelectronics. Naturally, a GaAs surface cannot withstand the high temperatures needed for diffusion; however a viable and actively pursued alternative as of the 1980s was ion implantation.

The second major advantage of Si is the existence of a native oxide (silicon dioxide, SiO_{2}), which is used as an insulator. Silicon dioxide can be incorporated onto silicon circuits easily, and such layers are adherent to the underlying silicon. SiO_{2} is not only a good insulator (with a band gap of 8.9 eV), but the Si-SiO_{2} interface can be easily engineered to have excellent electrical properties, most importantly low density of interface states. GaAs does not have a native oxide, does not easily support a stable adherent insulating layer, and does not possess the dielectric strength or surface passivating qualities of the Si-SiO_{2}.

Aluminum oxide (Al_{2}O_{3}) has been extensively studied as a possible gate oxide for GaAs (as well as InGaAs).

The third advantage of silicon is that it possesses a higher hole mobility compared to GaAs (500 versus 400 cm^{2}V^{−1}s^{−1}). This high mobility allows the fabrication of higher-speed P-channel field-effect transistors, which are required for CMOS logic. Because they lack a fast CMOS structure, GaAs circuits must use logic styles which have much higher power consumption; this has made GaAs logic circuits unable to compete with silicon logic circuits.

For manufacturing solar cells, silicon has relatively low absorptivity for sunlight, meaning about 100 micrometers of Si is needed to absorb most sunlight. Such a layer is relatively robust and easy to handle. In contrast, the absorptivity of GaAs is so high that only a few micrometers of thickness are needed to absorb all of the light. Consequently, GaAs thin films must be supported on a substrate material.

Silicon is a pure element, avoiding the problems of stoichiometric imbalance and thermal unmixing of GaAs.

Silicon has a nearly perfect lattice; impurity density is very low and allows very small structures to be built (down to 5 nm in commercial production as of 2020). In contrast, GaAs has a very high impurity density, which makes it difficult to build integrated circuits with small structures, so the 500 nm process is a common process for GaAs.

Silicon has about three times the thermal conductivity of GaAs, with less risk of local overheating in high power devices.

== Other applications ==
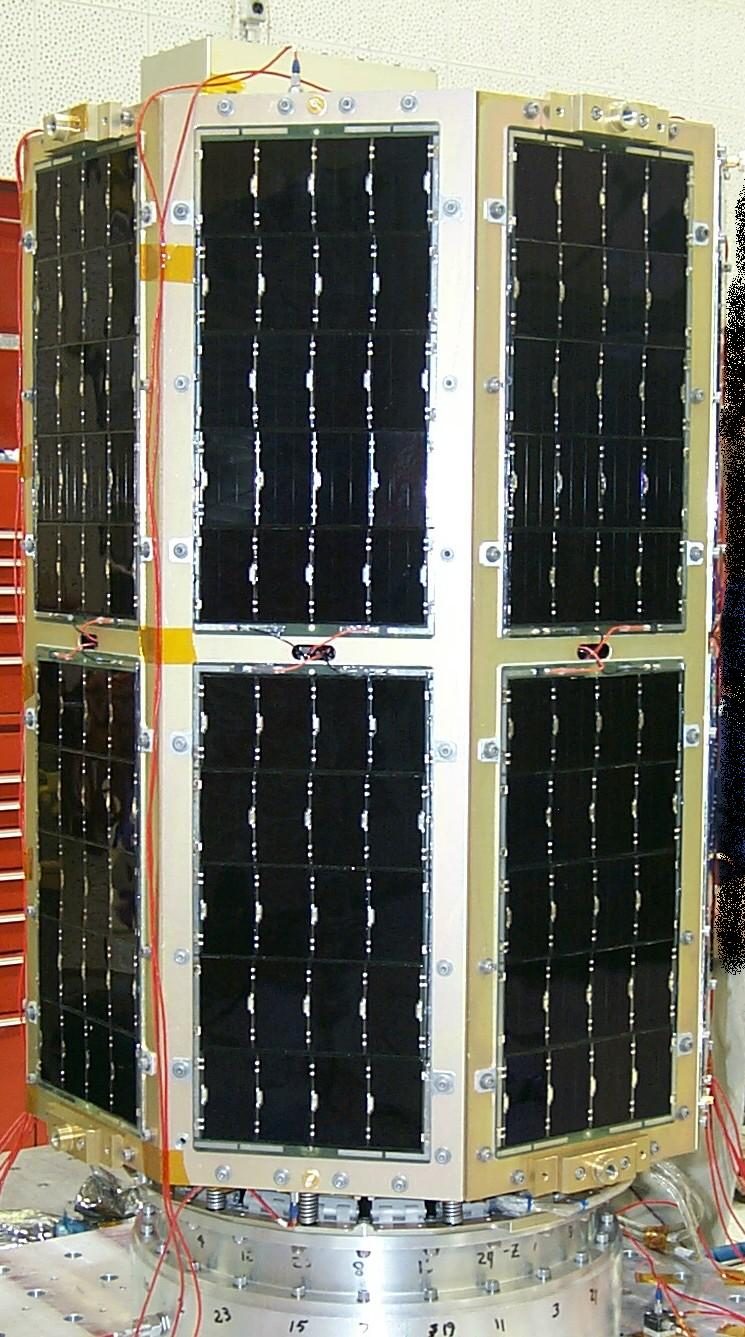
Triple-junction GaAs cells covering MidSTAR-1

=== Transistor uses ===
Gallium arsenide (GaAs) transistors are used in the RF power amplifiers for cell phones and wireless communicating. GaAs wafers are used in laser diodes, photodetectors, and radio frequency (RF) amplifiers for mobile phones and base stations. GaAs transistors are also integral to monolithic microwave integrated circuits (MMICs), utilized in satellite communication and radar systems, as well as in low-noise amplifiers (LNAs) that enhance weak signals.

=== Solar cells and detectors ===
Gallium arsenide is an important semiconductor material for high-cost, high-efficiency solar cells and is used for single-crystalline thin-film solar cells and for multi-junction solar cells.

The first known operational use of GaAs solar cells in space was for the Venera 3 mission, launched in 1965. The GaAs solar cells, manufactured by Kvant, were chosen because of their higher performance in high temperature environments. GaAs cells were then used for the Lunokhod rovers for the same reason.

In 1970, the GaAs heterostructure solar cells were developed by the team led by Zhores Alferov in the USSR, achieving much higher efficiencies. In the early 1980s, the efficiency of the best GaAs solar cells surpassed that of conventional, crystalline silicon-based solar cells. In the 1990s, GaAs solar cells took over from silicon as the cell type most commonly used for photovoltaic arrays for satellite applications. Later, dual- and triple-junction solar cells based on GaAs with germanium and indium gallium phosphide layers were developed as the basis of a triple-junction solar cell, which held a record efficiency of over 32% and can operate also with light as concentrated as 2,000 suns. This kind of solar cell powered the Mars Exploration Rovers Spirit and Opportunity, which explored Mars' surface. Also many solar cars utilize GaAs in solar arrays, as did the Hubble Telescope.

GaAs-based devices hold the world record for the highest-efficiency single-junction solar cell at 29.1% (as of 2019). This high efficiency is attributed to the extreme high quality GaAs epitaxial growth, surface passivation by the AlGaAs, and the promotion of photon recycling by the thin film design. GaAs-based photovoltaics are also responsible for the highest efficiency (as of 2022) of conversion of light to electricity, as researchers from the Fraunhofer Institute for Solar Energy Systems achieved a 68.9% efficiency when exposing a GaAs thin film photovoltaic cell to monochromatic laser light with a wavelength of 858 nanometers.

Today, multi-junction GaAs cells have the highest efficiencies of existing photovoltaic cells and trajectories show that this is likely to continue to be the case for the foreseeable future. In 2022, Rocket Lab unveiled a solar cell with 33.3% efficiency based on inverted metamorphic multi-junction (IMM) technology. In IMM, the lattice-matched (same lattice parameters) materials are grown first, followed by mismatched materials. The top cell, GaInP, is grown first and lattice matched to the GaAs substrate, followed by a layer of either GaAs or GaInAs with a minimal mismatch, and the last layer has the greatest lattice mismatch. After growth, the cell is mounted to a secondary handle and the GaAs substrate is removed. A main advantage of the IMM process is that the inverted growth according to lattice mismatch allows a path to higher cell efficiency.

Complex designs of Al_{x}Ga_{1−x}As-GaAs devices using quantum wells can be sensitive to infrared radiation (QWIP).

GaAs diodes can be used for the detection of X-rays.

==== Future outlook of GaAs solar cells ====
Despite GaAs-based photovoltaics being the clear champions of efficiency for solar cells, they have relatively limited use in today's market. In both world electricity generation and world electricity generating capacity, solar electricity is growing faster than any other source of fuel (wind, hydro, biomass, and so on) for the last decade. However, GaAs solar cells have not currently been adopted for widespread solar electricity generation. This is largely due to the cost of GaAs solar cells - in space applications, high performance is required and the corresponding high cost of the existing GaAs technologies is accepted. For example, GaAs-based photovoltaics show the best resistance to gamma radiation and high temperature fluctuations, which are of great importance for spacecraft. But in comparison to other solar cells, III-V solar cells are two to three orders of magnitude more expensive than other technologies such as silicon-based solar cells. The primary sources of this cost are the epitaxial growth costs and the substrate the cell is deposited on.

GaAs solar cells are most commonly fabricated utilizing epitaxial growth techniques such as metal-organic chemical vapor deposition (MOCVD) and hydride vapor phase epitaxy (HVPE). A significant reduction in costs for these methods would require improvements in tool costs, throughput, material costs, and manufacturing efficiency. Increasing the deposition rate could reduce costs, but this cost reduction would be limited by the fixed times in other parts of the process such as cooling and heating.

The substrate used to grow these solar cells is usually germanium or gallium arsenide which are notably expensive materials. One of the main pathways to reduce substrate costs is to reuse the substrate. An early method proposed to accomplish this is epitaxial lift-off (ELO), but this method is time-consuming, somewhat dangerous (with its use of hydrofluoric acid), and requires multiple post-processing steps. However, other methods have been proposed that use phosphide-based materials and hydrochloric acid to achieve ELO with surface passivation and minimal post-etching residues and allows for direct reuse of the GaAs substrate. There is also preliminary evidence that spalling could be used to remove the substrate for reuse. An alternative path to reduce substrate cost is to use cheaper materials, although materials for this application are not currently commercially available or developed.

Yet another consideration to lower GaAs solar cell costs could be concentrator photovoltaics. Concentrators use lenses or parabolic mirrors to focus light onto a solar cell, and thus a smaller (and therefore less expensive) GaAs solar cell is needed to achieve the same results. Concentrator systems have the highest efficiency of existing photovoltaics.

So, technologies such as concentrator photovoltaics and methods in development to lower epitaxial growth and substrate costs could lead to a reduction in the cost of GaAs solar cells and forge a path for use in terrestrial applications.

=== Laser Diodes ===
Band structure of GaAs. The direct gap of GaAs results in efficient emission of infrared light at 1.424 eV (~870 nm).

GaAs has been used to produce near-infrared laser diodes since 1962. It is often used in alloys with other semiconductor compounds for these applications.

In 1972, Nature described work by G. H. B. Thompson at Standard Telecommunication Laboratories on GaAs double-heterostructure lasers as a "notable advance"; by narrowing the carrier-confinement region to 0.18 μm, a threshold current density of 820 A cm^{−2} was obtained.

=== Cryogenic Scintillators ===
N-type GaAs doped with silicon donor atoms (on Ga sites) and boron acceptor atoms (on As sites) responds to ionizing radiation by emitting scintillation photons. At cryogenic temperatures it is among the brightest scintillators known and is a promising candidate for detecting rare electronic excitations from interacting dark matter, due to the following six essential factors:

1. Silicon donor electrons in GaAs have a binding energy that is among the lowest of all known n-type semiconductors. Free electrons above 8×10^{15} per cm^{3} are not "frozen out" and remain delocalized at cryogenic temperatures.
2. Boron and gallium are group III elements, so boron as an impurity primarily occupies the gallium site. However, a sufficient number occupy the arsenic site and act as acceptors that efficiently trap ionization event holes from the valence band.
3. After trapping an ionization event hole from the valence band, the boron acceptors can combine radiatively with delocalized donor electrons to produce photons 0.2 eV below the cryogenic band-gap energy (1.52 eV). This is an efficient radiative process that produces scintillation photons that are not absorbed by the GaAs crystal.
4. There is no afterglow, because metastable radiative centers are quickly annihilated by the delocalized electrons. This is evidenced by the lack of thermally induced luminescence.
5. N-type GaAs has a high refractive index (~3.5) and the narrow-beam absorption coefficient is proportional to the free electron density and typically several per cm. One would expect that almost all of the scintillation photons should be trapped and absorbed in the crystal, but this is not the case. Recent Monte Carlo and Feynman path integral calculations have shown that the high luminosity could be explained if most of the narrow beam absorption is not absolute absorption but a novel type of optical scattering from the conduction electrons with a cross section of about 5 × 10^{−18} cm^{2} that allows scintillation photons to escape total internal reflection. This cross section is about 10^{7} times larger than Thomson scattering but comparable to the optical cross section of the conduction electrons in a metal mirror.
6. N-type GaAs(Si,B) is commercially grown as 10 kg crystal ingots and sliced into thin wafers as substrates for electronic circuits. Boron oxide is used as an encapsulant to prevent the loss of arsenic during crystal growth, but also has the benefit of providing boron acceptors for scintillation.

=== Fiber optic temperature measurement ===
For this purpose an optical fiber tip of an optical fiber temperature sensor is equipped with a gallium arsenide crystal. Starting at a light wavelength of 850 nm GaAs becomes optically translucent. Since the spectral position of the band gap is temperature dependent, it shifts about 0.4 nm/K. The measurement device contains a light source and a device for the spectral detection of the band gap. With the changing of the band gap, (0.4 nm/K) an algorithm calculates the temperature (all 250 ms).

=== Spin-charge converters ===
GaAs may have applications in spintronics as it can be used instead of platinum in spin-charge converters and may be more tunable.

=== Traveling-wave amplifiers ===
GaAs has been effectively utilized to fabricate traveling-wave amplifiers.

== Safety ==
The environment, health and safety aspects of gallium arsenide sources (such as trimethylgallium and arsine) and industrial hygiene monitoring studies of metalorganic precursors have been reported. California lists gallium arsenide as a carcinogen, as do IARC and ECA, and it is considered a known carcinogen in animals. On the other hand, a 2013 review (funded by industry) argued against these classifications, saying that when rats or mice inhale fine GaAs powders (as in previous studies), they get cancer from the resulting lung irritation and inflammation, rather than from a primary carcinogenic effect of the GaAs itself—and that, moreover, fine GaAs powders are unlikely to be created in the production or use of GaAs.

== See also ==
- Aluminium arsenide
- Aluminium gallium arsenide
- Arsine
- Cadmium telluride
- Gallium antimonide
- Gallium arsenide phosphide
- Gallium manganese arsenide
- Gallium nitride
- Gallium phosphide
- Heterostructure emitter bipolar transistor
- Indium arsenide
- Indium gallium arsenide
- Indium phosphide
- Light-emitting diode
- MESFET (metal–semiconductor field-effect transistor)
- MOVPE
- Multijunction solar cell
- Photomixing to generate THz
- Trimethylgallium

== Cited sources ==
- Haynes, William M., ed. (2011). CRC Handbook of Chemistry and Physics (92nd ed.). CRC Press. ISBN 978-1439855119.
