= Hitchin-Stevenage Fibre Optic trial =

In 1977 a technical trial took place between Hitchin and Stevenage in Hertfordshire, UK, to demonstrate that optical fibre was capable of transmitting high speed data over large distances.

The idea of fibre optics as a communication medium was a topic that many physicists worldwide had been discussing. A theoretical publication in 1966 by Charles Kao and George Hockham, who were both part of a team of scientists in the Standard Telecommunications Laboratories (STL) in Harlow, Essex, defied conventional wisdom at the time predicting that glass could be made with enough purity to send signals over hundreds of kilometres. A collaboration between STL scientists and the British Post Office set out to transform the theoretical predictions into a practical demonstration. The technology trial was successful, and eventually adopted by the British Post Office.

The Hitchin-Stevenage trial demonstrated to the world that fibre optics was a viable technology, and was an important step in the development of modern fibre-optical telecommunications, ultimately leading to a Nobel Prize in Physics for Charles Kao.

== Technical Trial ==
To demonstrate the technology, an agreement was reached with the Post Office to use existing ducts to connect the telephone exchanges of two medium-sized English towns of Hitchin and Stevenage. STL scientists developed components and optimised the design of optical fibres in association with STC (Standard Telephones and Cables) Ltd. They sought a route that presented above average installation difficulties and demonstrate operation of a link operating at 140 Mb/s which was the highest digital transmission rate at the time (The European PDH E4 line rate).

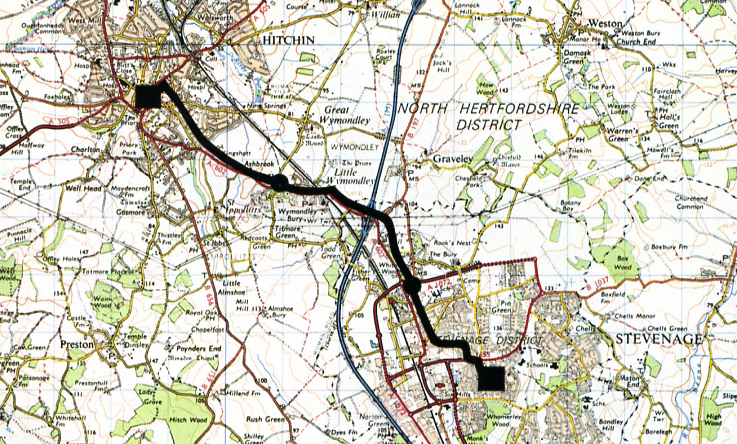
The route taken by the Hitchin-Stevenage fibre link.

The installation of the equipment between Hitchin and Stevenage started in April 1977. The total length of the route was 9 km with repeaters at 3 km spacing, and connected the exchange equipment between the two towns. The team encountered many challenges, including flooded manholes, and tight bends round which the fibre cables had to be carefully eased. The route also happened to cross a railway line and a Motorway, which gave further credence to the robustness of optical fibres. After deployment was completed, it was soon proved that the technology worked, and the transmitted signals could clearly be received at the far end of the link.

The successful outcome of the Hitchin-Stevenage trial was a pivotal moment in the history of optical communications.
