= Two-dimensional semiconductor =

Type of natural semiconductor with thicknesses on the atomic scale

A two-dimensional semiconductor (also known as 2D semiconductor) is a type of natural semiconductor with thicknesses on the atomic scale. Geim and Novoselov et al. initiated the field in 2004 when they reported graphene as a new semiconducting material, a flat monolayer of carbon atoms arranged in a 2D honeycomb lattice. A 2D monolayer semiconductor is significant because it exhibits stronger piezoelectric coupling than traditionally employed bulk forms. This coupling could enable applications. One research focus is on designing nanoelectronic components by the use of graphene as electrical conductor, hexagonal boron nitride as electrical insulator, and a transition metal dichalcogenide as semiconductor.

== Materials ==
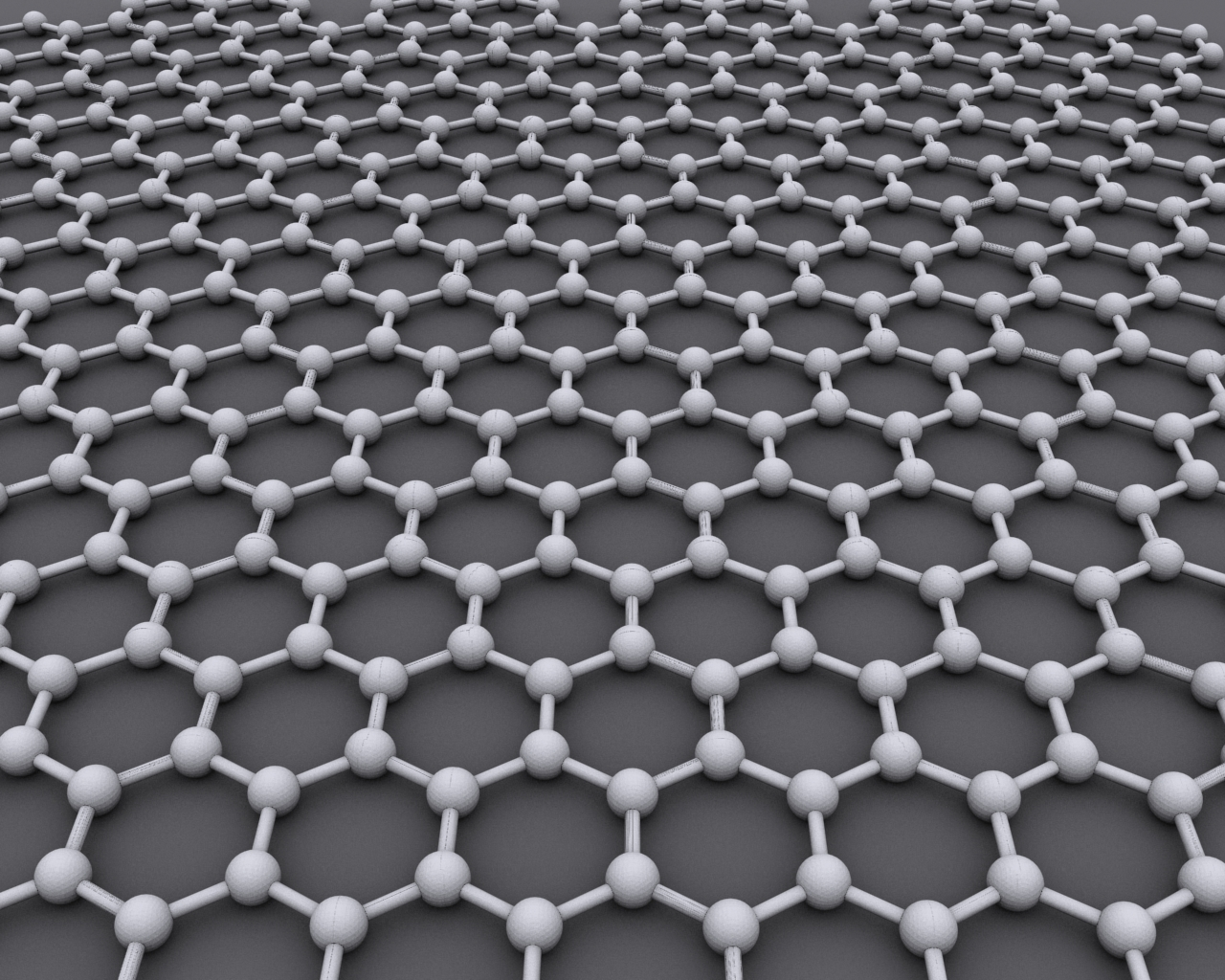
Monolayer graphene

=== Graphene ===
Graphene, consisting of single sheets of carbon atoms, has high electron mobility and high thermal conductivity. One issue regarding graphene is its lack of a band gap, which poses a problem in particular with digital electronics because it is unable to switch off field-effect transistors (FETs).

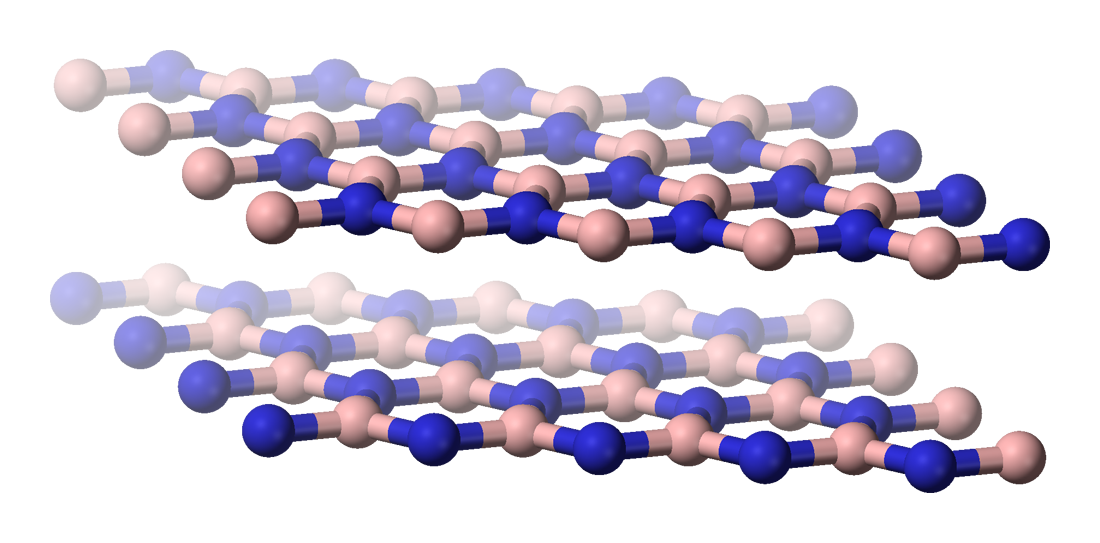
Layered structure of h-BN

=== Hexagonal boron nitride ===
Monolayer hexagonal boron nitride (h-BN) is an insulator with a high energy gap (5.97 eV). However, it can also function as a semiconductor with enhanced conductivity due to its zigzag sharp edges and vacancies. h-BN is often used as substrate and barrier due to its insulating property. h-BN also has a large thermal conductivity.

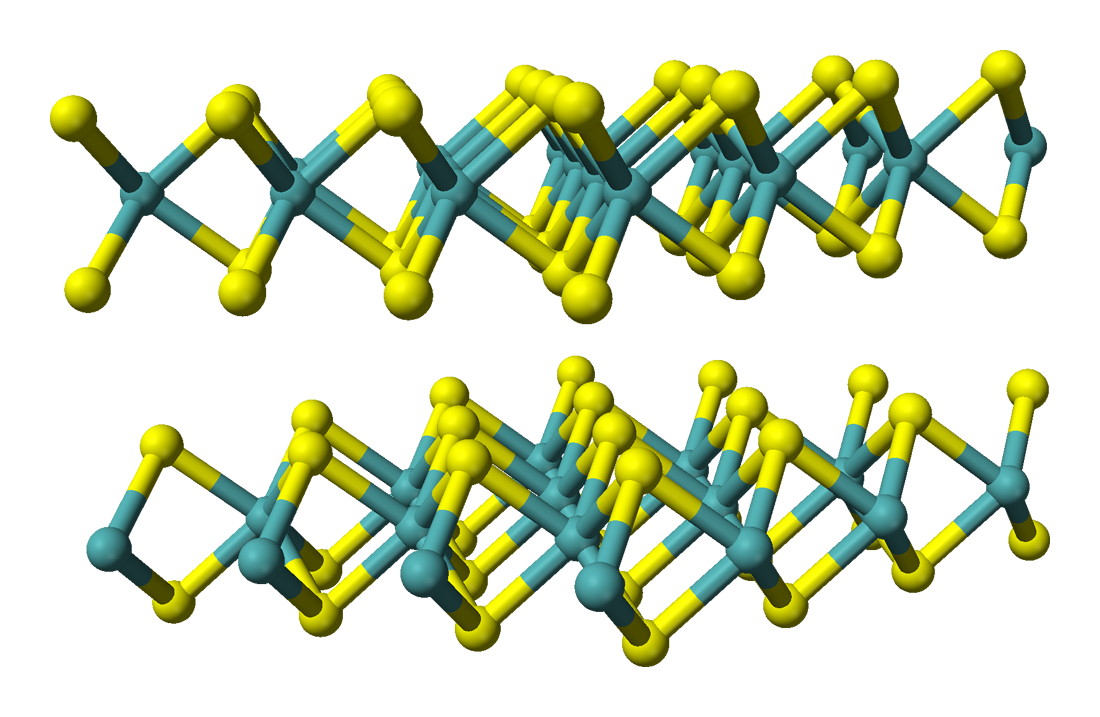
Layered structure of MoS_{2}, Mo in green, S in yellow

=== Transition-metal dichalcogenides ===
Stacks of two-dimensional materials held together by van der Waals forces can form van der Waals heterostructures, in which each atomic sheet simultaneously serves as the bulk and the interface. Interlayer charge transfer, proximity coupling, and moiré superlattice reconstruction lead to emergent properties such as secondary Dirac points in graphene/hBN and enhanced spin–orbit interaction in graphene adjacent to Transition-metal dichalcogenides.

Transition-metal dichalcogenide monolayers (TMDs or TMDCs) are a class of two-dimensional materials that have the chemical formula MX_{2}, where M represents transition metals from group IV, V and VI, and X represents a chalcogen such as sulfur, selenium or tellurium. MoS_{2}, MoSe_{2}, MoTe_{2}, WS_{2} and WSe_{2} are TMDCs. TMDCs have layered structure with a plane of metal atoms in between two planes of chalcogen atoms as shown in Figure 1. Each layer is bonded strongly in plane, but weakly in interlayers. Therefore, TMDCs can be easily exfoliated into atomically thin layers through various methods. TMDCs show layer-dependent optical and electrical properties. When exfoliated into monolayers, the band gaps of several TMDCs change from indirect to direct, which lead to broad applications in nanoelectronics, optoelectronics, and quantum computing. While exfoliated TMDC monolayers exhibit promising optoelectronic properties, they are often limited by intrinsic and extrinsic defects, such as sulfur vacancies and grain boundaries, which can negatively affect their performance. To address these issues, various chemical passivation techniques, including the use of superacids and thiol molecules, have been developed to enhance their photoluminescence and charge transport properties. Additionally, phase and strain engineering have emerged as powerful strategies to further optimize the electronic characteristics of TMDCs, making them more suitable for advanced applications in nanoelectronics and quantum computing.

=== III-VI chalcogenides ===
Another class of 2D semiconductors are III–VI chalcogenides. These materials have the chemical formula MX, where M is a metal from group 13 (Ga, In) and X is a chalcogen atom (S, Se, Te). Typical members of this group are InSe and GaSe, both of which have shown high electronic mobilities and band gaps suitable for a wide range of electronic applications.

== Synthesis ==
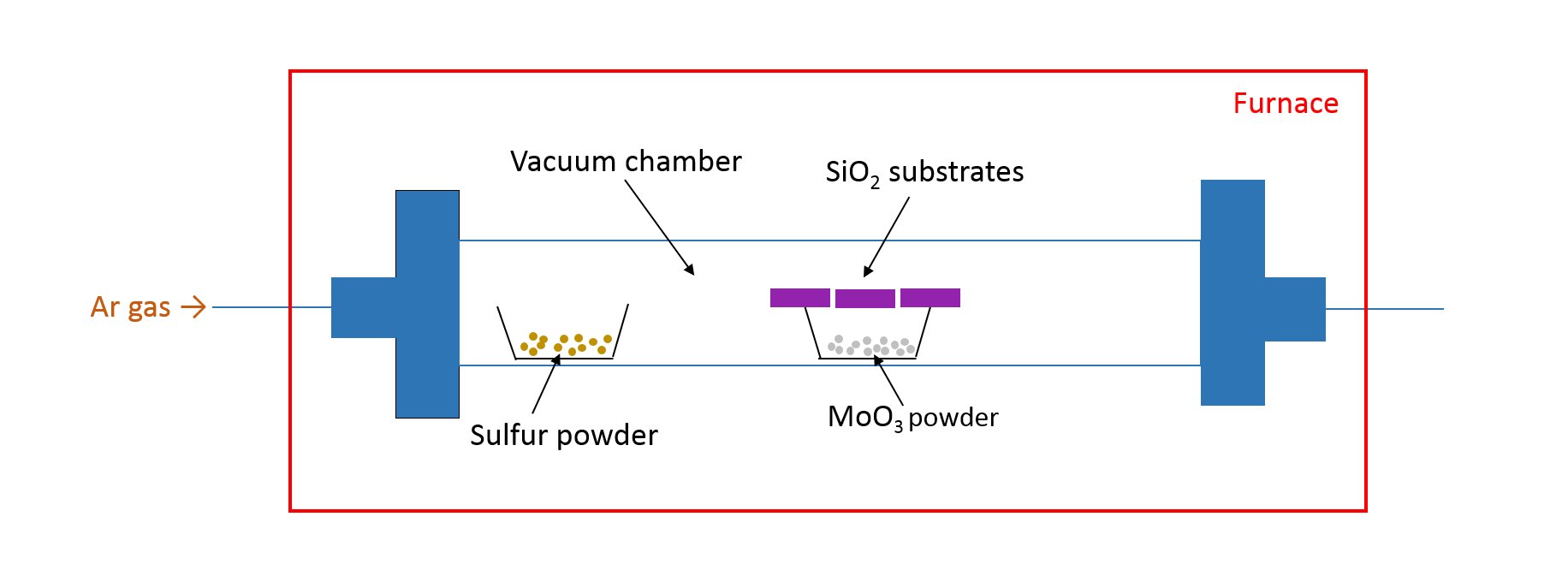
CVD setup for MoS_{2} synthesis

2D semiconductor materials are often synthesized using a chemical vapor deposition (CVD) method. Because CVD can provide large-area, high-quality, and well-controlled layered growth of 2D semiconductor materials, it also allows synthesis of two-dimensional heterojunctions. When building devices by stacking different 2D materials, mechanical exfoliation followed by transferring is often used. Other possible synthesis methods include electrochemical deposition, chemical exfoliation, hydrothermal synthesis, and thermal decomposition. In 2008 cadmium selenide CdSe quasi 2D platelets were first synthesized by colloidal method with thicknesses of several atomic layers and lateral sizes up to dozens of nanometers. Modification of the procedure allowed to obtain other nanoparticles with different compositions (like CdTe, HgSe, CdSe_{x}S_{1−x} alloys, core/shell and core/crown heterostructures) and shapes (as scrolls, nanoribbons, etc.).

== Mechanical behavior ==
2D semiconductor materials unique crystal structures often yield unique mechanical properties, especially in the monolayer limit, such as high stiffness and strength in the 2D atomic plane, but low flexural rigidity. Testing these materials is more challenging than their bulk counterparts, with methods employing the use of scanning probe techniques such as atomic force microscopy (AFM). These experimental methods are typically performed on 2D materials suspended over holes in a substrate. The tip of the AFM is then used to press into the flake and measure the response of the material. From this mechanical properties such as Young modulus, yield strain, and flexural strength.

=== Graphene ===
With a Youngs modulus of almost 1 TPa, graphene boasts incredible toughness due to the strength of the carbon-carbon bonding. Graphene however, has a fracture toughness of about 4 MPa/m, making it brittle and easy to crack . Graphene was later shown by the same group that discovered its fracture toughness, to have incredible force distribution abilities, with about ten times the ability of steel.

=== Atomically thin boron nitride ===
Monolayer boron nitride has fracture strength and Youngs modulus of 70.5 GPa and 0.865 TPa, respectively. Boron nitride also maintains its high Youngs modulus and fracture strengths with increasing thickness.

=== Transition metal dichalcogenides ===
2D transition metal dichalcogenides are often used in applications such as flexible and stretchable electronics, where an understanding of their mechanical properties and the operational impact of mechanical changes to the materials is paramount for device performance. Under strain TMDs change their electronic bandgap structure of both the direct gap monolayer and the indirect gap few layer cases indicating applied strain as a tunable parameter. Monolayer MoS_{2} has a Youngs modulus of 270 GPA and with a maximum strain of 10% before yield. In comparison, bilayer MoS2 has a Youngs modulus of 200 GPa attributed to interlayer slip. As layer number is increased further the interlayer slip is overshadowed by the bending rigidity with a Youngs modulus of 330 GPa.

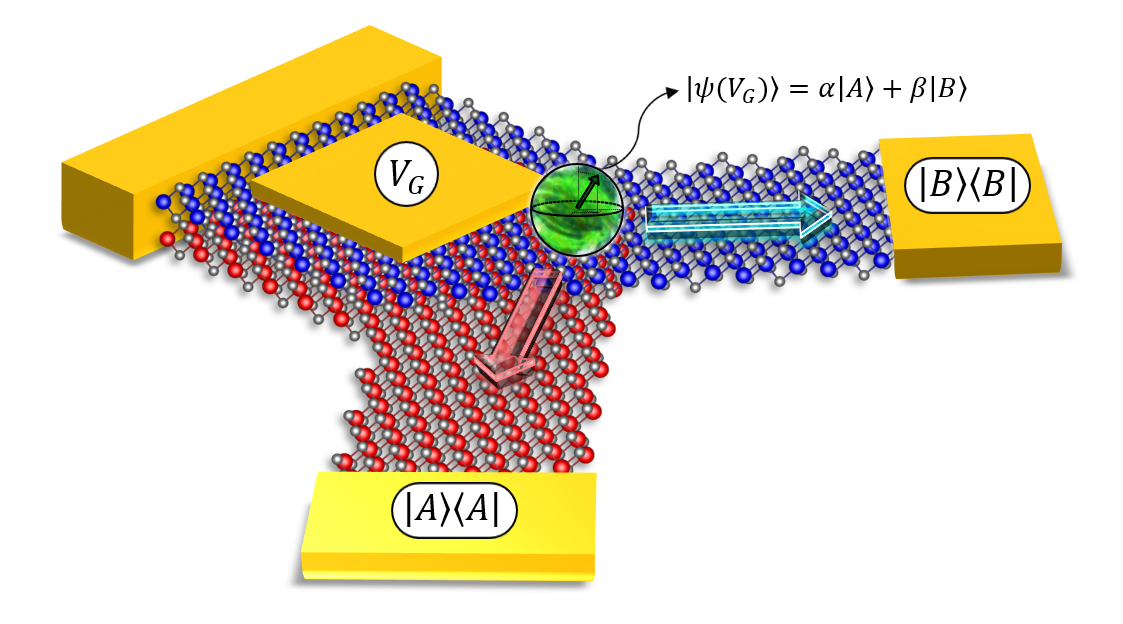
Proposed vdW qubit composed of ZrSe_{2}/SnSe_{2}. The electrode V_{G} applies the vertical electric field, changing the state of the electron in the conduction band, represented by the green Bloch sphere. Zr, Sn, and Se in red, blue, and gray, respectively.

== Proposed applications ==
Some applications include electronic devices, photonic and energy harvesting devices, and flexible and transparent substrates. Other applications include on quantum computing qubit devices, solar cells, and flexible electronics.

=== Quantum computing ===
Theoretical work has predicted the control of the band edges hybridization on some van der Waals heterostructures via electric fields and proposed its usage in quantum bit devices, considering the ZrSe_{2}/SnSe_{2} heterobilayer as an example. Further experimental work has confirmed these predictions for the case of the MoS_{2}/WS_{2} heterobilayer.

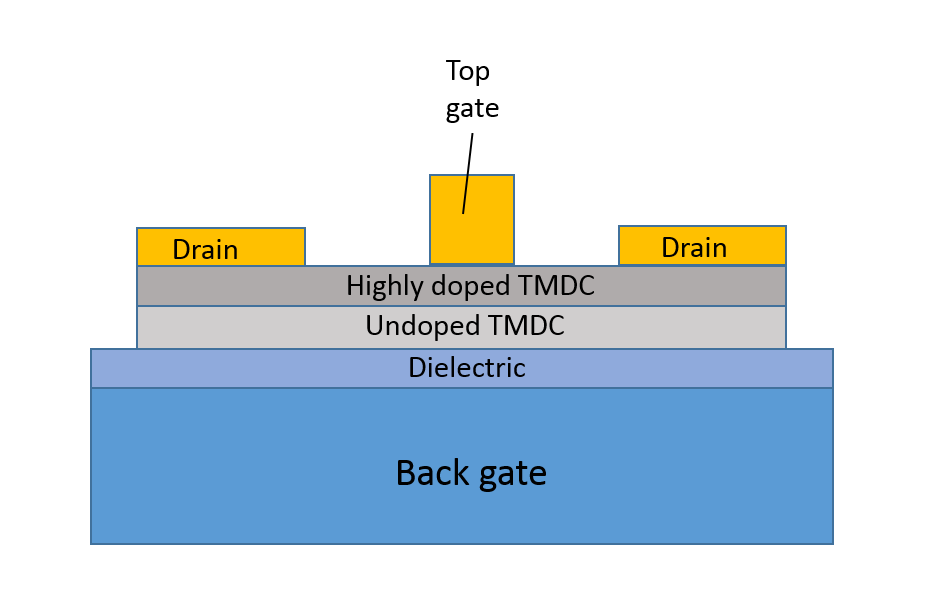
Proposed TMDC-based high-electron-mobility transistor device with top-gated Schottky contact and TMDC layers with different doping levels.

=== Magnetic NEMS ===
2D layered magnetic materials are attractive building blocks for nanoelectromechanical systems (NEMS): while they share high stiffness and strength and low mass with other 2D materials, they are magnetically active. Among the large class of newly emerged 2D layered magnetic materials, of particular interest is few-layer CrI3, whose magnetic ground state consists of antiferromagnetically coupled ferromagnetic (FM) monolayers with out-of-plane easy axis. The interlayer exchange interaction is relatively weak, a magnetic field on the order of 0.5 T in the out-of-plane (𝒛) direction can induce spin-flip transition in bilayer CrI3. Remarkable phenomena and device concepts based on detecting and controlling the interlayer magnetic state have been recently demonstrated, including spin-filter giant magnetoresistance, magnetic switching by electric field or electrostatic doping, and spin transistors. The coupling between the magnetic and mechanical properties in atomically thin materials, the basis for 2D magnetic NEMS, however, remains elusive although NEMS made of thicker magnetic materials or coated with FM metals have been studied.
