= Gallium telluride =

Gallium telluride may refer to:

- Gallium(II) telluride
- Gallium(III) telluride
