= Indium chalcogenides =

The indium chalcogenides include all compounds of indium with the chalcogen elements, oxygen, sulfur, selenium and tellurium. (Polonium is excluded as little is known about its compounds with indium). The best-characterised compounds are the In(III) and In(II) chalcogenides e.g. the sulfides In_{2}S_{3} and InS.
This group of compounds has attracted a lot of research attention because they include semiconductors, photovoltaics and phase-change materials. In many applications indium chalcogenides are used as the basis of ternary and quaternary compounds such as indium tin oxide, ITO and copper indium gallium selenide, CIGS.

Some compounds that were reported and have found their way into text books have not been substantiated by later researchers. The list of compounds below shows compounds that have been reported, and those compounds that have not had their structure determined, or whose existence has not been confirmed by the latest structural investigations, are in italics.

oxide	sulfide	selenide	telluride
In_{2}O		In_{2}Se	
	In_{4}S_{3}	In_{4}Se_{3}	In_{4}Te_{3}
	In_{5}S_{4}		
	InS	InSe	InTe
	In_{6}S_{7}	In_{6}Se_{7}	
	In_{3}S_{4}		In_{3}Te_{4}
			In_{7}Te_{10}
In_{2}O_{3}	In_{2}S_{3}	In_{2}Se_{3}	In_{2}Te_{3}
			In_{3}Te_{5}
			In_{2}Te_{5}

There are a lot of compounds, the reason for this being that indium can be present as

- In^{3+}, oxidation state +3
- In^{+}, oxidation state +1
- In^{4+}_{2} units, oxidation state of +2, also found in some indium halides, e.g. In_{2}Br_{3}.
- nonlinear In^{5+}_{3} units isoelectronic with Hg^{2+}_{3}.

The compound In_{2}Te_{5} is a polytelluride containing the Te^{2−}_{3} unit.
None of the indium chalcogenides can be described simply as ionic in nature, they all involve a degree of covalent bonding. However, in spite of this it is useful to formulate the compounds in ionic terms to get an insight into how the structures are built up. Compounds almost invariably have multiple polymorphs, that is they can crystallise in slightly different forms depending on either the method of production, or the substrate upon which they are deposited. Many of the compounds are made up of layers, and it is the different ways that the layers are stacked that is a cause of polymorphism.

== In_{2}O, In_{2}Se ==
In_{2}O is well documented. It exists in the gaseous phase and there are numerous reports of small amounts detected in the solid phase but no definitive structure has been published. It is now believed that the compound described as In_{2}Se was actually a sample of In_{4}Se_{3}.

== In_{4}S_{3}, In_{4}Se_{3}, In_{4}Te_{3} ==
In_{4}S_{3} had been reported but has more recently been re-investigated and is now believed not to exist. Both In_{4}Se_{3} and In_{4}Te_{3} are similar black crystalline solids and have been formulated to contain a non linear In^{5+}_{3} unit that is isoelectronic with Hg^{2+}_{3}. For example the selenide is formulated as In^{+}·In^{5+}_{3}·3Se^{2−}.

== In_{5}S_{4} ==
A reinvestigation showed that the original sample was actually SnIn_{4}S_{4}.

== InS, InSe, InTe ==
InS, InSe
InS and InSe are similar, both contain In^{4+}_{2} and have a layer structure. InS for instance can be formulated In_{2}^{4+}·2S^{2−}. InSe has two crystal forms β-InSe and γ-InSe that differ only in the way that the layers are stacked. InSe is a semiconductor and a phase change material and has potential as an optical recording medium.
InTe
InTe in contrast to InS and InSe is a mixed valence indium compound containing In^{+} and In^{3+} and can be formulated as In^{+}·In^{3+}·2Te^{2−}. It is similar to TlSe and has tetrahedral InTe_{4} units that share edges. It has potential for use in photovoltaic devices.

== In_{6}S_{7}, In_{6}Se_{7} ==
These compounds are isostructural, and have been formulated with indium in 3 different oxidation states, +1, +2 and +3. They have been formulated as e.g. In^{+}·In^{4+}_{2}·3In^{3+}·7S^{2−}. The indium–indium bond length in the In_{2} units are 2.741 Å (sulfide), 2.760 Å (selenide). In_{6}S_{7} is an n-type semiconductor.

== In_{3}Te_{4} ==
This compound has been reported as a superconductor. An unusual structure has been proposed that is effectively In_{4}Te_{4} but with one quarter of the indium positions vacant. There seems to be no short indium–indium distance that would indicate an In–In unit.

== In_{7}Te_{10} ==
This is formulated as In^{4+}_{2}·12In^{3+}·20Te^{2−}. The In–In distance is 2.763 Å. It has a similar structure to Ga_{7}Te_{10} and Al_{7}Te_{10}

== In_{2}S_{3}, In_{2}Se_{3}, In_{2}Te_{3} ==
In_{2}S_{3}
Indium(III) sulfide is a yellow or red high melting solid. It is an n-type semiconductor.
In_{2}Se_{3}
Indium(III) selenide is a black compound with potential optical applications.

In_{2}Te_{3}
Indium(III) telluride is a black high melting solid with applications as a semiconductor and in optical material. It has two crystalline forms, α and β.

== In_{3}Te_{5} ==
This was reported in phase studies in 1964 but its structure has not been confirmed.

== In_{2}Te_{5} ==
This is a polytelluride compound and the structure is made up of layers that in turn are made up of chains of linked InTe_{4} tetrahedra where three of the tellurium atoms are bridging. There are tellurium atoms separate from the chains. The compound has been formulated as (2In^{3+}·Te^{2−}·Te^{2−}_{3})_{n} counterbalanced with separate Te^{2−} ions. The structure is similar to Al_{2}Te_{5}.
