= Gallium lanthanum sulfide glass =

Type of glass

Gallium lanthanum sulfide glass is the name of a family of chalcogenide glasses, referred to as gallium lanthanum sulfide (Ga-La-S) glasses. They are mixtures of La_{2}S_{3}, La_{2}O_{3}, and Ga_{2}S_{3}, which form the basic glass with other glass modifiers added as needed. Gallium-lanthanum-sulfide glasses have a wide range of vitreous formation centered around a 70% Ga_{2}S_{3} : 30% La_{2}S_{3} mixture, and readily accept other modifier materials into their structure. This means that Ga-La-S composition can be adjusted to give a wide variety of optical and physical properties.

== History and physical properties ==
The glass forming ability of gallium(III) sulfide and lanthanum sulfide was discovered in 1976 by Loireau-Lozac’h, Guittard, and Flahut.

Optically, Ga-La-S has a high refractive index, a transmission window covering most of the visible wavelengths and extending to about 10 μm and a low maximum phonon energy, approx. 450 cm^{−1}.

Thermally, the refractive index of Ga-La-S glasses has a strong temperature dependence and low thermal conductivity, which results in strong thermal lensing. However, the high glass transition temperature of Ga-La-S makes it resistant to thermal damage, it has good chemical durability and unlike many chalcogenides which are based on arsenic, its glass components are non-toxic.

A clear advantage over other chalcogenides is its high lanthanum content which allows excellent rare-earth solubility and dispersion of the ions in the glass matrix for active devices. Ga-La-S can exist in both glassy and crystalline phases, in a glassy phase, it is a semiconductor with a bandgap of 2.6 eV corresponding to a wavelength of 475 nm; consequently Ga-La-S glass takes a deep orange colour. As with all chalcogenides the phase of the bulk is determined by two key factors; the material composition and the rate at which the molten material is cooled. These variables can be controlled to manipulate the final phase of the material.

== Chemistry ==
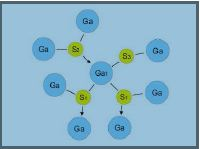
Figure 2. The covalent Ga_{2}S_{3} crystalline network.

The structure of Ga-La-S glass consists of Ga-S bonds, with a length of 0.226 nm, and La-S bonds of length 0.293 nm. It has been reported that the Ga-S bond lengths in the glassy state are identical to those in the crystalline state. Therefore, it is only necessary to change the bond angles and, thus, it is hypothesised that Ga-La-S has the potential to be a fast switching phase change memory material.

In the Ga_{2}S_{3} crystal shown in (figure 2 below) it should be noticed that two out of three sulfur atoms (S1 and S2) are each bound to three gallium atoms. These sulfur atoms have two normal covalent bonds to two of the gallium atoms. The third Ga-S bond is dative or coordinate covalent (one of the atoms provides both electrons). The third sulfur atom, S3, is bound to just two gallium atoms and is thought to be a bridging atom. The average sulfur coordination number is greater than two; sulfide glasses usually have coordination numbers less than two. Experimentally, Ga_{2}S_{3} has not been observed in a glassy state. There exists however a GaS_{4} unit within the Ga-S crystal which has been noted as the glass former. The La-S bond is ionic and likely to be a network modifier. By adding an ionic sulfide to the crystal, like La_{2}S_{3}, it is possible to modify the crystalline Ga_{2}S_{3} into a vitreous structure.

Of all the rare-earth sulfides, lanthanum gives the largest range of vitreous composites. The effect of adding an ionic sulfide modifier such as a La_{2}S_{3} molecule to the crystal is to break one of the Ga-S dative bonds and replace it with a S^{2−} anion. This anion links the gallium atom such that its tetrahedral environment is not altered, but what was a tricoordinated S atom now becomes a dicoordinated bridging atom. This process creates a negative void which can then be filled by a La^{3+} cation. Electrically, the effect of adding La_{2}S_{3} is to give the glass an essentially ionic character.

== Manufacturing ==
For both the practical application and scientific study of chalcogenide glasses, glass purity is of utmost importance. Varying levels of trace impurities, even at levels of a few parts per million can alter the spectroscopic behavior of a glass. Similarly, impurities are a major concern for optical components. Impurities in the raw materials and hence in the resulting glass, contribute to the loss of power through an optical component, whether it is in the form of a long glass fiber or an infrared window. These impurities contribute to the optical loss through absorption and scattering as well as serving as nucleation sites for crystallization.

Although high purity raw elements are now commercially available, with 99.9999% purity routine for many metals, even this level of purity is often not sufficient, particularly for optical fiber applications. More of a concern are commercially available chalcogenide compounds such as germanium sulfide, gallium sulfide or arsenic sulfide. Although these may have been synthesized from high purity elements, the conversion process itself can readily introduce oxide, water or organic impurities. It is not unheard of to find for example, commercial gallium sulphide contaminated with 45% or more gallium oxide through incomplete reaction of the precursors during production.

The conventional method for producing chalcogenide glasses is through the use of sealed ampoule melting. In this technique the required glass precursor materials are sealed under vacuum in a silica ampoule, melted, and then quenched to form a glass within the ampoule. The requirement for the sealed atmosphere is dictated by the volatile nature of many of the precursors which if melted in open atmosphere can result in large compositional changes or complete removal of components with low vapour pressures. This process also has the effect of trapping any impurities in the precursors within the glass as thus the precursor purity limits the ultimate quality of the glass that is produced. In addition, impurities can be transferred to the glass from the ampoule walls.

The closed nature of the process leads to tightly controlled quality. In addition to the open and closed systems for glass melting, chalcogenide chemical vapour deposition is emerging as a method to produce high quality chalcogenide glass, in both thin film and bulk glass form.

Gallium lanthanum sulfide glasses use essentially non-volatile components La_{2}S_{3}, La_{2}O_{3} and Ga_{2}S_{3} to form the basic glass with glass modifiers added as needed. This allows melting in an open atmosphere, under a flowing inert gas, typically argon. Batches of the compounds are prepared in a nitrogen-purged glovebox, placed in a vitreous carbon crucible and transferred to a silica tube furnace in a sealed vessel. Melting is typically at 1150 °C for 24 hours.

The molten gallium sulfides fluxed the lanthanum compounds and incorporated them into the melt at temperatures much lower than their respective melting points. The viscosity of the melt is low enough, at approximately 1 poise, to allow full mixing without the need for a rocking furnace which is required for melting in an ampoule. The melt is normally quenched to glass by pushing it into a water cooled jacket. An advantage of melting in an open atmosphere is the ability of volatile impurities to boil off and be carried away, a significant advantage over sealed systems. For example, no SH- impurity is observed in the absorption spectra of Ga-La-S glasses, compared to very significant quantities in sulphide glasses melted by the sealed ampoule technique.
