= Gallium selenide =

Gallium selenide may refer to:

- Gallium(II) selenide
- Gallium(III) selenide
