= Gallium(III) telluride =

Names
- Other names gallium telluride, gallium sesquitelluride, digallium (III) trirelluride

Identifiers
CAS Number	12024-27-0
3D model (JSmol)	Interactive image
ChemSpider	32816381
ECHA InfoCard	100.031.528
PubChem CID	14496723
CompTox Dashboard (EPA)	DTXSID401014202
- InChI: InChI=1S/2Ga.3Te Key: UUGMWEJWBHNLOH-UHFFFAOYSA-N
- SMILES: [Ga]=[Te].[Ga]=[Te].[Te]

Properties
Chemical formula	Ga_{2}Te_{3}
Molar mass	522.25 g/mol
Appearance	cubic crystals
Density	5.57 g/cm^{3}
Melting point	790 °C (1,450 °F; 1,060 K)

Related compounds
Other anions	gallium(III) oxide, gallium(III) sulfide, gallium(III) selenide, gallium triiodide
Other cations	aluminium(III) telluride, indium(III) telluride
Related compounds	gallium(II) telluride
- Except where otherwise noted, data are given for materials in their standard state (at 25 °C [77 °F], 100 kPa). verify (what is ?) Infobox references

Gallium(III) telluride (Ga_{2}Te_{3}) is a chemical compound classified as a metal telluride. At room temperature gallium(III) telluride is an odorless, black, brittle crystalline solid and is a semiconductor of the III-VI type that crystallizes in a lattice structure.

== Synthesis ==
Gallium(III) telluride is most commonly synthesized through the solid-state reaction of trimethylgallium and a telluride oxide complex under high temperatures. It is also possible to synthesize the compound by reacting elemental gallium and elemental tellurium at high temperatures.

== Properties ==
=== Physical properties ===
At room temperature, gallium(III) telluride is a black, odorless, brittle crystal. The compound crystallizes in a four-coordinate tetrahedral structure. The crystal is not immediately reactive or flammable, though serious protective ware should be worn while handling this compound (see toxicity). Gallium(III) telluride has a melting point of 788 °C to 792 °C and is not soluble in water.

=== Chemical properties ===
Gallium(III) telluride is stable at room temperature. The compound is relatively unreactive, and there are no known materials with which it is incompatible. Gallium(III) telluride will over time emit telluride fumes and it naturally decomposes. There is no risk of hazardous polymerization.

=== Toxicity ===
The toxicological properties of gallium(III) telluride have not been thoroughly investigated. However elemental tellurium has relatively low toxicity. It is converted in the body to dimethyl telluride which imparts a garlic-like odor to the breath and sweat. Heavy exposures may, in addition, result in headache, drowsiness, metallic taste, loss of appetite, nausea, tremors, convulsions, and respiratory arrest. Proper precautions should be taken when handling this compound, including lab goggles and safety gloves. This compound should be handled in a well ventilated area.

== Uses ==
=== Industrial ===
Gallium(III) telluride is a p-type semiconductor of the III-VI type. Currently its use in industry is relatively limited but further application are being explored, especially as its use in a thin film and for applications in laser diodes and solar cells.

=== Biomedical ===
The medical uses of gallium(III) telluride are still being investigated.

=== Other uses ===
Gallium(III) telluride has been used in the production of sputtering targets, used for semiconductor, chemical vapor deposition (CVD) and physical vapor deposition (PVD) display and optical applications. High-purity gallium(III) telluride is commercially available in many crystalline and polycrystalline forms.
