= Gallium sulfide =

Gallium sulfide may refer to:

- Gallium(III) sulfide, Ga_{2}S_{3}
- Gallium(II) sulfide, GaS
- Thiogallate cations containing gallium and sulfur
