= Gallium(III) selenide =

Names
- Other names gallium triselenide

Identifiers
| CAS Number | 12024-24-7 |
| 3D model (JSmol) | Interactive image |
| ChemSpider | 145438 |
| ECHA InfoCard | 100.031.527 |
| EC Number | 234-693-8 |
| PubChem CID | 165985 |
| CompTox Dashboard (EPA) | DTXSID10923276 |
- InChI: InChI=1S/2Ga.3Se/q2*+3;3*-2 Key: ZZEMEJKDTZOXOI-UHFFFAOYSA-N
- SMILES: [Ga+3].[Ga+3].[Se-2].[Se-2].[Se-2]

Properties
| Chemical formula | Ga_{2}Se_{3} |
| Molar mass | 376.33 g/mol |
| Appearance | reddish-black crystals |
| Odor | slight garlic odor |
| Density | 4.92 g/cm^{3} |
| Melting point | 1,020 °C (1,870 °F; 1,290 K) |
| Solubility in water | decomposition |

Hazards
- GHS labelling
| Pictograms | (GHS06: Toxic) (GHS08: Health hazard) (GHS09: Environmental hazard) |
| Signal word | Danger |
| Hazard statements | H301, H330, H373, H410 |
| Precautionary statements | P260, P264, P270, P271, P273, P284, P301+P310, P304+P340, P310, P314, P320, P321, P330, P391, P403+P233, P405, P501 |
| NFPA 704 (fire diamond) | 3 0 1 |

Related compounds
| Other anions | Gallium(III) oxide, Gallium(III) sulfide, Gallium tribromide, Gallium(III) telluride |
| Other cations | Aluminium(III) selenide, Indium(III) selenide |
| Related compounds | Gallium monoselenide |
- Except where otherwise noted, data are given for materials in their standard state (at 25 °C [77 °F], 100 kPa). verify (what is ?) Infobox references

Gallium(III) selenide (Ga_{2}Se_{3}) is a chemical compound. It has a defect sphalerite (cubic form of ZnS) structure. It is a p-type semiconductor

It can be formed by union of the elements. It hydrolyses slowly in water and quickly in mineral acids to form toxic hydrogen selenide gas. The reducing capabilities of the selenide ion make it vulnerable to oxidizing agents. It is advised therefore that it not come into contact with bases.
