= Gallium(II) telluride =

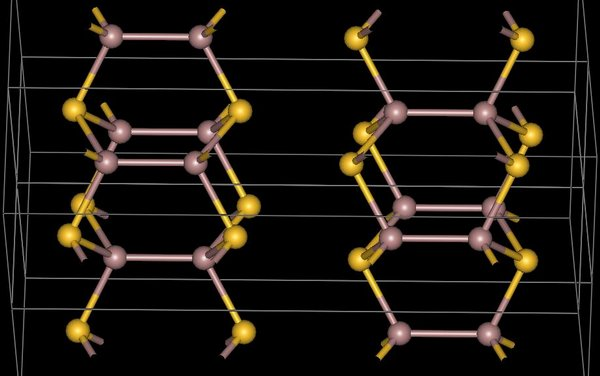
- Gallium(II) telluride

Names
- Other names gallium telluride

Identifiers
CAS Number	12024-14-5
3D model (JSmol)	Interactive image
ChemSpider	28468137
ECHA InfoCard	100.031.524
EC Number	234-690-1
PubChem CID	14496722
CompTox Dashboard (EPA)	DTXSID701014201
- InChI: InChI=1S/Ga.Te Key: OFIYHXOOOISSDN-UHFFFAOYSA-N
- SMILES: [Te]=[Ga][Ga]=[Te]

Properties
Chemical formula	GaTe
Molar mass	197.32 g/mol
Appearance	black pieces
Density	5.44 g/cm^{3}, solid
Melting point	824 °C (1,515 °F; 1,097 K)

Structure
Crystal structure	hexagonal, hP8
Space group	P6_{3}/mmc, No. 194

Hazards
NFPA 704 (fire diamond)	4 0 0

Related compounds
Other anions	gallium(II) oxide, gallium(II) sulfide, gallium monoselenide
Other cations	zinc(II) telluride, germanium(II) telluride, indium(II) telluride
Related compounds	gallium(III) telluride
- Except where otherwise noted, data are given for materials in their standard state (at 25 °C [77 °F], 100 kPa). verify (what is ?) Infobox references

Gallium(II) telluride, GaTe, is a chemical compound of gallium and tellurium. There is research interest in the structure and electronic properties of GaTe because of the possibility that it, or related compounds, may have applications in the electronics industry. Gallium telluride can be made by reacting the elements or by metal organic vapour deposition (MOCVD).

GaTe produced from the elements has a monoclinic crystal structure. Each gallium atom is tetrahedrally coordinated by 3 tellurium and one gallium atom. The gallium-gallium bond length in the Ga_{2} unit is 2.43 Angstrom. The structure consists of layers and can be formulated as Ga_{2}^{4+} 2Te^{2−}. The bonding within the layers is ionic-covalent and between the layers is predominantly van der Waals. GaTe is classified as a layered semiconductor (like GaSe and InSe which have similar structures). It is a direct band gap semiconductor with an energy of 1.65eV at room temperature. A hexagonal form can be produced by low pressure metal organic vapour deposition (MOCVD) from alkyl gallium telluride cubane-type clusters e.g. from (t-butylGa( μ_{3}-Te))_{4}. The core consists of a cube of eight atoms, four gallium, and four tellurium atoms. Each gallium has an attached t-butyl group and three adjacent tellurium atoms and each tellurium has three adjacent gallium atoms. The hexagonal form, which is closely related to the monoclinic form, containing Ga_{2}^{4+} units, converts to the monoclinic form when annealed at 500 °C.
