= AgInSbTe =

Phase-changing material

AgInSbTe, or silver-indium-antimony-tellurium, is a phase change material from the group of chalcogenide glasses, used in rewritable optical discs (such as rewritable CDs) and phase-change memory applications. It is a quaternary compound of silver, indium, antimony, and tellurium.

During writing, the material is first erased, initialized into its crystalline state, with long, lower-intensity laser irradiation. The material heats up to its crystallization temperature, but not up to its melting point, and crystallizes in a metastable face-centered cubic structure. Then the information is written on the crystalline phase, by heating spots of it with short (<10 ns), high-intensity laser pulses; the material locally melts and is quickly cooled, remaining in the amorphous phase. As the amorphous phase has lower reflectivity than the crystalline phase, the bitstream can be recorded as "dark" amorphous spots on the crystalline background. At low linear velocities, clusters of crystalline material can exist in the amorphous spots. Another similar material is GeSbTe, offering a lower linear density, but with higher overwrite cycles by 1-2 orders of magnitude. It is used in pit-and-groove recording formats, often in rewritable DVDs.
