= Photomixing =

Photomixing is a process that uses two laser beams with slightly different optical frequencies to generate radiation at the difference frequency. Depending on the photomixing process and method, the frequency of the radiation produced by this method can vary from near DC to several THz. An advantage of this technique is the ability to produce high spectral purity radiation over a very large range of frequencies. A disadvantage is the typically low power levels of less than 10^{−8} W.

== Principle ==
Photomixing is the generation of continuous-wave radiation through a process in which two frequency-offset lasers with aligned polarization illuminate a photomixer. The total electrical field of the exciting beam in the photomixing material may be written as:

$$E(t)=\sum_{i=1}^{2} A_i \cos\!\big(\omega_i t+\phi_i\big)\,\hat{e}_i$$

where $\omega_i$ is the angular frequency of the laser beam $i$, $A_i$ its amplitude, $\hat{e}_i$ the unit vector along the direction of polarization of the laser beam $i$, and $\phi_i$ the phase difference between the two beams. Depending on the material employed, photomixing can occur via two different processes: a non-linear optical process where the laser beams generate radiation at the difference frequency or a linear optical process where the laser beams modulate the conductance of an antenna integrated into a semiconductor material.

Non-linear optical process. In nonlinear dielectric crystals, photo-mixing is a second-order nonlinear process that produces a nonlinear field

$$P^{(2)}(t)=\boldsymbol{\chi}^{(2)} : E(t)E(t)$$

where $\boldsymbol{\chi}^{(2)}$ is a conversion tensor, and “:” denotes the tensorial product. The radiation generation by the non-linear process results from the beating term (frequency difference) $\Delta\omega=\left|\omega_1-\omega_2\right|$.

As the two laser beams and the generated radiation propagate in the crystal the intensity of the generated radiation is:

$$I(\Omega)\propto I_1 I_2\, n(\Omega)\, d_{\mathrm{eff}}^{\,2}\,\frac{\sin^2(\Delta k\,z/2)}{(\Delta k/2)^2}$$

where $\Omega=\Delta\omega$ is the generated angular frequency, $I_{1,2}$ are respectively the intensities of laser beams 1 and 2, $n(\Omega)$ is the crystal refractive index at $\Omega$, $z$ is the propagation distance, $d_{\mathrm{eff}}$ is the effective nonlinear coefficient (a function of the nonlinear tensor coefficients $\chi^{(2)}_{ijk}$ and of the polarization angles), and $\Delta k$ is the wave-vector mismatch. When $\Delta k=0$ the generated radiation at a given location in the crystal is in phase and adds constructively. In the case of phase-mismatch ($\Delta k\neq 0$) the signal is weaker or zero and varies periodically with $z$. If the two laser beams at frequencies $\omega_1$ and $\omega_2$ are collinear, the generated radiation propagates in the same direction and the phase matching condition is simply expressed as:

$k(\omega_1)-k(\omega_2)-k(\Omega)=0$.

Generally, the efficiency of non-linear photomixing in dielectric crystals is rather weak, because the nonlinear susceptibility is small and because of energy conservation in photon-interaction (Manley–Rowe) relations:

$$\frac{\Delta P_{\mathrm{THz}}}{\Delta P_{\mathrm{pump}}}=\frac{\hbar\Omega}{\hbar\omega}\ll 1$$

Here $\Delta P_{\mathrm{pump}}$ is the diminution of pump-beam power due to the nonlinear process, while $\Delta P_{\mathrm{THz}}$ is the increase of THz power. Since $\Omega\ll\omega$, the photon (quantum) efficiency is

$$\eta\approx \frac{\Omega}{\omega}$$

and is therefore small at optical-to-THz frequency ratios. When the lasers operate in the visible range, $\eta$ is on the order of $10^{-3}$ and total conversion efficiency is low (e.g., $0.5\times 10^{-9}\ \mathrm{W}^{-1}$ with GaP pumped around 1 µm).

Linear optical process. Historically, semiconductor photomixers have been fabricated from low-temperature-grown gallium arsenide (LTG-GaAs). The double laser beam illuminates the center of an antenna sputtered onto the semiconductor. Illuminating with optical radiation of photon energy greater than the semiconductor bandgap (and within the absorption range) creates a free photo-carrier population. For LTG-GaAs typical wavelengths are shorter than 850 nm. If the photo-carrier lifetime $\tau$ is shorter than the period of the mixing product, the photo-density varies at the optical beat frequency. A voltage applied to the antenna structure accelerates the carriers through the antenna and produces a radiating wave at the difference frequency of the two lasers. The radiated (load) power from the antenna can be written:

$$P_{\mathrm{THz}} \propto \frac{R_L}{1+\omega^2 C^2 \tau^2}\,\eta\,P_{\mathrm{opt}}$$

where $R_L$ is the load resistance, $C$ is the antenna-gap capacitance, $\tau$ is the photo-carrier lifetime, $P_{\mathrm{opt}}$ is the pump-laser power and $\eta$ is the optical/electrical conversion efficiency in the semiconductor. Such devices show a broad spectral emissivity, with a maximum around 0.8–1 THz, which spreads up to ~3 THz. Typically, ~1 µW of power is delivered around 1 THz. They are used as tunable local oscillators and broadband THz sweep sources in spectroscopy applications. Generally, the photomixer bias is modulated to allow the use of lock-in detection techniques.

Because of the abundance (and low cost) of components available for fiber-optic communications, significant work has been performed to develop photomixing materials that operate at wavelengths around 1550 nm. For instance, LTG-InGaAs/InAlAs photo-mixers exhibit similar performance to LTG-GaAs at 850 nm, as do Erbium-based devices, although devices constructed from these materials can be less robust than LTG-GaAs devices.

The generation of radiation via illumination at 1550 nm can also be achieved through mixing in PIN diodes or uni-travelling-carrier (UTC) diodes. In UTC diodes, contrary to PN or PIN diodes, only free electrons participate in the photo-electrical response. Therefore, UTC diodes exhibit a very fast response time and can be used for THz photo-mixing. Thanks to efficient photo-electron collection and the fast mobility in InP/InGaAs semiconductors, 80 µW at 0.3 THz (2.6 µW at 1 THz) has been produced by Ito et al.

== High resolution spectrometer ==
The photomixing source can then form the basis of a laser spectrometer which can be used to examine the THz signature of various subjects such as gases, liquids or solid materials.

The instrument can be divided into the following functional units:

- Laser sources which provide a THz beatnote in the optical domain. These are usually two near infrared lasers and maybe an optical amplifier.
- The photomixer device converts the beatnote into THz radiation, often emitted into free space by an integrated antenna.
- A THz propagation path, depending on the application suitable focusing elements are used to collimate the THz beam and allow it to pass through the sample under study.
- Detector, with the relatively low levels of available power, in the order of 1 μW, a sensitive detector is required to ensure a reasonable signal to noise ratio. Si bolometers provide a solution for in-coherent instruments. Alternatively a second photomixer device can be used as a detector and has the advantage of allowing coherent detection.

== History of photomixing ==
A review of the history of photomixing can be found in Fundamentals of THz Devices and Applications by Peytavit et al. Some selected milestones in the development of photomixing are:

- 1955 – First experimental demonstration by Forrester et al. Because of the lack of coherent sources, they used two Zeeman components of a mercury lamp, resulting in a 10 GHz beat frequency detected with a photoelectric tube whose SbCs₃ photocathode acted as the mixer.
- 1962 – Shortly after demonstrating the first He–Ne laser, Javan et al. performed mixing of two single-mode He–Ne lasers (5 MHz) on the photocathode of a photomultiplier. Their goal was to study the spectral width of the laser beam rather than to produce microwaves.
- 1962 – Inaba and Siegman reported the first use of a PIN-junction photodiode as an optical mixer.
- 1995 – A major breakthrough by Brown et al. demonstrated photomixing in low-temperature-grown GaAs (LTG-GaAs). Using an interdigitated-electrode photoswitch on an LTG-GaAs wafer pumped by two Ti:Al₂O₃ lasers (λ ≈ 0.8 µm), they generated THz radiation up to 3.8 THz, producing 4 µW at 300 GHz and 1 µW at 800 GHz. This was enabled by the material's sub-picosecond carrier lifetime, high electron mobility (~150 cm^{2}/V·s), and high electric-field breakdown (~300 kV/cm).
- 2003 – Ito et al. achieved about 80 µW at 300 GHz and 2.6 µW at 1 THz using InP-based uni-traveling-carrier photodiodes (UTC-PDs).
- 2016 – Aalto University reported the development of a cryogenic photomixing THz spectrometer utilizing fiber-coupled photomixers capable of operating at temperatures as low as 4.5 K.

Thanks to these developments, and to advances in laser stability and THz antenna design, commercial frequency-domain THz spectrometers based on photomixing are now available from several manufacturers.
