= Indium(III) selenide =

Names
- IUPAC name Indium(III) selenide
- Other names indium selenide, indium sesquiselenide

Identifiers
CAS Number	12056-07-4
3D model (JSmol)	Interactive image
ChemSpider	145480
ECHA InfoCard	100.031.821
EC Number	235-016-9
PubChem CID	166055
CompTox Dashboard (EPA)	DTXSID00923467
- InChI: InChI=1S/2In.3Se/q2*+3;3*-2 Key: AKUCEXGLFUSJCD-UHFFFAOYSA-N
- SMILES: [Se-2].[Se-2].[Se-2].[In+3].[In+3]

Properties
Chemical formula	In_{2}Se_{3}
Molar mass	466.516 g/mol
Appearance	black crystalline solid
Density	5.80 g/cm³

Hazards
- GHS labelling
Pictograms	(GHS06: Toxic) (GHS08: Health hazard) (GHS09: Environmental hazard)
Signal word	Danger
Hazard statements	H301, H331, H373, H410
Precautionary statements	P260, P264, P270, P271, P273, P301+P316, P304+P340, P316, P319, P321, P330, P391, P403+P233, P405, P501
- Except where otherwise noted, data are given for materials in their standard state (at 25 °C [77 °F], 100 kPa). verify (what is ?) Infobox references

Indium(III) selenide is a compound of indium and selenium. It has potential for use in photovoltaic devices and has been the subject of extensive research. The two most common phases, α and β, have a layered structure, while γ has a "defect wurtzite structure." In all, five polymorphs are known: α, β, γ, δ, κ. The α-β phase transition is accompanied by a change in electrical conductivity. The band gap of γ-In_{2}Se_{3} is approximately 1.9 eV.

== Preparation ==
The method of production influences the polymorph generated. For example, thin films of pure γ-In_{2}Se_{3} have been produced from trimethylindium (InMe_{3}) and hydrogen selenide via MOCVD techniques.

3 H_{2}Se + 2 In(CH_{3})_{3} → In_{2}Se_{3} + 6 CH_{4}

A conventional route entails heating the elements in a sealed tube:

3 Se + 2 In → In_{2}Se_{3}

== See also ==
- Gallium(III) selenide
- Indium chalcogenides
- Nanoparticle

== General references ==
- WebElements

Greenwood, Norman N.; Earnshaw, Alan (1997). Chemistry of the Elements (2nd ed.). Butterworth-Heinemann. doi:10.1016/C2009-0-30414-6. ISBN 978-0-08-037941-8.
