= Indium(III) sulfide =

Names
- Other names Indium sesquisulfide Diindium trisulfide

Identifiers
CAS Number	12030-24-9
3D model (JSmol)	Interactive image
ChemSpider	17617491
ECHA InfoCard	100.031.571
PubChem CID	160966
UNII	N0U96UKW4A
CompTox Dashboard (EPA)	DTXSID20423030
- InChI: InChI=1S/2In.3S Key: ZOMNDSJRWSNDFL-UHFFFAOYSA-N; InChI=1/2In.3S/rIn2S3/c3-1-5-2-4 Key: ZOMNDSJRWSNDFL-YYMIQOPKAJ
- SMILES: S=[In]S[In]=S

Properties
Chemical formula	In_{2}S_{3}
Molar mass	325.82 g·mol^{−1}
Appearance	red powder
Density	4.90 g cm^{−3}, solid
Melting point	1,050 °C (1,920 °F; 1,320 K)
Solubility in water	insoluble

Hazards
- GHS labelling
Pictograms	(GHS07: Exclamation mark)
Signal word	Warning
Hazard statements	H302+H332, H315, H319, H335
Precautionary statements	P280, P301+P330+P331, P302+P352, P304+P340, P312, P332+P313, P337+P313
NFPA 704 (fire diamond)	3 4 2
- Except where otherwise noted, data are given for materials in their standard state (at 25 °C [77 °F], 100 kPa). verify (what is ?) Infobox references

Indium(III) sulfide (Indium sesquisulfide, Indium sulfide (2:3), Indium (3+) sulfide) is the inorganic compound with the formula In_{2}S_{3}.

It has a "rotten egg" odor characteristic of sulfur compounds, and produces hydrogen sulfide gas when reacted with mineral acids.

Three different structures ("polymorphs") are known: yellow, α-In_{2}S_{3} has a defect cubic structure, red β-In_{2}S_{3} has a defect spinel, tetragonal, structure, and γ-In_{2}S_{3} has a layered structure. The red, β, form is considered to be the most stable form at room temperature, although the yellow form may be present depending on the method of production. In_{2}S_{3} is attacked by acids and by sulfide. It is slightly soluble in Na_{2}S.

Indium sulfide was the first indium compound ever described, being reported in 1863. Reich and Richter determined the existence of indium as a new element from the sulfide precipitate.

== Structure and properties ==
In_{2}S_{3} features tetrahedral In(III) centers linked to four sulfido ligands.

α-In_{2}S_{3} has a defect cubic structure. The polymorph undergoes a phase transition at 420 °C and converts to the spinel structure of β-In_{2}S_{3}. Another phase transition at 740 °C produces the layered γ-In_{2}S_{3} polymorph.

β-In_{2}S_{3} has a defect spinel structure. The sulfide anions are closely packed in layers, with octahedrally-coordinated In(III) cations present within the layers, and tetrahedrally-coordinated In(III) cations between them. A portion of the tetrahedral interstices are vacant, which leads to the defects in the spinel.

β-In_{2}S_{3} has two subtypes. In the T-In_{2}S_{3} subtype, the tetragonally-coordinated vacancies are in an ordered arrangement, whereas the vacancies in C-In_{2}S_{3} are disordered. The disordered subtype of β-In_{2}S_{3} shows activity for photocatalytic H_{2} production with a noble metal cocatalyst, but the ordered subtype does not.

β-In_{2}S_{3} is an N-type semiconductor with an optical band gap of 2.1 eV. It has been proposed to replace the hazardous cadmium sulfide, CdS, as a buffer layer in solar cells, and as an additional semiconductor to increase the performance of TiO_{2}-based photovoltaics.

The unstable γ-In_{2}S_{3} polymorph has a layered structure.

== Production ==
Indium sulfide is usually prepared by direct combination of the elements.

Production from volatile complexes of indium and sulfur, for example dithiocarbamates (e.g. Et_{2}In^{III}S_{2}CNEt_{2}), has been explored for vapor deposition techniques.

Thin films of the beta complex can be grown by chemical spray pyrolysis. Solutions of In(III) salts and organic sulfur compounds (often thiourea) are sprayed onto preheated glass plates, where the chemicals react to form thin films of indium sulfide. Changing the temperature at which the chemicals are deposited and the In:S ratio can affect the optical band gap of the film.

Single-walled indium sulfide nanotubes can be formed in the laboratory, by the use of two solvents (one in which the compound dissolves poorly and one in which it dissolves well). There is partial replacement of the sulfido ligands with O^{2−}, and the compound forms thin nanocoils, which self-assemble into arrays of nanotubes with diameters on the order of 10 nm, and walls approximately 0.6 nm thick. The process mimics protein crystallization.

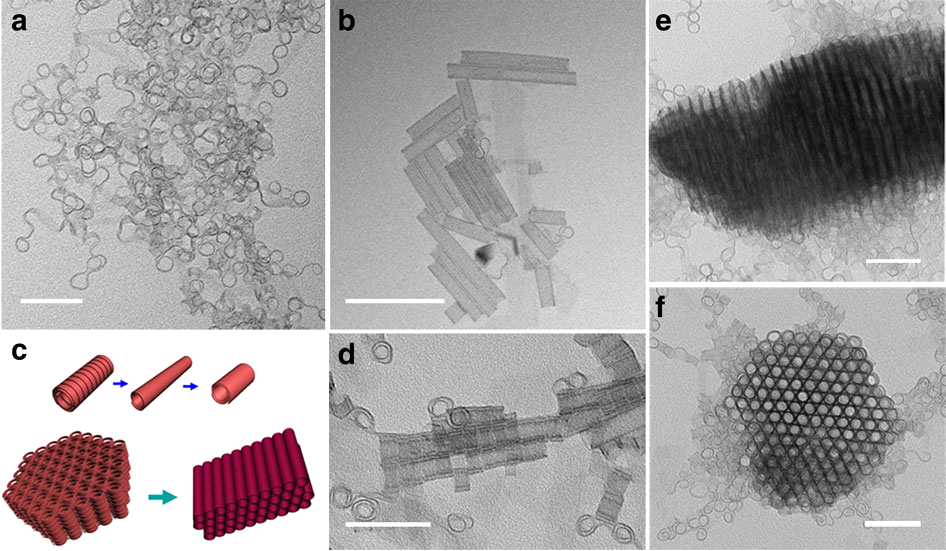
Indium(III) sulfide nanocoils (a), nanotubes (b), and their ordered arrays (d-f). Scale bars: a,d,e,f - 50 nm; b - 100 nm.

== Safety ==
The β-In_{2}S_{3} polymorph, in powdered form, can irritate eyes, skin and respiratory organs. It is toxic if swallowed, but can be handled safely under conventional laboratory conditions. It should be handled with gloves, and care should be taken to keep from inhaling the compound, and to keep it from contact with the eyes.

== Applications ==
=== Photovoltaic and Photocatalytic ===
There is considerable interest in using In_{2}S_{3} to replace the semiconductor CdS (cadmium sulfide) in photoelectronic devices. β-In_{2}S_{3} has a tunable band gap, which makes it attractive for photovoltaic applications, and it shows promise when used in conjunction with TiO_{2} in solar panels, indicating that it could replace CdS in that application as well. Cadmium sulfide is toxic and must be deposited with a chemical bath, but indium(III) sulfide shows few adverse biological effects and can be deposited as a thin film through less hazardous methods.

Thin films β-In_{2}S_{3} can be grown with varying band gaps, which make them widely applicable as photovoltaic semiconductors, especially in heterojunction solar cells.

Plates coated with beta-In_{2}S_{3} nanoparticles can be used efficiently for PEC (photoelectrochemical) water splitting.

=== Biomedical ===
A preparation of indium sulfide made with the radioactive ^{113}In can be used as a lung scanning agent for medical imaging. It is taken up well by lung tissues, but does not accumulate there.

=== Other ===
In_{2}S_{3} nanoparticles luminesce in the visible spectrum. Preparing In_{2}S_{3} nanoparticles in the presence of other heavy metal ions creates highly efficient blue, green, and red phosphors, which can be used in projectors and instrument displays.

== General references ==
- WebElements
- Greenwood, Norman N.; Earnshaw, Alan (1997). Chemistry of the Elements (2nd ed.). Butterworth-Heinemann. doi:10.1016/C2009-0-30414-6. ISBN 978-0-08-037941-8.
