= George Hockham =

English engineer

George Alfred Hockham FREng FIET (7 December 1938 – 16 September 2013) was an English engineer. He worked for over 40 years in theoretical analysis and design techniques applied to the solution of electromagnetic problems covering many different antenna types for radar, electronic warfare and communication systems. He coauthored the original paper on the application of cladded glass fibre as a transmission medium.

== Biography ==
Born in Epsom, Surrey, Hockham received a BSc (Eng) degree from the Regent Street Polytechnic in 1961, and a PhD in 1969 from the Queen Mary University of London. He worked for over 40 years in theoretical analysis and design techniques applied to the solution of electromagnetic problems covering many different antenna types for radar, electronic warfare and communication systems.

Hockham also contributed significantly to the development of optical fibres for long-distance communications systems. He proposed and published, together with a colleague Professor K. C. Kao, in 1966 the original paper on the application of the cladded glass fibre as the transmission medium – "Dielectric-fibre surface waveguides for optical frequencies" – for which he received the Rank Prize in Opto-Electronics in 1978. He is the holder of 16 scientific/technical patents and authored and co-authored 26 papers published in professional journals. He was previously Technical Director of Thorn EMI Electronics, Sensors Group, Technical Director in Plessey Radar, Director of Technology Plessey Electronics Systems and Manager of the Antenna and Microwave Laboratory, ITT Gilfillan, Los Angeles, Member of Advisory committees to the MoD and Academia and a visiting professor at Queen Mary, University of London.

== Family and hobbies ==
George Alfred Hockham was born in 1938 in Epsom, Surrey, the only child of George and Elizabeth Hockham (née Elliott). His parents moved to Enfield when he was 6 months old and that is where he spent his childhood and early adulthood. He attended the local Albany Boys' Secondary School and later Regent Street Polytechnic where he obtained a BSc in electrical engineering. He started work at STL Harlow as a young graduate engineer in 1961.

He met his wife Mary in 1962 and they were married in 1964. Following his marriage he produced the most creative and productive work of his life. Two daughters and two sons were born in the next nine years. Cyril Connolly may well have deemed the pram in the hall the enemy of creativity but Hockham co-authored the paper that started it all in 1966. Fibre optics has changed the modern communications world.

Hockham was a keen swimmer in his youth and swam for his school and county. He later swam for STL Harlow in inter-companies competitions. He was also an enthusiastic member of the Regent Street Polytechnic Water Polo team during his undergraduate days – some would say too enthusiastic, spending more time in the water than at study. On giving up swimming he took up amateur motor cycle racing . He was a keen follower of Motor cycle racing and Formula 1 car racing.

== Awards and achievements ==
- Authored and co-authored 26 papers published in professional journals, including what is widely reported as the pioneering paper in fibre optics in 1966 the original paper – Dielectric Fibre Surface Waveguides for Optical Frequencies – with Charles Kao.
- PhD from University of London (1969)
- BSc(Eng) Regent Street Polytechnic (1961)
- Featured in BBC programme Tomorrow's World
- Rank Prize for Opto-Electronics 6 March 1978
- Visiting Professor Queen Mary, University of London
- Honorary Professor Beijing University of Posts and Telecommunications in the field of Microwave and Lightwave Communication (2008)
- Featured in Science Museum (London)
- Featured in British Genius Exhibition (1977)
- Fellow Institution of Electrical Engineers (1987)
- Fellow Royal Academy of Engineering (1995)
- Holder of 16 scientific / technical patents

== Work history ==
Hockham joined Standard Telecommunication Laboratories (STL) in Harlow following graduation in September 1961 working in the Microwave laboratory under Professor A E Karbowiak. The work here was on Trunk communication systems. During this period with the advent of the LASER there was now available an optical coherent source. By adopting optical frequencies that allowed much higher bandwidth for the transmission of information and the emphasis switched to one of finding a suitable optical waveguide. Several options were considered, the thin film waveguide proposed by Karbowiak which Hockham worked on but had the limitation that the electromagnetic field could not be contained laterally and proved to be of limited use. Another colleague investigated a confocal lens system. This comprised a periodic array of lenses displaced longitudinally where in theory the light beam was focused periodically. This too proved to be unacceptable as the whole structure had to be contained within a controlled environment e.g. as soon as the temperature changed along the axis the beam was directed away from the axial direction and the light beam was lost- another failure.

At this time Professor Karbowiak left STL in 1964 and took up a position at the University of New South Wales in Sydney. Charles K. Kao was transferred into the group and he started looking at other options in particular the fibre.

Hockham started looking at the theoretical aspects in particular the loss due to discontinuities in the fibre and also the loss incurred when the fibre was curved, both were known to affect the performance and needed to be quantified as any one of these could have rendered the fibre approach unacceptable. The single fibre would need to be less than 1 micrometre in diameter to preserve single mode operation and also most of the energy is carried outside the fibre core to preserve the low loss, this too was a non-starter. However, if the core was surrounded by a cladding whose refractive index was close to that of the core a larger structure (in relative terms) could be accommodated. In this case most of the energy is now contained in the core and cladding regions of the fibre thus returning to the high losses. Charles Kao's part of the joint project was to investigate the losses in the glass material to determine if this could be reduced. All parts of the programme were successful leading now to a viable solution of a fibre optic communication system.
