= George Horace Brooke Thompson =

British semiconductor laser physicist

- Born: 2nd March 1928; Beckenham, Kent
- Died: 18th July 2025; Harlow, Essex
- Resting place: Sawbridgeworth, Hertfordshire
- Education: Queen's College, Cambridge, University of Cambridge, University of Oxford
- Known for: Gallium arsenide semiconductor lasers
- Awards: J. J. Thomson Medal (1992)
- Scientific career
- Workplaces: Standard Telecommunication Laboratories (STL), Bell-Northern Research (BNR), Nortel Networks

George Horace Brooke Thompson (March 1928 – July 2025), known as Robin Thompson, was a British physicist whose research focused on semiconductor lasers, optical waveguides and optical devices.

His published work included semiconductor-laser filamentation, multilayer heterostructures, far-field emission and distributed-feedback laser modelling. In 1992 he received the J. J. Thomson Medal for Electronics for his work on semiconductor lasers and optical devices.

Thompson was also the author of the 1980 monograph Physics of Semiconductor Laser Devices, which was reviewed in Nature, Physics Today and Electronics and Power; reviewing it in the latter, D. H. Newman wrote that the book was "much more than a review" and said that specialist semiconductor-laser researchers would find "a wealth of knowledge and ideas" in it.

== Education and early career ==
A local memorial published after Thompson's death states that he was born in March 1928 and studied at the universities of Cambridge and Oxford.

By 1955 Thompson was working at Standard Telecommunication Laboratories in Enfield. That year he published a paper in Nature concerning unusual wave-propagation characteristics in magnetised ferrites. His subsequent work at the company's Harlow laboratories concentrated on semiconductor lasers and related optical devices. By 1994 his affiliation was given as BNR Europe Ltd, Harlow.

== Semiconductor-laser research ==
In 1972, Thompson published a theoretical treatment of self-focusing and filament formation in semiconductor lasers. The model related the phenomenon to variations in dielectric constant caused by changes in injected carrier density and predicted that filament width would contract as current increased.

In work with P. A. Kirkby, Thompson developed a model relating the far-field emission pattern of a double-heterostructure laser to its waveguide parameters. Their experiments showed that the addition of a passive layer could reduce the measured half-power angular width of the emitted beam. Thompson and Kirkby subsequently analysed four- and five-layer gallium-aluminium-arsenide/gallium-arsenide heterostructures in which optical distribution and carrier confinement could be optimised separately.

In 1975, Thompson, Kirkby and Whiteaway analysed optical scattering in double-heterostructure and five-layer lasers, examining imperfections at heterostructure interfaces as a possible source of excess optical loss.

Experimental work published in 1976 by Thompson, Henshall, Whiteaway and Kirkby described five-layer lasers that used inner heterojunctions for carrier confinement and outer heterojunctions for optical confinement.

Thompson's later work included research into the temperature sensitivity of long-wavelength semiconductor lasers.

In 1989, he co-authored an assessment of quarter-wave phase-shifted distributed-feedback laser structures.

A 1994 invited paper co-authored by Thompson described a multimode, large-signal model of distributed-feedback lasers. The model incorporated spatial hole burning, carrier transport, nonlinear gain and device parasitics, and its predictions were compared with experimental measurements.

== Book and patents ==
Physics of Semiconductor Laser Devices covered semiconductor materials, crystal growth and fabrication, heterostructures, optical waveguides, stripe lasers, dynamic behaviour and distributed-feedback structures.

Thompson was named as inventor on patent families concerning injection lasers, diffraction gratings and wavelength-selective optical devices. A British patent filed in 1970 described a heterostructure injection laser in which a non-planar junction restricted current injection to a limited region.

Later inventions included a diffraction grating with a 1988 priority date, and an optical multiplexer/demultiplexer employing tandem gratings for wavelength-division multiplexing, with a 1998 priority date.

== Recognition ==
In 1992, Thompson received the J. J. Thomson Medal for Electronics from the Institution of Engineering and Technology. The official recipient list records that it was awarded for his extensive work on semiconductor lasers and optical devices.
