= Standard Telecommunication Laboratories =

UK research centre

Standard Telecommunication Laboratories was the UK research centre for Standard Telephones and Cables (STC). Initially based in Enfield, North London, and moved to Harlow Essex in 1959. STC was a subsidiary of ITT.

== Notable Achievements ==
It is now recognised as the birthplace of optical fibre communications, for it is here that Sir Charles K. Kao, George Hockham and others pioneered the use of single-mode optical fibre made from low loss glass.

The laboratory also carried out significant research into semiconductor lasers. In 1972, Nature described work by STL physicist G. H. B. Thompson on gallium arsenide double-heterostructure lasers as a "notable advance", reporting a carrier-confinement region of 0.18 μm and a threshold current density of 820 A cm^{−2}.

In 2009 Charles Kao was awarded the 2009 Nobel Prize in Physics for pioneering optical fibre communication. During the 1980s the Laboratory also developed prototype e-Ink displays.

Another famous name associated with STL is Alec Reeves, previously famous for inventing pulse-code modulation while working at the Paris labs of the parent company ITT in 1938, and for his invention of the wartime bomber navigation system OBOE. Alec headed a team working on various means of optical communication, prior to the emergence of glass optical fibre as the leading contender.

== Ownership ==
In 1991, the laboratories became a part of Bell Northern Research (BNR), following the acquisition of STC by Northern Telecom, which later became Nortel.

Nortel subsequently encountered financial difficulties, and was broken up and sold off. The last remnants of the laboratories at the Harlow, Essex site, have now disappeared.

== Redevelopment Of Laboratories Site ==
Since the collapse of Nortel, the site has been redeveloped into a new high-technology business development called KAOPARK.
