= Gallium(II) sulfide =

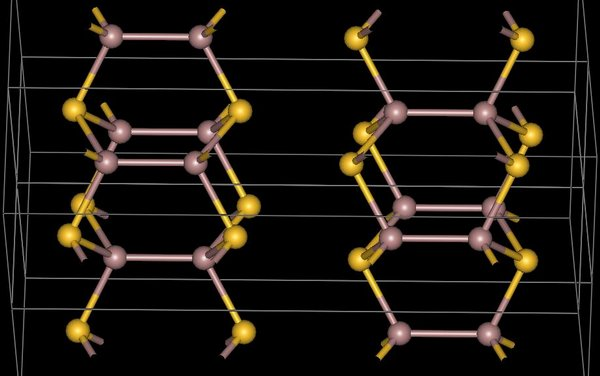
- Ball and stick, cell model of gallium(II) sulfide

Names
- Other names Gallium sulfide

Identifiers
CAS Number	12024-10-1
3D model (JSmol)	Interactive image
ChemSpider	4898760
ECHA InfoCard	100.031.522
PubChem CID	6370242
CompTox Dashboard (EPA)	DTXSID101319005
- InChI: InChI=1S/Ga.S Key: HLVRMBHKGAMNOI-UHFFFAOYSA-N
- SMILES: [Ga+2][Ga+2].[S-2].[S-2]

Properties
Chemical formula	GaS^{•}
Molar mass	101.788 g mol^{−1}
Appearance	Yellow crystals
Density	3.86 g cm^{−3}
Melting point	965 °C (1,769 °F; 1,238 K)
Magnetic susceptibility (χ)	−23.0·10^{−6} cm^{3}/mol

Structure
Crystal structure	hexagonal, hP8
Space group	P6_{3}/mmc, No. 194

Related compounds
Related compounds	Gallium(III) sulfide
- Except where otherwise noted, data are given for materials in their standard state (at 25 °C [77 °F], 100 kPa). verify (what is ?) Infobox references

Gallium(II) sulfide, GaS, is a chemical compound of gallium and sulfur. The normal form of gallium(II) sulfide as made from the elements has a hexagonal layer structure containing Ga_{2}^{4+} units which have a Ga-Ga distance of 248pm. This layer structure is similar to GaTe, GaSe and InSe. An unusual metastable form, with a distorted wurtzite structure has been reported as being produced using MOCVD. The metal organic precursors were di-tert-butyl gallium dithiocarbamates, for example Ga^{t}Bu_{2}(S_{2}CNMe_{2}) and this was deposited onto GaAs. The structure of the GaS produced in this way is presumably Ga^{2+} S^{2−}.

Single layers of gallium sulfide are dynamically stable two-dimensional semiconductors, in which the valence band has an inverted Mexican-hat shape, leading to a Lifshitz transition as the hole-doping is increased.

Gallium(II) sulfide demonstrates nonlinear optical activities, including second-harmonic generation and two-photon excited fluorescence.
