= Indium(II) selenide =

Identifiers
CAS Number	1312-42-1
3D model (JSmol)	Interactive image
ChemSpider	4906850
PubChem CID	101946410
- InChI: InChI=1S/In.Se Key: NMHFBDQVKIZULJ-UHFFFAOYSA-N
- SMILES: [Se].[In]

Properties
Chemical formula	InSe
Molar mass	193.789 g·mol^{−1}
Density	5.0
Melting point	611 °C (1,132 °F; 884 K)
- Except where otherwise noted, data are given for materials in their standard state (at 25 °C [77 °F], 100 kPa). Infobox references

Indium(II) selenide (InSe) is an inorganic compound composed of indium and selenium. It is a III-VI layered semiconductor. The solid has a structure consisting of two-dimensional layers bonded together only by van der Waals forces. Each layer has the atoms in the order Se-In-In-Se.

Potential applications are for field effect transistors, optoelectronics, photovoltaic, non-linear optics, strain gauges, and methanol gas sensors.

== Formation ==
Indium(II) selenide can be formed via a number of different methods. A method to make the bulk solid is the Bridgman/Stockbarger method, in which the elements indium and selenium are heated to over 900 °C in a sealed capsule, and then slowly cooled over about a month. Another method is electrodeposition from a water solution of indium(I) sulfate and selenium dioxide.

== Properties ==
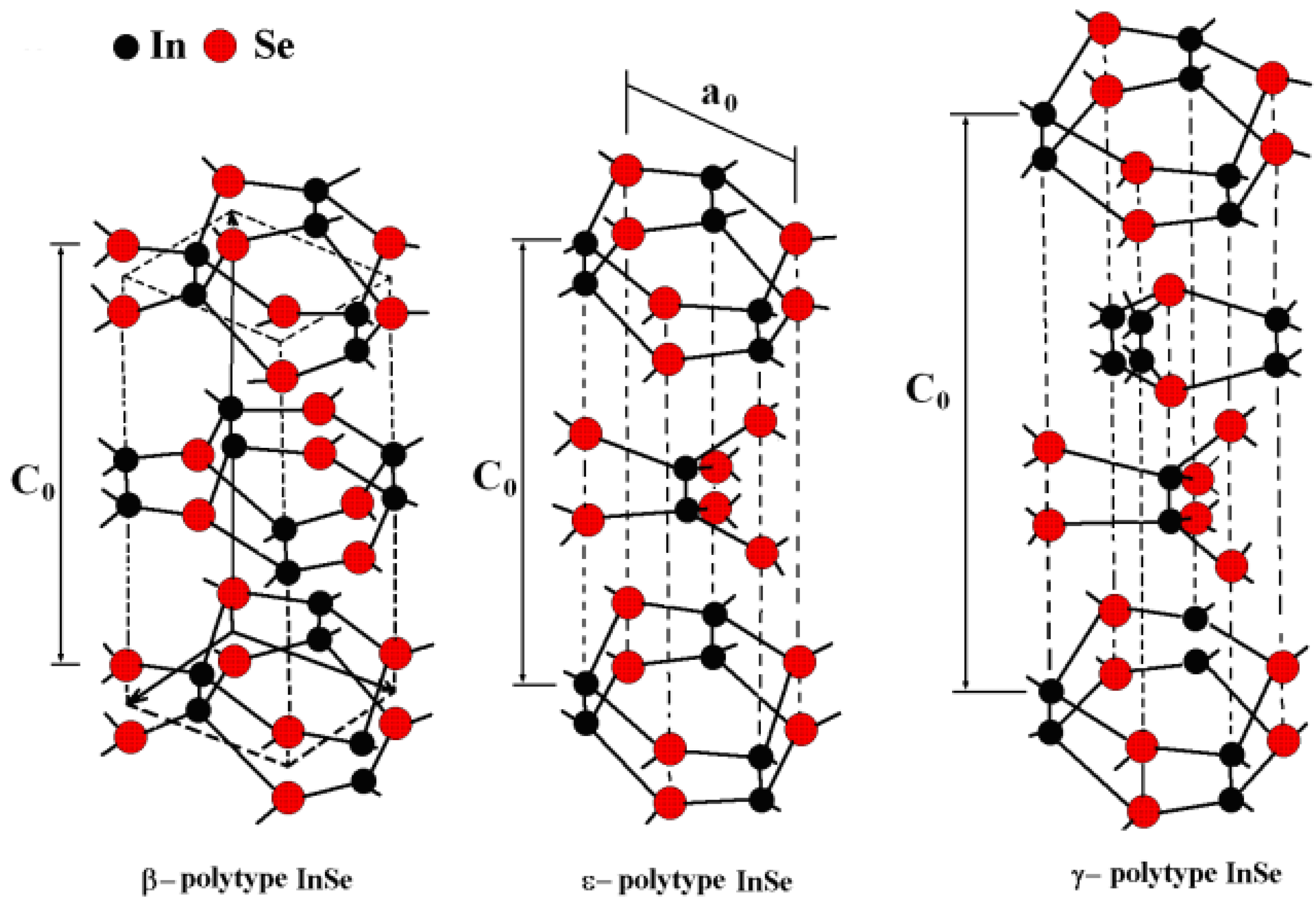
Diagram of polytopes of indium(II) selenide

There are three polytopes or crystal forms. β, ε are hexagonal with unit cells spanning two layers. γ has rhombohedral crystal system, with the unit cell including four layers.

β-Indium(II) selenide can be exfoliated into two-dimensional sheets using sticky tape. In a vacuum these form smooth layers. However, when exposed to air, the layers become corrugated because of chemisorption of air molecules. Exfoliation can also take place in isopropanol liquid.

Indium (II) selenide is stable in ambient conditions of oxygen and water vapour, unlike many other semiconductors.

polytope	space group	unit cell	band gap	eV
β	P6_{3}/mmc	a=4.005 c=16.660 Z=4	direct	1.28
γ	R3m	a=7.1286 Å, c=19.382 Å and Z=6	direct	1.29
ε	P6̅m2		indirect	1.4

== Doping ==
The properties of indium(II) selenide can be varied by way of altering the exact ratio of elements from 1:1, creating vacancies. It is hard to get an exact equality. The properties can be compensated by transition element doping. Other elements that can be included in small concentrations are boron, silver, and cadmium.
