= Indium(III) telluride =

Names
- Other names indium tritelluride

Identifiers
CAS Number	1312-45-4
3D model (JSmol)	Interactive image
ChemSpider	21170822
ECHA InfoCard	100.013.814
EC Number	215-194-4
PubChem CID	6383318
UNII	GED20Z9NEI
- InChI: InChI=1S/2In.3Te Key: TWZRXWXUSGBTAD-UHFFFAOYSA-N
- SMILES: [Te]=[In][Te][In]=[Te]

Properties
Chemical formula	In_{2}Te_{3}
Molar mass	612.44 g/mol
Appearance	blue cubic crystals
Density	5.75 g/cm^{3}, solid
Melting point	667 °C (1,233 °F; 940 K)
- Except where otherwise noted, data are given for materials in their standard state (at 25 °C [77 °F], 100 kPa). verify (what is ?) Infobox references

Indium(III) telluride (In_{2}Te_{3}) is an inorganic compound. A black solid, it is sometimes described as an intermetallic compound, because it has properties that are metal-like and salt like. It is a semiconductor that has attracted occasional interest for its thermoelectric and photovoltaic applications, similar to Silicon. No applications have been implemented commercially however.

== Preparation and reactions ==
A conventional route entails heating the elements in a seal-tube:

3Te + 2 In → In_{2}Te_{3}

Indium(III) telluride reacts with strong acids to produce hydrogen telluride.
