= Gallium(III) sulfide =

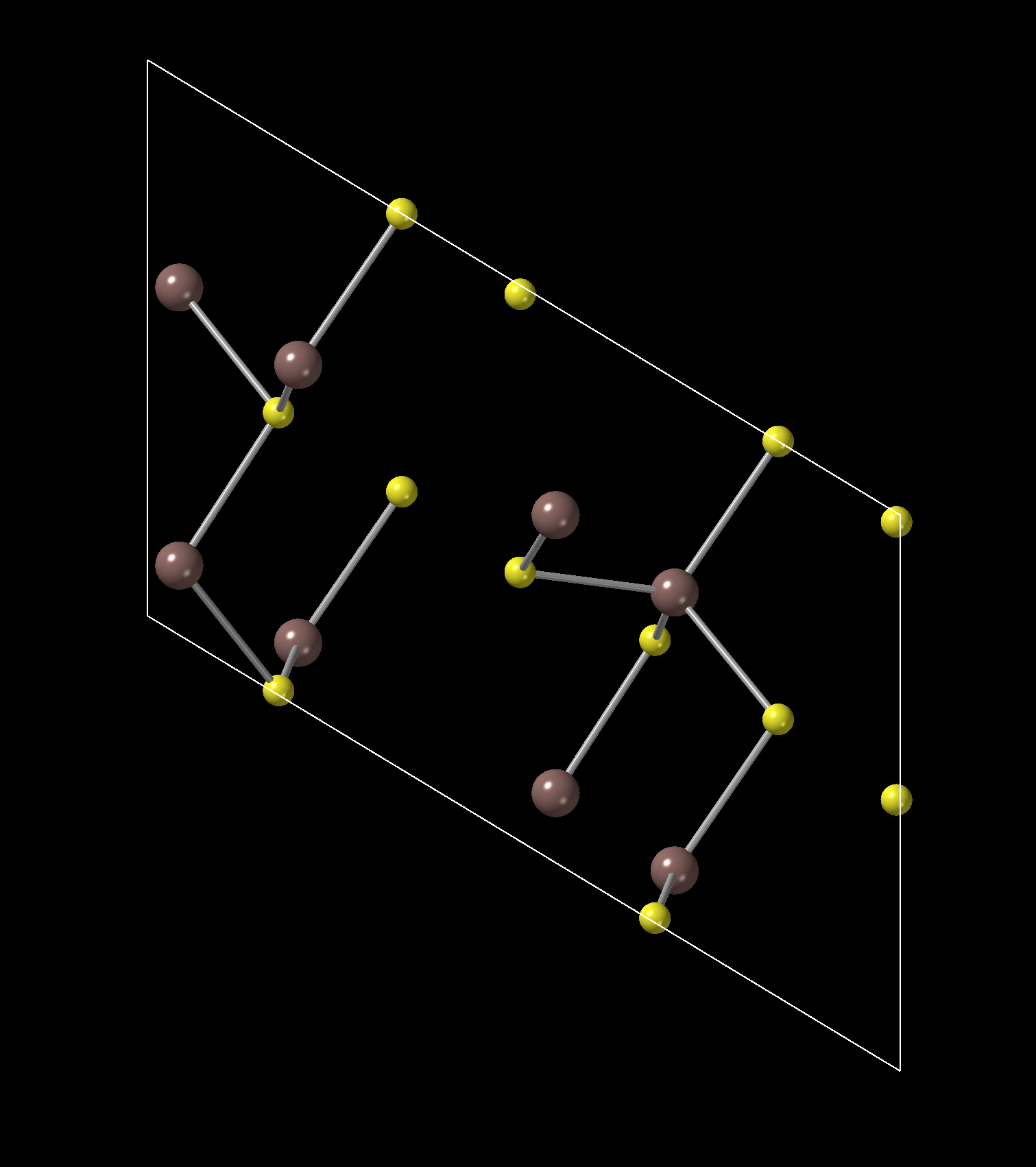

Names
- Other names gallium sesquisulfide

Identifiers
CAS Number	12024-22-5
3D model (JSmol)	Interactive image
ChemSpider	145436
ECHA InfoCard	100.031.526
EC Number	234-688-0
PubChem CID	165983
CompTox Dashboard (EPA)	DTXSID70904021
- InChI: InChI=1S/2Ga.3S/q2*+3;3*-2 Key: BVSHTEBQPBBCFT-UHFFFAOYSA-N
- SMILES: [S-2].[S-2].[S-2].[Ga+3].[Ga+3]

Properties
Chemical formula	Ga_{2}S_{3}
Molar mass	235.644 g/mol
Appearance	yellow (α-)
Density	3.77 g/cm^{3}
Melting point	1,090 °C (1,990 °F; 1,360 K)
Solubility in water	Reacts
Magnetic susceptibility (χ)	−80·10^{−6} cm^{3}/mol

Related compounds
Related compounds	Gallium(II) sulfide
- Except where otherwise noted, data are given for materials in their standard state (at 25 °C [77 °F], 100 kPa). Infobox references

Gallium(III) sulfide, Ga_{2}S_{3}, is a compound of sulfur and gallium, that is a semiconductor that has applications in electronics and photonics.

== Structure ==
There are four polymorphs, α (hexagonal), α' (monoclinic), β(hexagonal) and γ(cubic). The alpha form is yellow. The crystal structures are related to those of ZnS with gallium in tetrahedral positions. The alpha and beta forms are isostructural with their aluminium analogues. The similarity in crystal form of gamma- with sphalerite (zinc blende), ZnS is believed to explain the enrichment of gallium in sphalerite ores.

== Preparation and chemical properties ==
Ga_{2}S_{3} can prepared by reacting the elements at high temperature or as a white solid by heating Ga in a stream of H_{2}S at high temperature (950 °C).

It may also prepared by a solid state reaction of GaCl_{3} and Na_{2}S.

The method of production can determine the polymorphic form produced, the reaction of Ga(OH)_{3} with H_{2}S at different temperatures is reported to produce a different polymorph depending on the temperature, α- 1020 K, β- 820 K and γ- above 873 K

Ga_{2}S_{3} decomposes at high temperature forming the non-stoichiometric sulfide, Ga_{4}S_{x} (4.8 < x < 5.2). Ga_{2}S_{3} dissolves in aqueous acids and decomposes slowly in moist air forming H_{2}S.

Ga_{2}S_{3} dissolves in aqueous solutions of potassium sulfide, K_{2}S to form K_{8}Ga_{4}S_{10} containing the (Ga_{4}S_{10})^{8−} anion which has an adamantane, molecular P_{4}O_{10} structure.

Ternary sulfides M^{I}GaS_{2}, M^{II}Ga_{2}S_{4} and M^{III}GaS_{3} respectively have been of interest due to their unusual electrical properties and some of these can be prepared by reactions of Ga_{2}S_{3} with metal sulfides e.g. CdGa_{2}S_{4}:-

Ga_{2}S_{3} + CdS → CdGa_{2}S_{4}

Although by itself Ga_{2}S_{3} is not a glass former it can be reacted with rare earth sulfides to form glasses e.g. the reaction with lanthanum sulfide, La_{2}S_{3}, forms gallium lanthanum sulfide glass which has interesting optical properties and is a semiconductor.
