= Light-emitting diode =

Semiconductor light source

Light-emitting diode (LED)
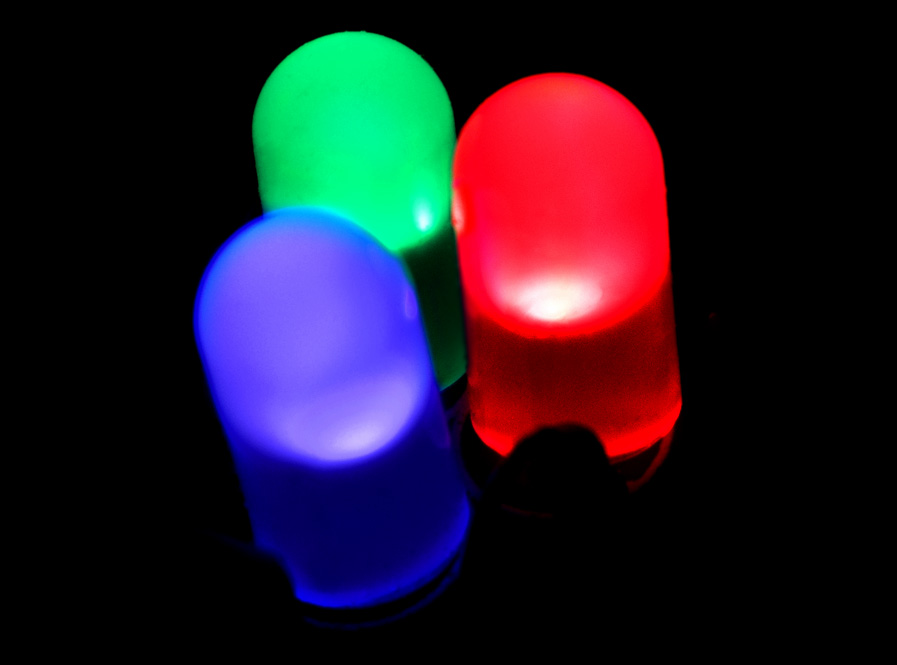
- Blue, green, and red LEDs in 5 mm diffused cases. There are many different variants of LEDs.
- Component type: Active electronic component
- Working principle: Electroluminescence
- Inventor: H. J. Round (1907); Oleg Losev (1927); James R. Biard (1961); Nick Holonyak (1962)
- First produced: October 1962; 64 years ago
- Pin names: Anode and cathode

Electronic symbol

Parts of a conventional LED. The flat bottom surfaces of the anvil and post embedded inside the epoxy act as anchors to prevent the conductors from being forcefully pulled out via mechanical strain or vibration.

Close-up of an LED with the voltage being increased and decreased to show a detailed view of its operation

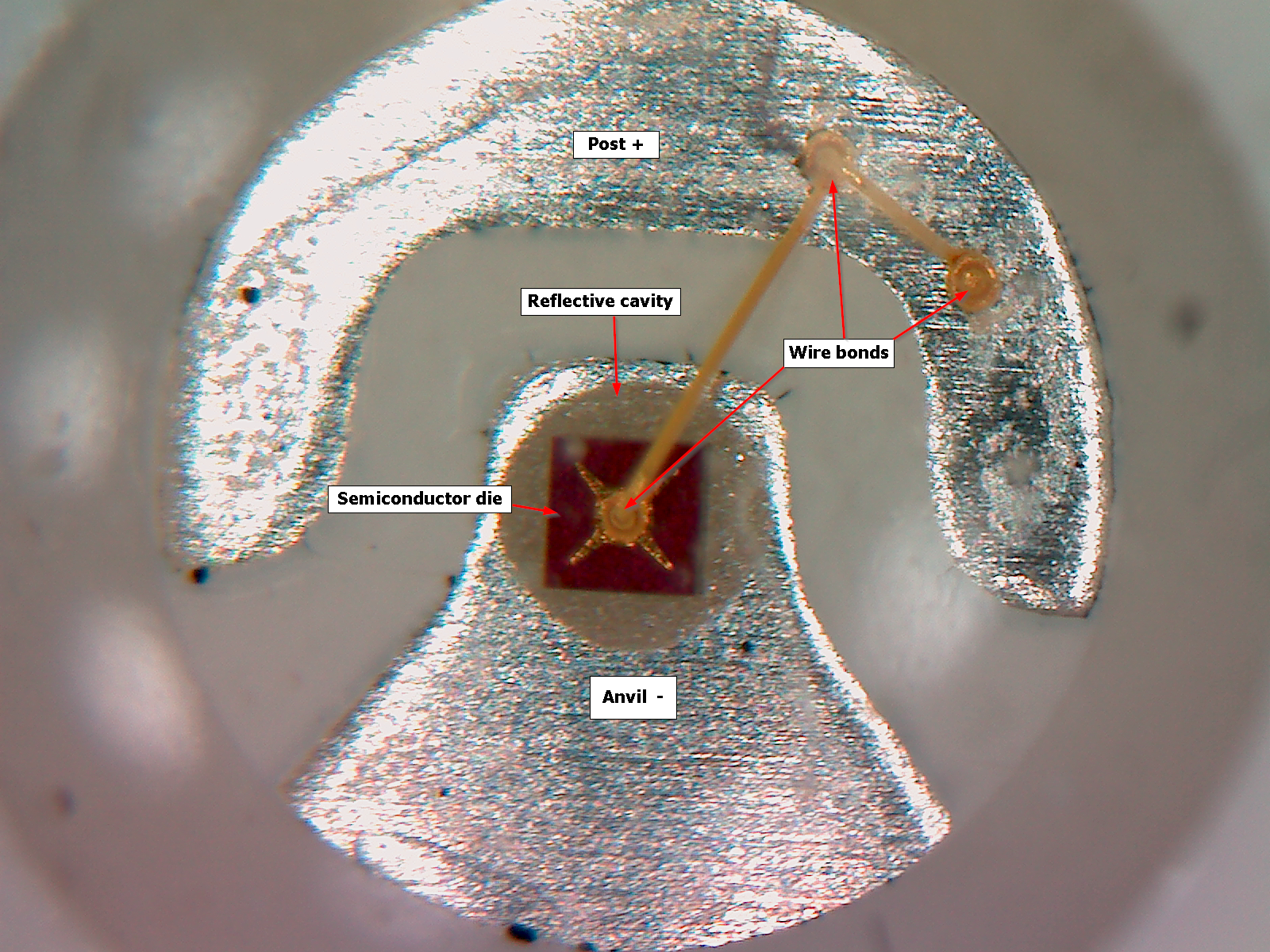
Close-up image of a surface-mount LED

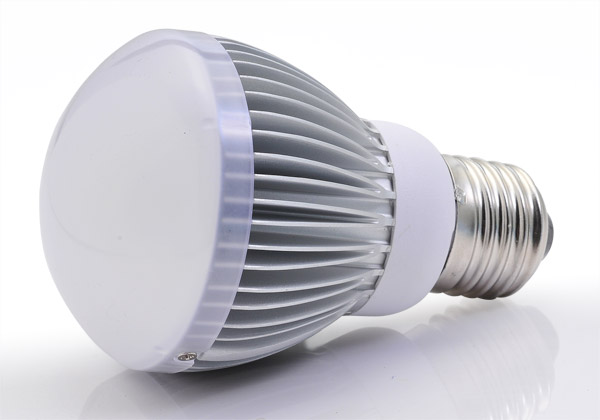
A bulb-shaped retrofit LED lamp with aluminum heat sink, a light diffusing dome and E27 screw base, using a built-in power supply working on mains voltage

A light-emitting diode (LED) is an electronic component that uses a semiconductor to emit light when current flows through it. Electrons in the semiconductor recombine with electron holes, thereby releasing energy in the form of photons. The color of the light (corresponding to the energy of the photons) is determined by the energy required for electrons to cross the band gap of the semiconductor. White light is obtained by using multiple semiconductors or a layer of light-emitting phosphor on the semiconductor device.

Appearing as practical electronic components in 1962, the earliest LEDs emitted low-intensity infrared (IR) light. Infrared LEDs are used in remote-control circuits, such as those used with a wide variety of consumer electronics. The first visible-light LEDs were of low intensity and limited to red.

Early LEDs were often used as indicator lamps, replacing small incandescent bulbs, and in seven-segment displays. Later developments produced LEDs available in visible, ultraviolet (UV), and infrared wavelengths with high, low, or intermediate light output, such as white LEDs suitable for room and outdoor lighting. LEDs have also given rise to new types of displays and sensors, while their high switching rates have uses in advanced communications technology. LEDs have been used in diverse applications such as aviation lighting, fairy lights, strip lights, automotive headlamps, advertising, stage lighting, general lighting, traffic signals, camera flashes, lighted wallpaper, horticultural grow lights, and medical devices.

LEDs have many advantages over incandescent light sources, including lower power consumption, reduced waste heat, a longer lifetime, improved physical robustness, smaller sizes, and faster switching. In exchange for these generally favorable attributes, disadvantages of LEDs include electrical limitations to low voltage and generally to DC (not AC) power, the inability to provide steady illumination from a pulsing DC or an AC electrical supply source, and a lower maximum operating and storage temperatures.

LEDs are transducers of electricity into light.

== History ==
Electroluminescence from a solid-state diode was discovered in 1906 by Henry Joseph Round of Marconi Labs, and was published in February 1907 in Electrical World. Round observed that various carborundum (silicon carbide) crystals would emit yellow, light green, orange, or blue light when a voltage was passed between the poles.

A silicon carbide LED was created by Soviet inventor Oleg Losev in 1927.

Commercially viable LEDs only became available after Texas Instruments engineers patented efficient near-infrared emission from a diode based on gallium arsenides (GaAs) in 1962. Commercial LEDs were extremely costly and saw no practical use until Monsanto and Hewlett-Packard developed them to the point where a unit cost less than five cents in the 1970s.

In the early 1990s, Shuji Nakamura, Hiroshi Amano and Isamu Akasaki developed blue light-emitting diodes, bringing white lighting and full-color LED displays into practical use. For this work, they won the 2014 Nobel Prize in Physics.

== Physics of light production and emission ==
In a light-emitting diode, the recombination of electrons and electron holes in a semiconductor produces light (infrared, visible or UV), a process called electroluminescence. The wavelength of the light depends on the energy band gap of the semiconductors used. Since these materials have a high index of refraction, design features of the devices, such as special optical coatings and die shape, are required to efficiently emit light.

Unlike a laser, the light emitted from an LED is neither spectrally nor spatially coherent nor even highly monochromatic. Its spectrum is sufficiently narrow that it appears to the human eye as a pure (saturated) color. Also, it cannot approach the very high intensity characteristic of lasers.

== Single-color LEDs ==
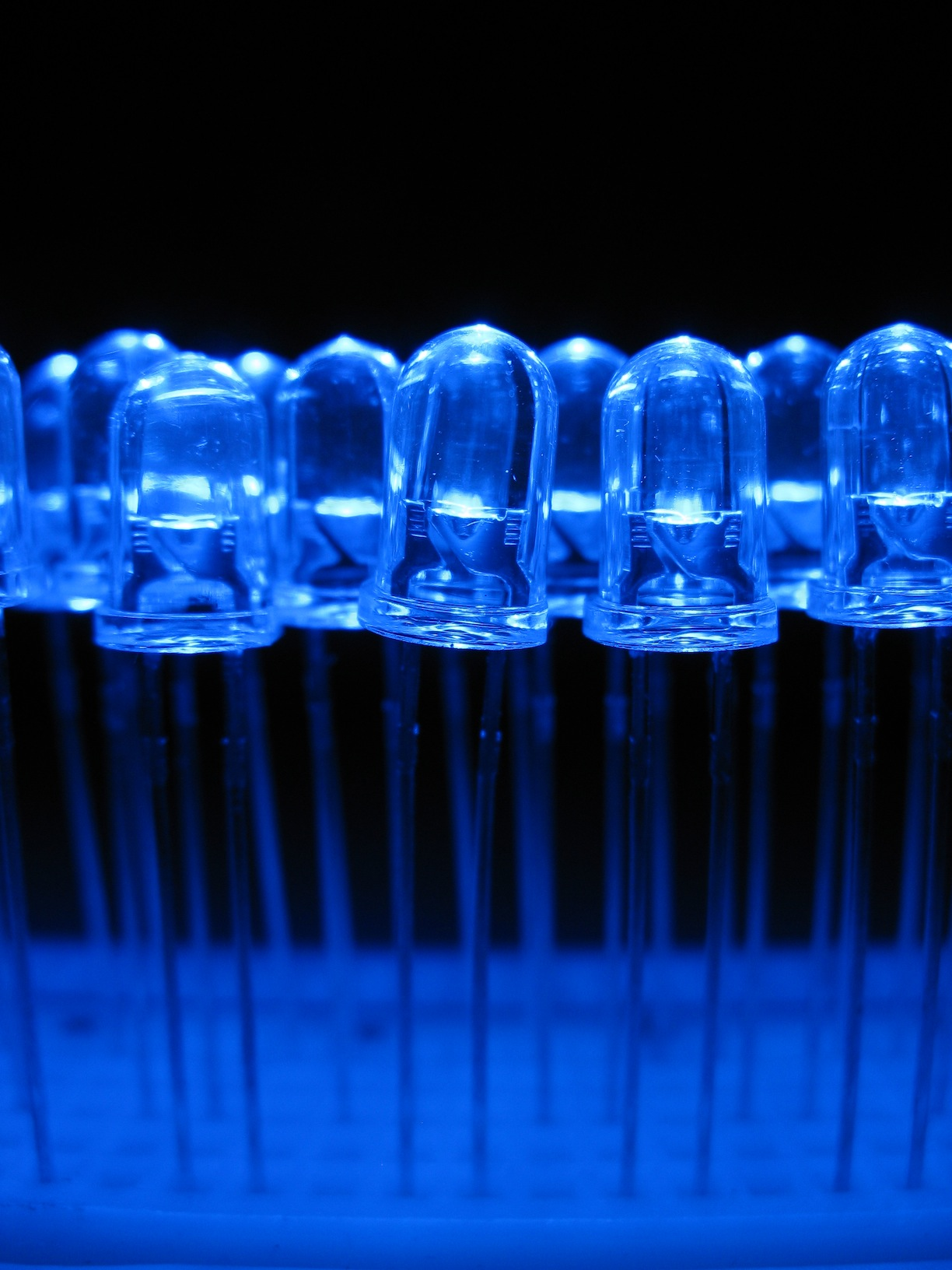
Blue LEDs

External videos
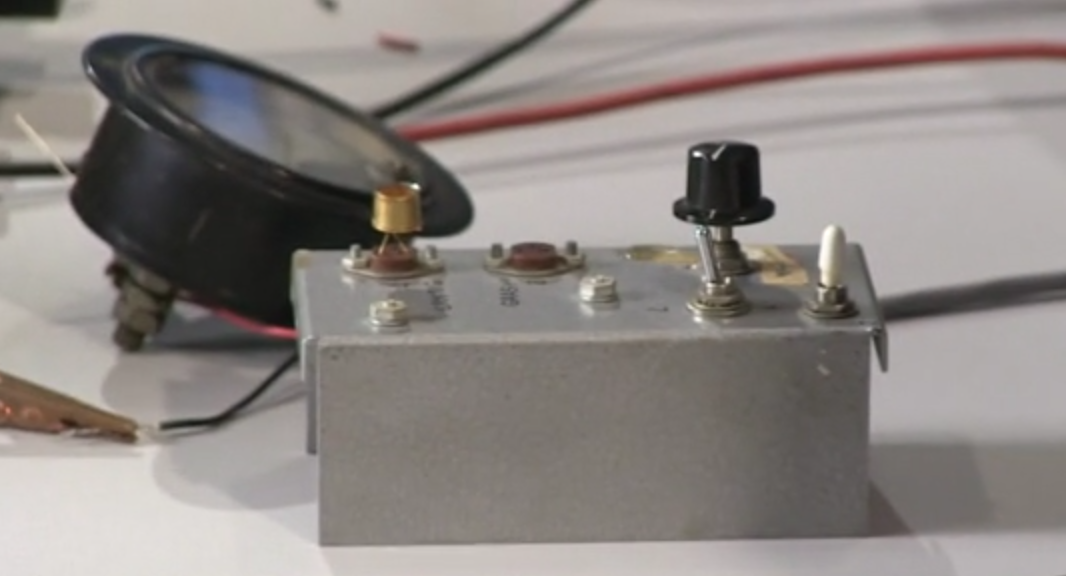
- "The Original Blue LED", Science History Institute

By selection of different semiconductor materials, single-color LEDs can be made that emit light in a narrow band of wavelengths, from the near-infrared through the visible spectrum and into the ultraviolet range. The required operating voltages of LEDs increase as the emitted wavelengths become shorter (higher energy, red to blue), because of their increasing semiconductor band gap.

Blue LEDs have an active region consisting of one or more InGaN quantum wells sandwiched between thicker layers of GaN, called cladding layers. By varying the relative In/Ga fraction in the InGaN quantum wells, the light emission can in theory be varied from violet to amber.

Aluminium gallium nitride (AlGaN) of varying Al/Ga fraction can be used to manufacture the cladding and quantum well layers for ultraviolet LEDs, but these devices have not yet reached the level of efficiency and technological maturity of InGaN/GaN blue/green devices. If unalloyed GaN is used in this case to form the active quantum well layers, the device emits near-ultraviolet light with a peak wavelength centered around 365 nm. Green LEDs manufactured from the InGaN/GaN system are far more efficient and brighter than green LEDs produced with non-nitride material systems, but practical devices still exhibit efficiency too low for high-brightness applications.

With AlGaN and AlGaInN, even shorter wavelengths are achievable. Near-UV emitters at wavelengths around 360–395 nm are already cheap and often encountered, for example, as black light lamp replacements for inspection of anti-counterfeiting UV watermarks in documents and bank notes, and for UV curing. Substantially more expensive, shorter-wavelength diodes are commercially available for wavelengths down to 240 nm. As the photosensitivity of microorganisms approximately matches the absorption spectrum of DNA, with a peak at about 260 nm, UV LED emitting at 250–270 nm are expected in prospective disinfection and sterilization devices. Recent research has shown that commercially available UVA LEDs (365 nm) are already effective for disinfection and sterilization. UV-C wavelengths were obtained in laboratories using aluminium nitride (210 nm), boron nitride (215 nm) and diamond (235 nm).

== White LEDs ==
There are two primary ways of producing white light-emitting diodes (WLED). One is to use individual LEDs that emit three primary colors—red, green and blue—and then mix all the colors to form white light. The other, more common method is to use a phosphor material to convert monochromatic light from a blue or UV LED to broad-spectrum white light, similar to a fluorescent lamp. The yellow phosphor is made of cerium-doped yttrium aluminium garnet (YAG) crystals suspended in the package or coated on the LED. This YAG phosphor causes white LEDs to appear yellow when off, and the spaces between the crystals allow some blue light to pass through in LEDs with partial phosphor conversion. Alternatively, white LEDs may use other phosphors like manganese(IV)-doped potassium fluorosilicate (PFS). PFS assists in red light generation and is used in conjunction with a conventional Ce:YAG phosphor.

In LEDs with PFS phosphor, some blue light passes through the phosphors; the Ce:YAG phosphor converts blue light to green and red (yellow) light, and the PFS phosphor converts blue light to red light. The color emission spectrum or color temperature of white phosphor-converted and other phosphor-converted LEDs can be controlled by changing the concentration of several phosphors that form a phosphor blend used in an LED package.

The 'whiteness' of the light produced is engineered to suit the human eye. Because of metamerism, it is possible to have quite different spectra that appear white. The appearance of objects illuminated by that light may vary as the spectrum varies. This is the issue of color rendition, quite separate from color temperature. An orange or cyan object could appear with the wrong color and much darker as the LED or phosphor does not emit the wavelength it reflects. The best color rendition LEDs use a mix of phosphors, resulting in less efficiency and better color rendering.

The first white light-emitting diodes (LEDs) were offered for sale in the autumn of 1996. Nichia made some of the first white LEDs which were based on blue LEDs with Ce:YAG phosphor. Ce:YAG is often grown using the Czochralski method.

=== RGB systems ===
Combined spectral curves for blue, yellow-green, and high-brightness red solid-state semiconductor LEDs. FWHM spectral bandwidth is approximately 24–27 nm for all three colors.

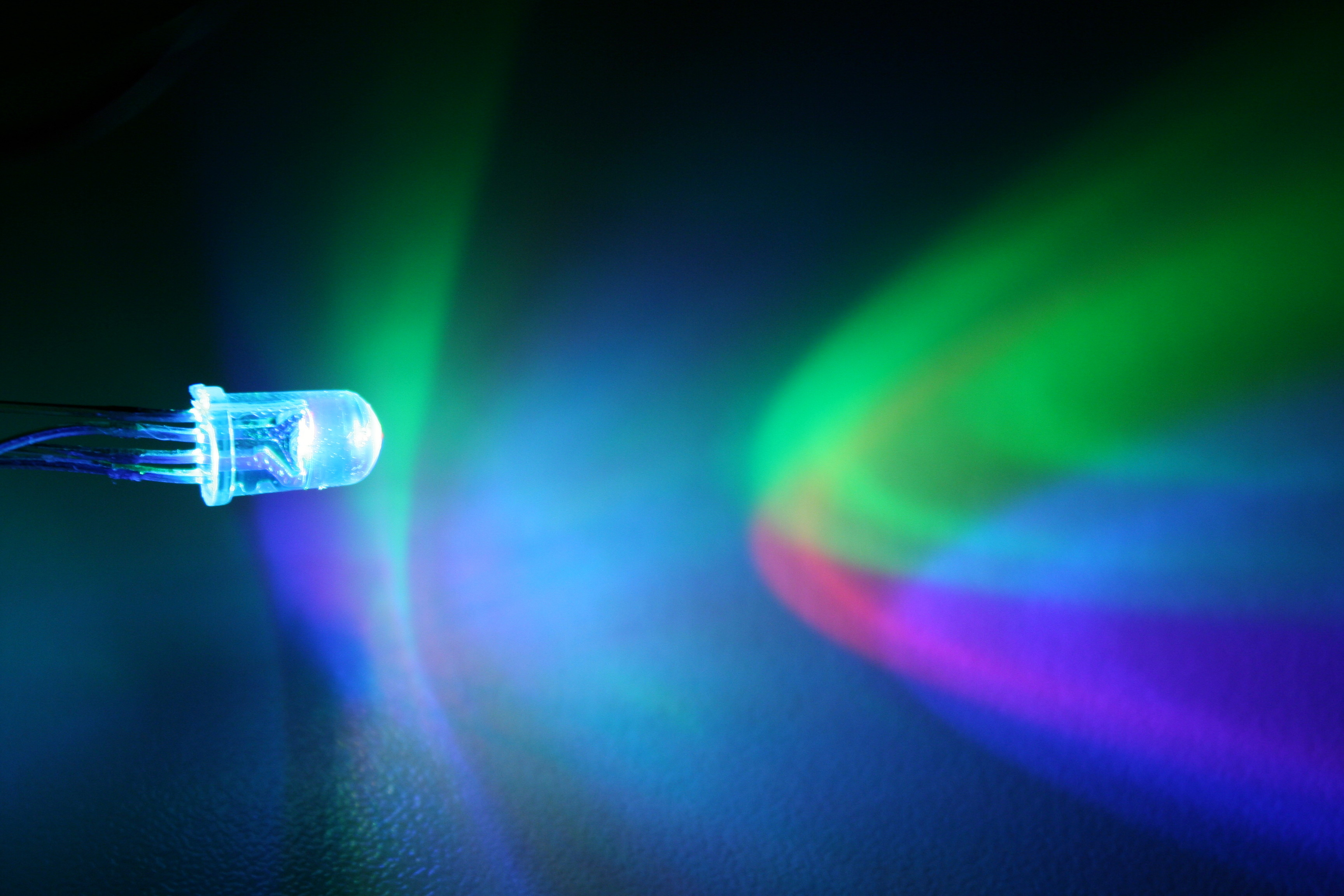
An RGB LED projecting red, green, and blue onto a surface

Mixing red, green, and blue sources to produce white light needs electronic circuits to control the blending of the colors. Since LEDs have slightly different emission patterns, the color balance may change depending on the angle of view, even if the RGB sources are in a single package, so RGB diodes are seldom used to produce white lighting. Nonetheless, this method has many applications because of the flexibility of mixing different colors, and in principle, this mechanism also has higher quantum efficiency in producing white light.

There are several types of multicolor white LEDs: di-, tri-, and tetrachromatic white LEDs. Several key factors that play a role among these different methods include color stability, color rendering capability, and luminous efficacy. Often, higher efficiency means lower color rendering, presenting a trade-off between luminous efficacy and color rendering. For example, the dichromatic white LEDs have the best luminous efficacy (120 lm/W), but the lowest color rendering capability. Although tetrachromatic white LEDs have excellent color rendering capability, they often have poor luminous efficacy. Trichromatic white LEDs are in between, having both good luminous efficacy (>70 lm/W) and fair color rendering capability.

One of the challenges is the development of more efficient green LEDs. The theoretical maximum for green LEDs is 683 lumens per watt, but as of 2010 few green LEDs exceed even 100 lumens per watt. The blue and red LEDs approach their theoretical limits.

Multicolor LEDs offer a means to form light of different colors. Most perceivable colors can be formed by mixing different amounts of three primary colors. This allows precise dynamic color control. Their emission power decays exponentially with rising temperature, resulting in a substantial change in color stability. Such problems hinder industrial use. Multicolor LEDs without phosphors cannot provide good color rendering because each LED is a narrowband source. LEDs without phosphors, while a poorer solution for general lighting, are the best solution for displays, whether they are LCD-backlit or direct LED-based pixels.

Dimming a multicolor LED source to match the characteristics of incandescent lamps is difficult because manufacturing variations, age, and temperature change the actual color value output. To emulate the appearance of dimming in incandescent lamps, LEDs may require a feedback system with a color sensor to actively monitor and control the color.

=== Phosphor-based LEDs ===
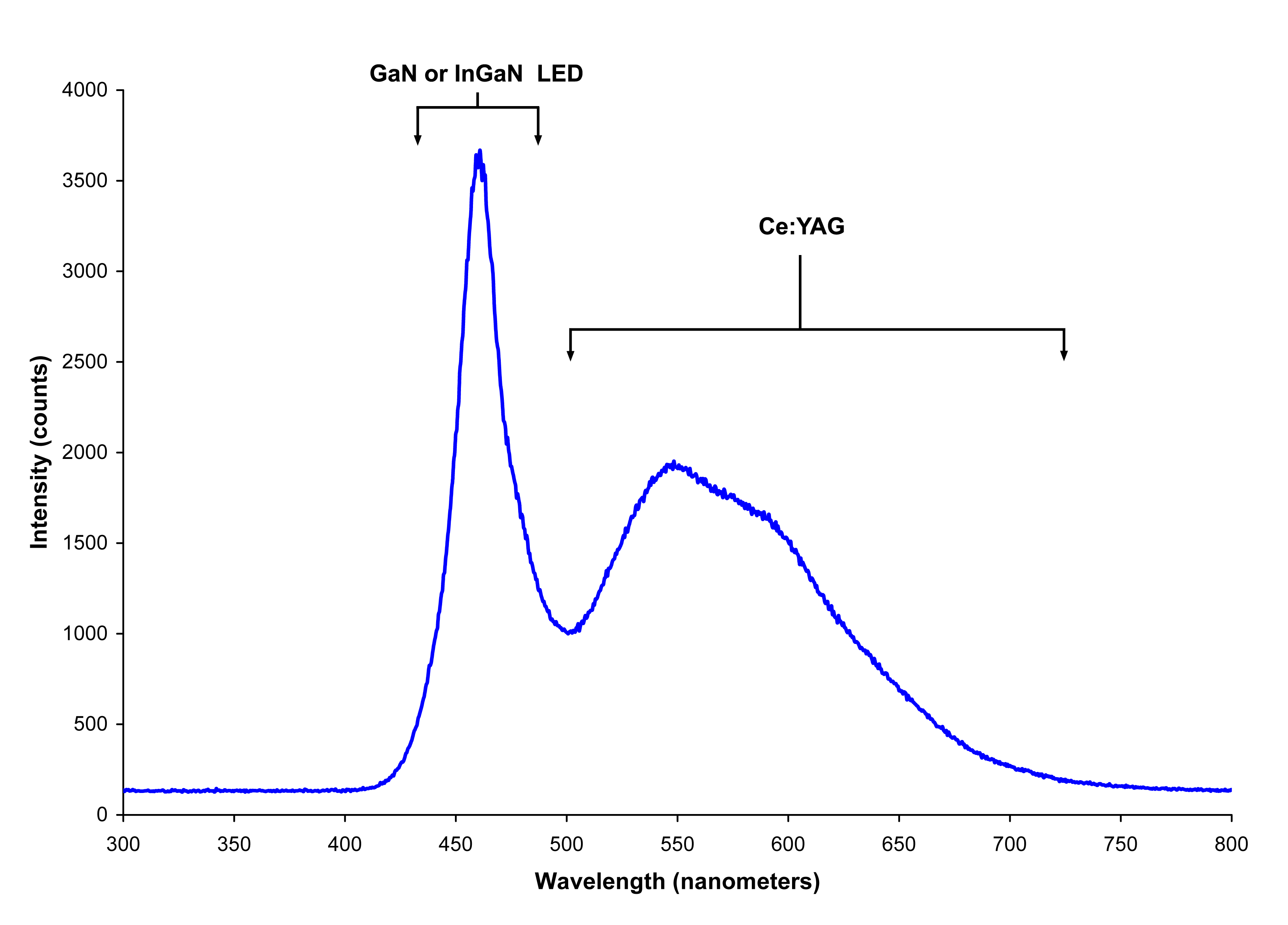
Spectrum of a white LED showing blue light directly emitted by the GaN-based LED (peak at about 465 nm) and the more broadband Stokes-shifted light emitted by the Ce^{3+}:YAG phosphor, which emits at roughly 500–700 nm

This method involves coating LEDs of one color (mostly blue LEDs made of InGaN) with phosphors of different colors to form white light; the resultant LEDs are called phosphor-based or phosphor-converted white LEDs (pcLEDs). A fraction of the blue light undergoes the Stokes shift, which transforms it from shorter wavelengths to longer. Depending on the original LED's color, various color phosphors are used. Using several phosphor layers of distinct colors broadens the emitted spectrum, effectively raising the color rendering index (CRI).

Phosphor-based LEDs have efficiency losses due to heat loss from the Stokes shift and other phosphor-related issues. Their luminous efficacies compared to normal LEDs depend on the spectral distribution of the resultant light output and the original wavelength of the LED itself. For example, the luminous efficacy of a typical YAG yellow phosphor-based white LED ranges from 3 to 5 times the luminous efficacy of the original blue LED because of the human eye's greater sensitivity to yellow than to blue (as modeled in the luminosity function).

Due to the simplicity of manufacturing, the phosphor method is still the most popular method for making high-intensity white LEDs. The design and production of a light source or light fixture using a monochrome emitter with phosphor conversion is simpler and cheaper than a complex RGB system, and the majority of high-intensity white LEDs presently on the market are manufactured using phosphor light conversion.

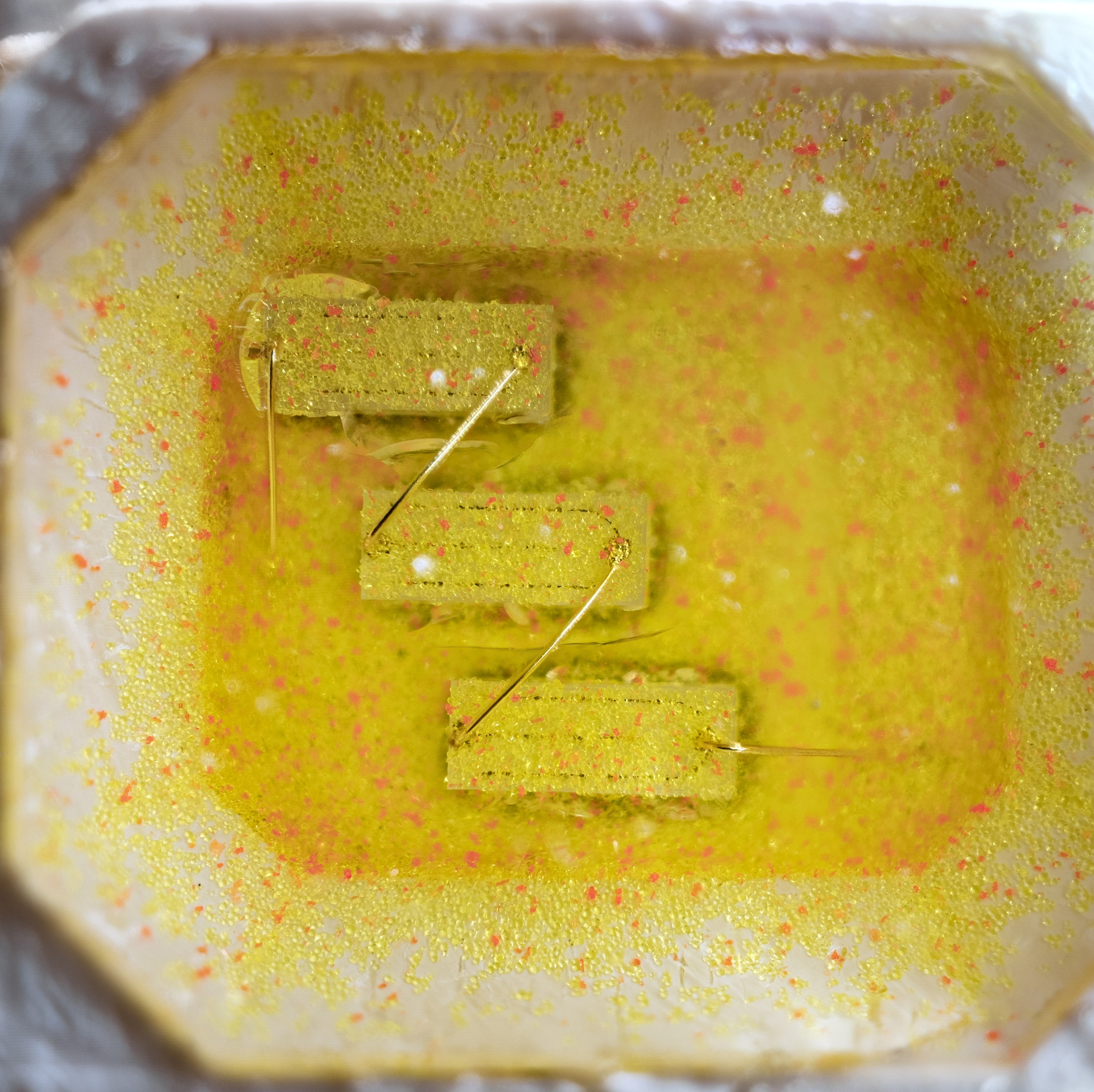
1 watt 9 volt three-chip SMD phosphor-based white LED

Among the challenges being faced to improve the efficiency of LED-based white light sources is the development of more efficient phosphors. As of 2010, the most efficient yellow phosphor is still the YAG phosphor, with less than 10% Stokes shift loss. Losses attributable to internal optical losses due to re-absorption in the LED chip and in the LED packaging itself typically account for another 10% to 30% loss. Currently, in the area of phosphor LED development, much effort is being spent on optimizing these devices for higher light output and higher operating temperatures. For instance, the efficiency can be raised by adapting better package design or by using a more suitable type of phosphor. A conformal coating process is frequently used to address the issue of varying phosphor thickness.

Some phosphor-based white LEDs encapsulate InGaN blue LEDs inside phosphor-coated epoxy. Alternatively, the LED might be paired with a remote phosphor, a preformed polycarbonate piece coated with the phosphor material. Remote phosphors provide more diffuse light, which is desirable for many applications. Remote phosphor designs are also more tolerant of variations in the LED emission spectrum. A common yellow phosphor material is cerium-doped yttrium aluminium garnet (Ce^{3+}:YAG).

White LEDs can also be made by coating near-ultraviolet (NUV) LEDs with a mixture of high-efficiency europium-based phosphors that emit red and blue, plus copper- and aluminium-doped zinc sulfide (ZnS:Cu, Al) that emits green. This is a method analogous to the way fluorescent lamps work. This method is less efficient than blue LEDs with YAG:Ce phosphor, as the Stokes shift is larger, but it yields light with better spectral characteristics, which render color better. Due to the higher radiative output of the ultraviolet LEDs than of the blue ones, both methods offer comparable brightness. A concern is that UV light may leak from a malfunctioning light source and cause harm to human eyes or skin.

A new style of wafers composed of gallium-nitride-on-silicon (GaN-on-Si) is being used to produce white LEDs using 200-mm silicon wafers. This avoids the typical costly sapphire substrate for relatively small 100- or 150-mm wafer sizes. The sapphire apparatus must be coupled with a mirror-like collector to reflect light that would otherwise be wasted. It was predicted that in 2020, 40% of all GaN LEDs are made with GaN-on-Si.

=== Mixed white LEDs ===
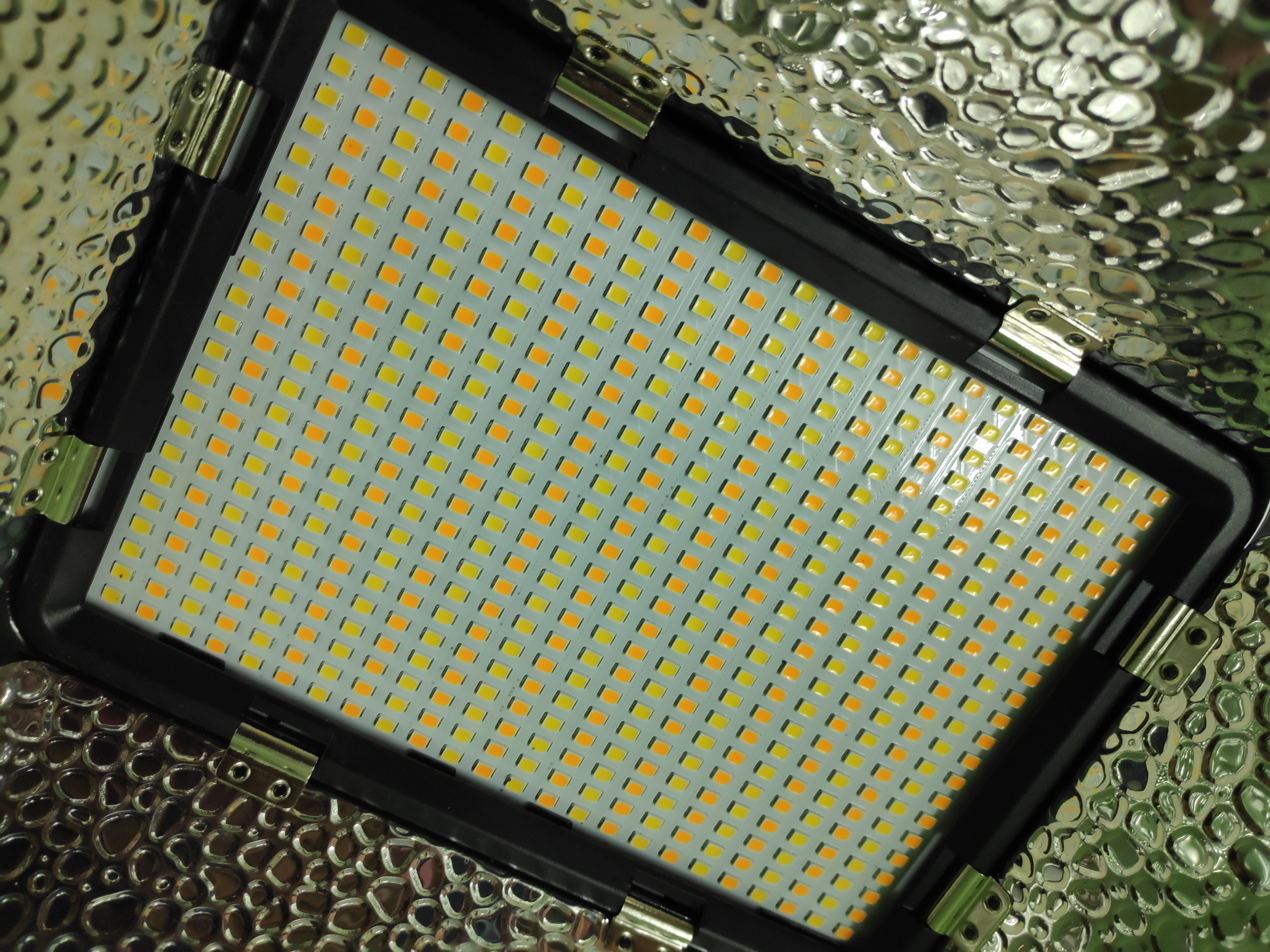
Tunable white LED array in a floodlight

There are RGBW LEDs that combine RGB units with a phosphor white LED on the market. Doing so retains the extremely tunable color of RGB LEDs, but allows color rendering and efficiency to be optimized when a color close to white is selected.

Some phosphor white LED units are "tunable white", blending two extremes of color temperatures (commonly 2700K and 6500K) to produce intermediate values. This feature allows users to change the lighting to suit the current use of a multifunction room. As illustrated by a straight line on the chromaticity diagram, simple two-white blends will have a pink bias, becoming most severe in the middle. A small amount of green light, provided by another LED, could correct the problem. Some products are RGBWW, i.e. RGBW with tunable white.

A final class of white LED with mixed light is dim-to-warm. These are ordinary 2700K white LED bulbs with a small red LED that turns on when the bulb is dimmed. Doing so makes the color warmer, emulating an incandescent light bulb.

=== Zinc selenide white LEDs ===
Experimental white LEDs have been developed using homoepitaxially grown zinc selenide (ZnSe) on ZnSe substrates. These LEDs lack the yellow phosphors found in conventional white LEDs. In ZnSe LEDs, the active region emits blue light, while the conductive ZnSe substrate emits yellow light, resulting in white light output. Researchers suggest these LEDs offer lower operating voltages and a wider range of color temperatures than conventional white LEDs.

== Organic light-emitting diodes (OLEDs) ==
In an organic light-emitting diode (OLED), the electroluminescent material composing the emissive layer of the diode is an organic compound. The organic material is electrically conductive due to the delocalization of pi electrons caused by conjugation over all or part of the molecule, and the material therefore functions as an organic semiconductor. The organic materials can be small organic molecules in a crystalline phase, or polymers.

The potential advantages of OLEDs include thin, low-cost displays with a low driving voltage, wide viewing angle, and high contrast and color gamut. Polymer LEDs have the added benefit of printable and flexible displays. OLEDs have been used to make visual displays for portable electronic devices such as cellphones, digital cameras, lighting and televisions.

== Types ==
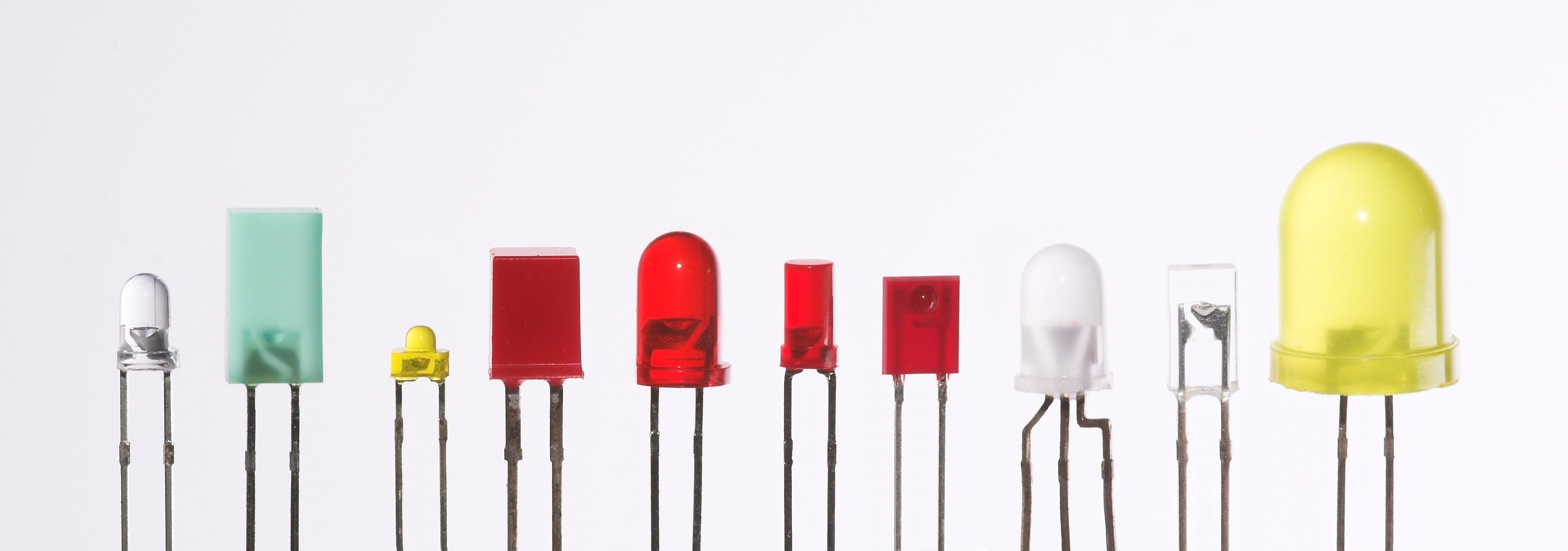
LEDs in a variety of shapes and sizes. The color of the plastic lens is often the same as the actual color of light emitted, but not always. For instance, purple plastic is often used for infrared LEDs, and most blue devices have colorless housings. Modern high-power LEDs such as those used for lighting and backlighting are generally found in surface-mount technology (SMT) packages (not shown).

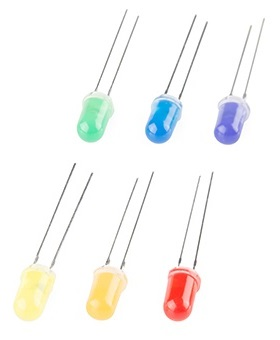
A variety of different diffused 5 mm through-hole LEDs: Red, 650–625 nm; Orange, 600–610 nm; Yellow, 587–591 nm; Green, 570–575 nm; Blue, 465–467 nm; Purple, 395–400 nm

LEDs are made in different packages for different applications. A single or a few LED junctions may be packed in one miniature device for use as an indicator or pilot lamp. An LED array may include controlling circuits within the same package, which may range from a simple resistor, blinking or color-changing control, or an addressable controller for RGB devices. Higher-powered white-emitting devices will be mounted on heat sinks and will be used for illumination. Alphanumeric displays in dot matrix or bar formats are widely available. Special packages permit connection of LEDs to optical fibers for high-speed data communication links.

=== Miniature ===
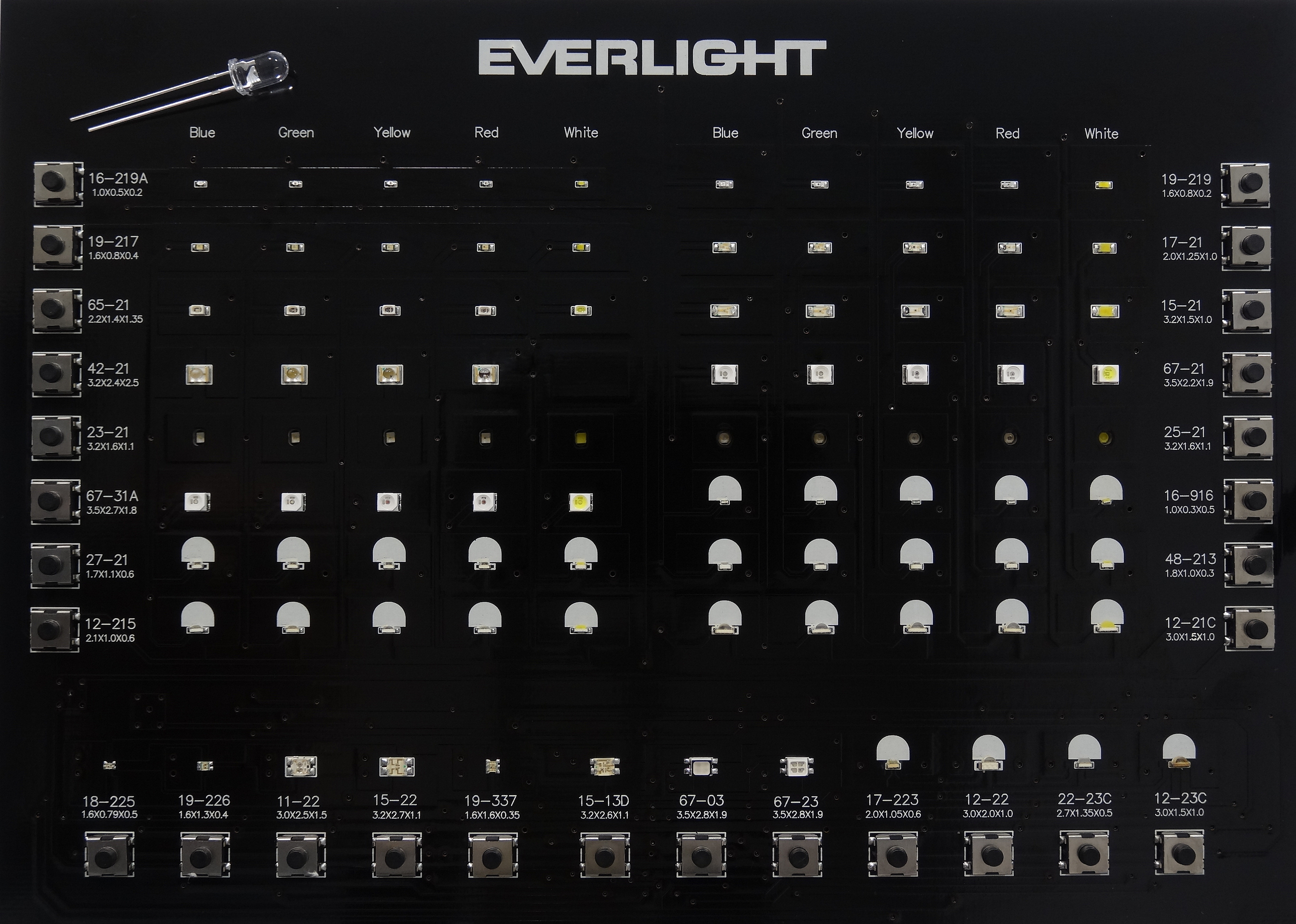
Image of miniature surface mount LEDs in most common sizes. They can be much smaller than a traditional 5 mm lamp-type LED, shown in the upper-left corner.

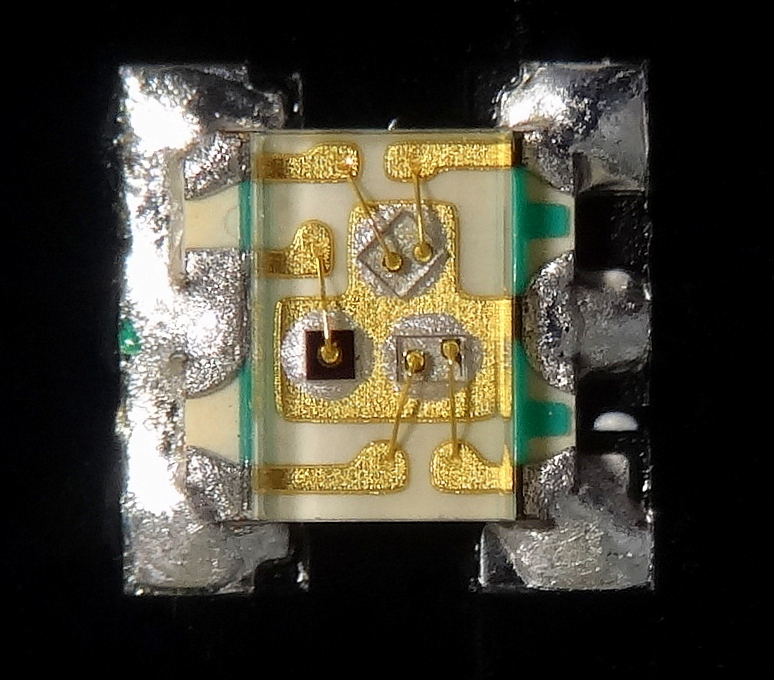
Very small (1.6×1.6×0.35 mm) red, green, and blue surface mount miniature LED package with gold wire bonding details

These are mostly single-die LEDs used as indicators, and they come in various sizes from 1.8 mm to 10 mm, through-hole and surface mount packages. Typical current ratings range from around 1 mA to above 20 mA. LEDs can be soldered to a flexible PCB strip to form LED tape popularly used for decoration.

Common package shapes include round, with a domed or flat top, rectangular with a flat top (as used in bar-graph displays), and triangular or square with a flat top. The encapsulation may also be clear or tinted to improve contrast and viewing angle. Infrared devices may have a black tint to block visible light while passing infrared radiation, such as the Osram SFH 4546.

5 V and 12 V LEDs are ordinary miniature LEDs that have a series resistor for direct connection to a 5 V or 12 V supply.

=== High-power ===
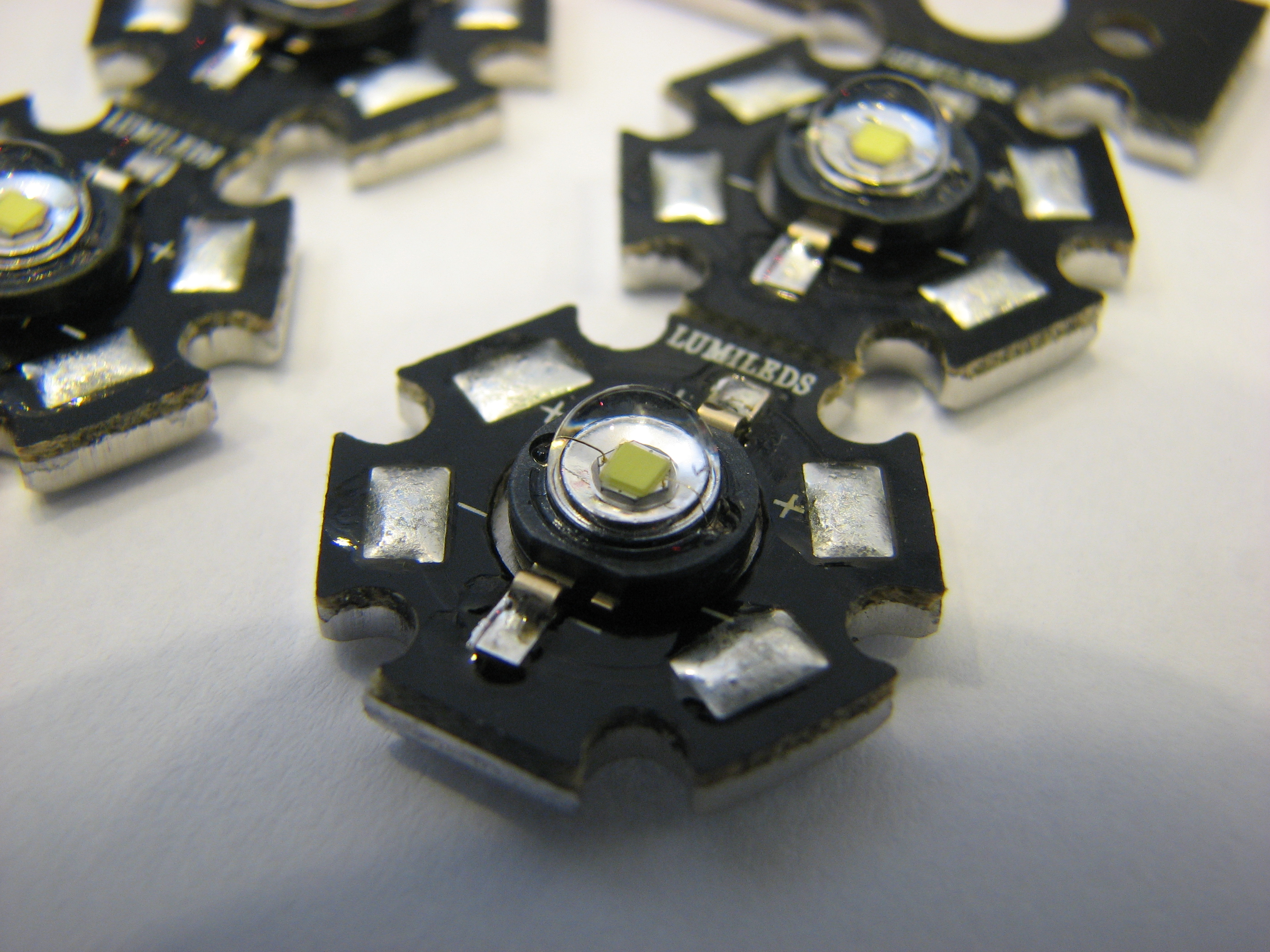
High-power light-emitting diodes attached to an LED star base (Luxeon, Lumileds)

High-power LEDs (HP-LEDs) or high-output LEDs (HO-LEDs) can be driven at currents from hundreds of mA to more than an ampere, compared with the tens of mA for other LEDs. Some can emit over a thousand lumens. LED power densities up to 300 W/cm^{2} have been achieved. Since overheating is destructive, the HP-LEDs must be mounted on a heat sink to allow for heat dissipation. If the heat from an HP-LED is not removed, the device fails in seconds. One HP-LED can often replace an incandescent bulb in a flashlight, or be set in an array to form a powerful LED lamp.

Some HP-LEDs in this category are the Nichia 19 series, Lumileds Rebel Led, Osram Opto Semiconductors Golden Dragon, and Cree X-lamp. As of September 2009, some HP-LEDs manufactured by Cree exceed 105 lm/W.

Examples for Haitz's law—which predicts an exponential rise in light output and efficacy of LEDs over time—are the CREE XP-G series LED, which achieved 105 lm/W in 2009 and the Nichia 19 series with a typical efficacy of 140 lm/W, released in 2010.

=== AC-driven ===
LEDs developed by Seoul Semiconductor can operate on AC power without a DC converter. For each half-cycle, part of the LED emits light and part is dark, and this is reversed during the next half-cycle. The efficiency of this type of HP-LED is typically 40 lm/W. A large number of LED elements in series may be able to operate directly from line voltage. In 2009, Seoul Semiconductor released a high DC voltage LED, named 'Acrich MJT', capable of being driven from AC power with a simple controlling circuit. The low-power dissipation of these LEDs affords them more flexibility than the original AC LED design.

=== Strip ===
An LED strip light is a flexible circuit board populated by surface-mount LEDs and other components that usually comes with an adhesive backing. LED lamps have been widely adopted in personal, professional, and hobbyist environments for their aesthetic, functionality, and flexibility. Traditionally, strip lights had been used solely in accent lighting, backlighting, task lighting, and decorative lighting applications, such as cove lighting.

LED strip lights were first produced in the early 2000s. Since then, increased luminous efficacy and higher-power SMDs have allowed them to be used in applications such as high brightness task lighting, fluorescent and halogen lighting fixture replacements, indirect lighting applications, ultraviolet inspection during manufacturing processes, set and costume design, and growing plants.

There are many types of LED Strips each with different codenames and LED types. Each one can vary in input power, LED spacing, color capability and more.

=== Application-specific ===
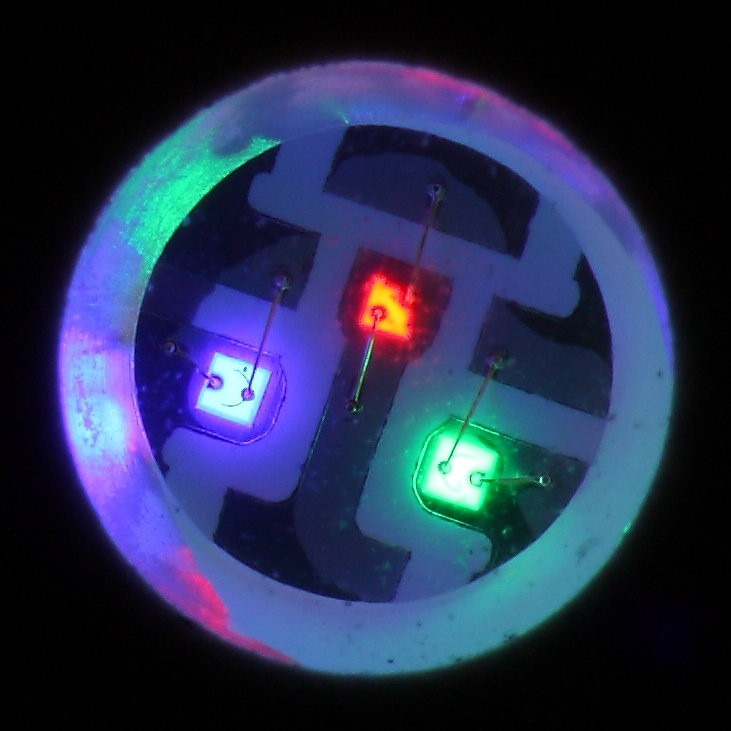
RGB-SMD-LED

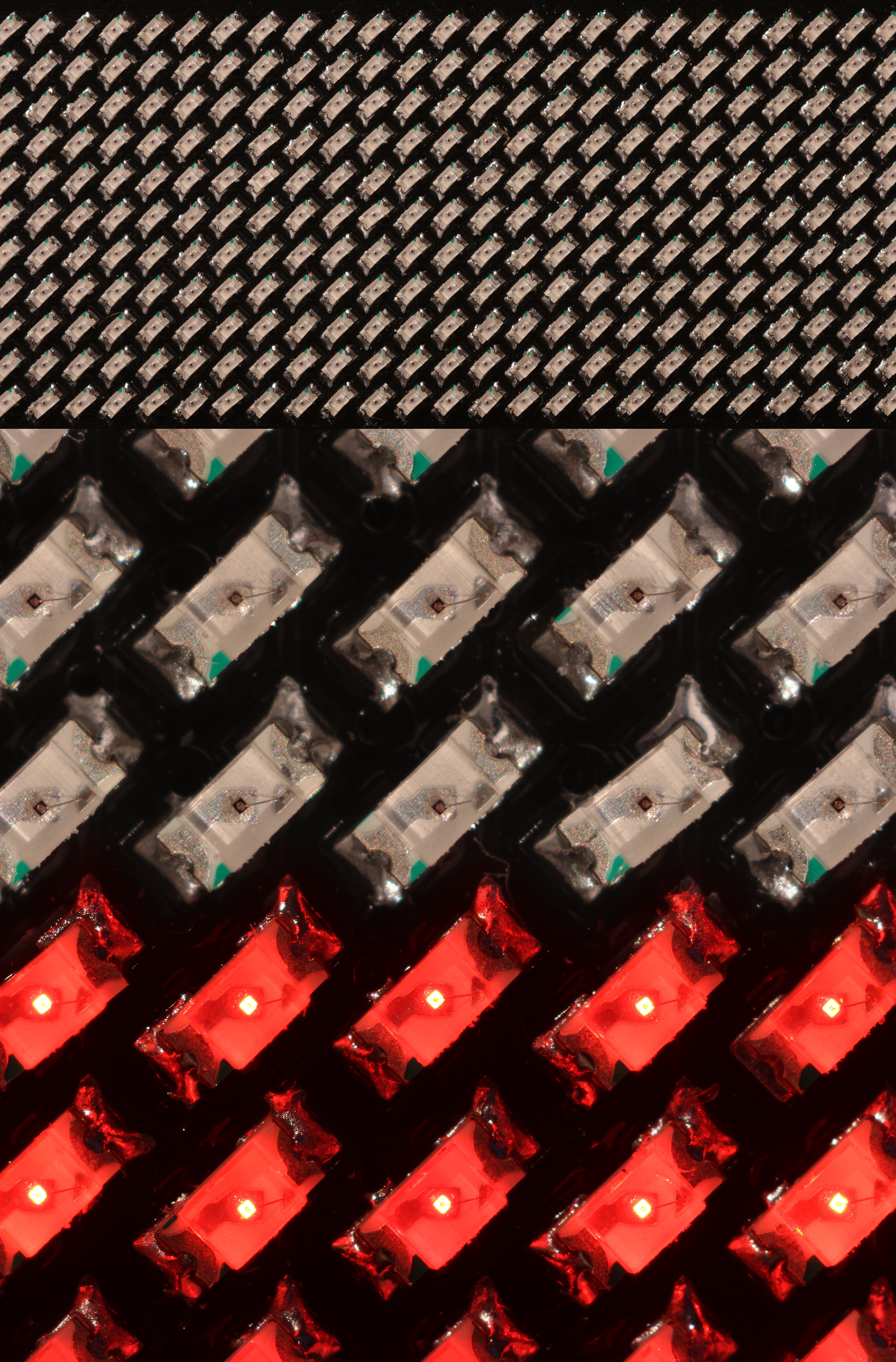
Composite image of an 11 × 44 LED matrix lapel name tag display using 1608/0603-type SMD LEDs. Top: A little over half of the 21 × 86 mm display. Center: Close-up of LEDs in ambient light. Bottom: LEDs in their own red light.

Flashing
Flashing LEDs are used as attention-seeking indicators without requiring external electronics. Flashing LEDs resemble standard LEDs but they contain an integrated voltage regulator and a multivibrator circuit that causes the LED to flash with a typical period of one second. In diffused lens LEDs, this circuit is visible as a small black dot. Most flashing LEDs emit light of one color, but more sophisticated devices can flash between multiple colors and even fade through a color sequence using RGB color mixing. Flashing SMD LEDs in the 0805 and other size formats have been available since early 2019.
Flickering

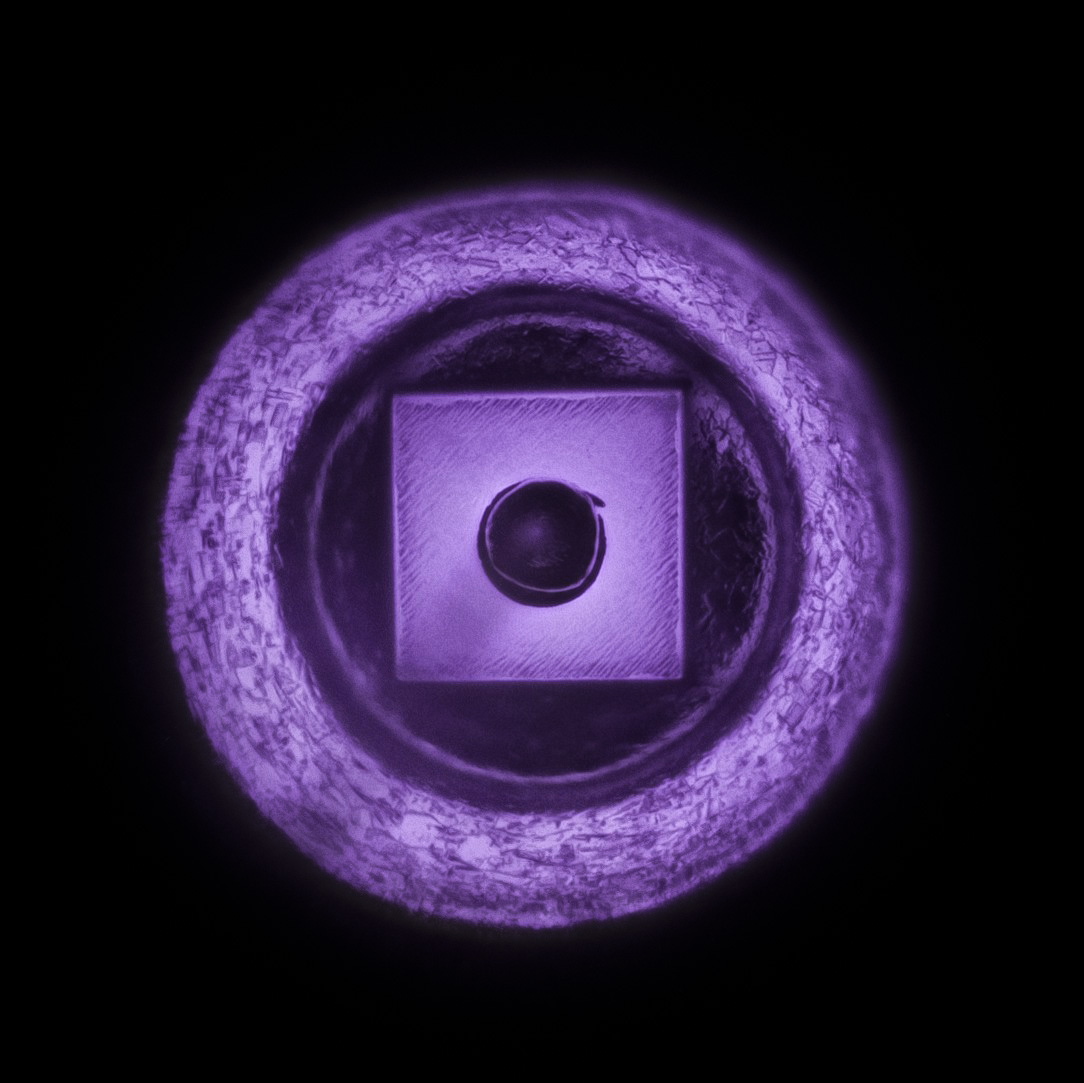
Infrared light from the LED die of IR LED as seen by a digital camera

Simple electronic circuits integrated into the LED package have been around since at least 2011, which produce a random LED intensity pattern reminiscent of a flickering candle. Reverse engineering in 2024 has suggested that some flickering LEDs with automatic sleep and wake modes might be using an integrated 8-bit microcontroller for such functionally. Sometimes a flickering effect might happen due to an electric malfunction.
Bi-color
Bi-color LEDs contain two different LED emitters in one case. There are two types of these. One type consists of two dies connected to the same two leads antiparallel to each other. Current flow in one direction emits one color, and current in the opposite direction emits the other color. The other type consists of two dies with separate leads for both dies and another lead for a common anode or cathode so that they can be controlled independently. The most common bi-color combination is red/traditional green. Others include amber/traditional green, red/pure green, red/blue, and blue/pure green.
RGB tri-color
Tri-color LEDs contain three different LED emitters in one case. Each emitter is connected to a separate lead so they can be controlled independently. A four-lead arrangement is typical with one common lead (anode or cathode) and an additional lead for each color. Others have only two leads (positive and negative) and have a built-in electronic controller. RGB LEDs consist of one red, one green, and one blue LED. By independently adjusting each of the three, RGB LEDs are capable of producing a wide color gamut. Unlike dedicated-color LEDs, these do not produce pure wavelengths. Modules may not be optimized for smooth color mixing.
Decorative-multicolor
Decorative-multicolor LEDs incorporate several emitters of different colors supplied by only two lead-out wires. Colors are switched internally by varying the supply voltage.
Alphanumeric
Alphanumeric LEDs are available in seven-segment, starburst, and dot-matrix format. Seven-segment displays handle all numbers and a limited set of letters. Starburst displays can display all letters. Dot-matrix displays typically use 5×7 pixels per character. Seven-segment LED displays were in widespread use in the 1970s and 1980s, but rising use of liquid-crystal displays, with their lower power needs and greater display flexibility, has reduced the popularity of numeric and alphanumeric LED displays.
Digital RGB
Digital RGB addressable LEDs contain their own "smart" control electronics. In addition to power and ground, these provide connections for data-in, data-out, clock and sometimes a strobe signal. These are connected in a daisy chain, which allows individual LEDs in a long LED strip light to be easily controlled by a microcontroller. Data sent to the first LED of the chain can control the brightness and color of each LED independently of the others. They are used where a combination of maximum control and minimum visible electronics is needed, such as strings for Christmas and LED matrices. Some even have refresh rates in the kHz range, allowing for basic video applications. These devices are known by their part number (WS2812 being common) or a brand name such as NeoPixel.
Filament
An LED filament consists of multiple LED chips connected in series on a common longitudinal substrate that forms a thin rod reminiscent of a traditional incandescent filament. These are being used as a low-cost decorative alternative for traditional light bulbs that are being phased out in many countries. The filaments use a rather high voltage, allowing them to work efficiently with mains voltages. Often a simple rectifier and capacitive current limiting are employed to create a low-cost replacement for a traditional light bulb without the complexity of the low voltage, high current converter that single die LEDs need. Usually, they are packaged in bulb similar to the lamps they were designed to replace, and filled with inert gas at slightly lower than ambient pressure to remove heat efficiently and prevent corrosion.
Chip-on-board arrays
Surface-mounted LEDs are frequently produced in chip on board (COB) arrays, allowing better heat dissipation than with a single LED of comparable luminous output. The LEDs can be arranged around a cylinder, and are called "corn cob lights" because of the rows of yellow LEDs.

== Considerations for use ==
- Efficiency: LEDs emit more lumens per watt than incandescent light bulbs. The efficiency of LED lighting fixtures is not affected by shape and size, unlike fluorescent light bulbs or tubes.
- Size: LEDs can be very small (smaller than 2 mm^{2}) and are easily attached to printed circuit boards.

=== Power sources ===
Simple LED circuit with resistor for current limiting

The current in an LED or other diodes rises exponentially with the applied voltage (see Shockley diode equation), so a small change in voltage can cause a large change in current. Current through the LED must be regulated by an external circuit such as a constant current source to prevent damage.

LEDs are sensitive to voltage. They must be supplied with a voltage above their threshold voltage and a current below their rating. Current and lifetime change greatly with a small change in applied voltage. They thus require a current-regulated supply (usually just a series resistor for indicator LEDs).

Efficiency droop: The efficiency of LEDs decreases as the electric current increases. Heating also increases with higher currents, which compromises LED lifetime. These effects put practical limits on the current through an LED in high-power applications.

=== Electrical polarity ===
Unlike a traditional incandescent lamp, an LED will light only when voltage is applied in the forward direction of the diode. No current flows and no light is emitted if voltage is applied in the reverse direction. If the reverse voltage exceeds the breakdown voltage, which is typically about five volts, a large current flows and the LED will be damaged.

By definition, the energy band gap of any diode is higher when reverse-biased than when forward-biased. Because the band gap energy determines the wavelength of the light emitted, the color cannot be the same when reverse-biased. The reverse breakdown voltage is sufficiently high that the emitted wavelength cannot be similar enough to still be visible. Though dual-LED packages exist that contain a different color LED in each direction, it is not expected that any single LED element can emit visible light when reverse-biased.

It is not known if any Zener diode could exist that emits light only in reverse-bias mode. Uniquely, this type of LED would conduct when connected backwards.

=== Appearance ===
- Color: LEDs can emit light of an intended color without using any color filters, as traditional lighting methods need. This is more efficient and can lower initial costs.
- Cool light: In contrast to most light sources, LEDs radiate very little heat in the form of IR that can cause damage to sensitive objects or fabrics. Wasted energy is dispersed as heat through the base of the LED.
- Color rendition: Most cool-white LEDs have spectra that differ significantly from a black body radiator like the sun or an incandescent light. The spike at 460 nm and dip at 500 nm can make the color of objects appear differently under cool-white LED illumination than sunlight or incandescent sources, due to metamerism, red surfaces being rendered particularly poorly by typical phosphor-based cool-white LEDs. The same is true with green surfaces. The quality of color rendition of an LED is measured by the Color Rendering Index (CRI).
- Dimming: LEDs can be dimmed either by pulse-width modulation or lowering the forward current. This pulse-width modulation is why LED lights, particularly headlights on cars, when viewed on camera or by some people, seem to flash or flicker. This is a type of stroboscopic effect.

=== Light properties ===
- Switch-on time: LEDs light up extremely quickly. A typical red indicator LED achieves full brightness in under a microsecond. LEDs used in communications devices can have even faster response times.
- Focus: The solid package of the LED can be designed to focus its light. Incandescent and fluorescent sources often require an external reflector to collect light and direct it in a usable manner. For larger LED packages, total internal reflection (TIR) lenses are often used to the same effect. When large quantities of light are needed, many light sources such as LED chips are usually deployed, which are difficult to focus or collimate on the same target.
- Area light source: Single LEDs do not approximate a point source of light giving a spherical light distribution, but rather a lambertian distribution. So, LEDs are difficult to apply to uses needing a spherical light field. Different fields of light can be manipulated by the application of different optics or "lenses". LEDs cannot provide divergence below a few degrees.

=== Reliability ===
- Shock resistance: LEDs, being solid-state components, are difficult to damage with external shock, unlike fluorescent and incandescent bulbs, which are fragile.
- Thermal runaway: Parallel strings of LEDs will not share current evenly due to the manufacturing tolerances in their forward voltage. Running two or more strings from a single current source may result in LED failure as the devices warm up. If forward voltage binning is not possible, a circuit is required to ensure even distribution of current between parallel strands.
- Slow failure: LEDs mainly fail by dimming over time, rather than the abrupt failure of incandescent bulbs.
- Lifetime: LEDs can have a relatively long useful life. One report estimates 35,000 to 50,000 hours of useful life for white LEDs, though time to complete failure may be shorter or longer. Fluorescent tubes typically are rated at about 10,000 to 25,000 hours, depending partly on the conditions of use, and incandescent light bulbs at 1,000 to 2,000 hours. Several DOE demonstrations have shown that reduced maintenance costs from this extended lifetime, rather than energy savings, is the primary factor in determining the payback period for an LED product.
- Cycling: LEDs are ideal for uses subject to frequent on-off cycling, unlike incandescent and fluorescent lamps that fail faster when cycled often, or high-intensity discharge lamps (HID lamps) that require a long time to warm up to full output and to cool down before they can be lighted again if they are being restarted.
- Temperature dependence: LED performance largely depends on the ambient temperature of the operating environment – or thermal management properties. Overdriving an LED in high ambient temperatures may result in overheating the LED package, eventually leading to device failure. An adequate heat sink is needed to maintain long life. This is especially important in automotive, medical, and military uses where devices must operate over a wide range of temperatures and require low failure rates.

== Manufacturing ==
LED manufacturing involves multiple steps, including epitaxy, chip processing, chip separation, and packaging.

In a typical LED manufacturing process, encapsulation is performed after probing, dicing, die transfer from wafer to package, and wire bonding or flip chip mounting, perhaps using indium tin oxide, a transparent electrical conductor. In this case, the bond wire(s) are attached to the ITO film that has been deposited in the LEDs.

Flip chip circuit on board (COB) is a technique that can be used to manufacture LEDs.

== Colors and materials ==
Conventional LEDs are made from a variety of inorganic semiconductor materials. The following table shows the available colors with wavelength range, voltage drop and material:

Color	Wavelength (nm)	Voltage (V)	Semiconductor material
Infrared	λ > 760	ΔV < 1.9	Gallium arsenide (GaAs); Aluminium gallium arsenide (AlGaAs)
Red	610 < λ < 760	1.63 < ΔV < 2.03	Aluminium gallium arsenide (AlGaAs); Gallium arsenide phosphide (GaAsP); Aluminium gallium indium phosphide (AlGaInP); Gallium(III) phosphide (GaP)
Orange	590 < λ < 610	2.03 < ΔV < 2.10	Gallium arsenide phosphide (GaAsP); Aluminium gallium indium phosphide (AlGaInP); Gallium(III) phosphide (GaP)
Yellow	570 < λ < 590	2.10 < ΔV < 2.18	Gallium arsenide phosphide (GaAsP); Aluminium gallium indium phosphide (AlGaInP); Gallium(III) phosphide (GaP)
Green	500 < λ < 570	1.9 < ΔV < 4.0	Indium gallium nitride (InGaN) / Gallium(III) nitride (GaN); Gallium(III) phosphide (GaP); Aluminium gallium indium phosphide (AlGaInP); Aluminium gallium phosphide (AlGaP)
Blue	450 < λ < 500	2.48 < ΔV < 3.7	Zinc selenide (ZnSe); Indium gallium nitride (InGaN); Silicon carbide (SiC) as substrate; Silicon (Si) as substrate — (under development)
Violet	400 < λ < 450	2.76 < ΔV < 4.0	Indium gallium nitride (InGaN)
Purple	multiple types	2.48 < ΔV < 3.7	Generally not via band gap manipulation: dual blue/red LEDs, blue with red phosphor, or white with purple plastic
Ultraviolet	λ < 400	3.1 < ΔV < 4.4	Aluminium nitride (AlN) (210 nm); Aluminium gallium indium nitride (AlGaInN) — (down to 210 nm); Aluminium gallium nitride (AlGaN); Boron nitride (215 nm); Diamond (235 nm); (The three sub-bands of UV, UVA, UVB, and UVC, each have different uses. See black light, UV-B lamps, and ultraviolet germicidal irradiation.)
White	Broad spectrum	2.7 < ΔV < 3.5	Blue diode with yellow phosphor or violet/UV diode with multi-color phosphor

== Applications ==
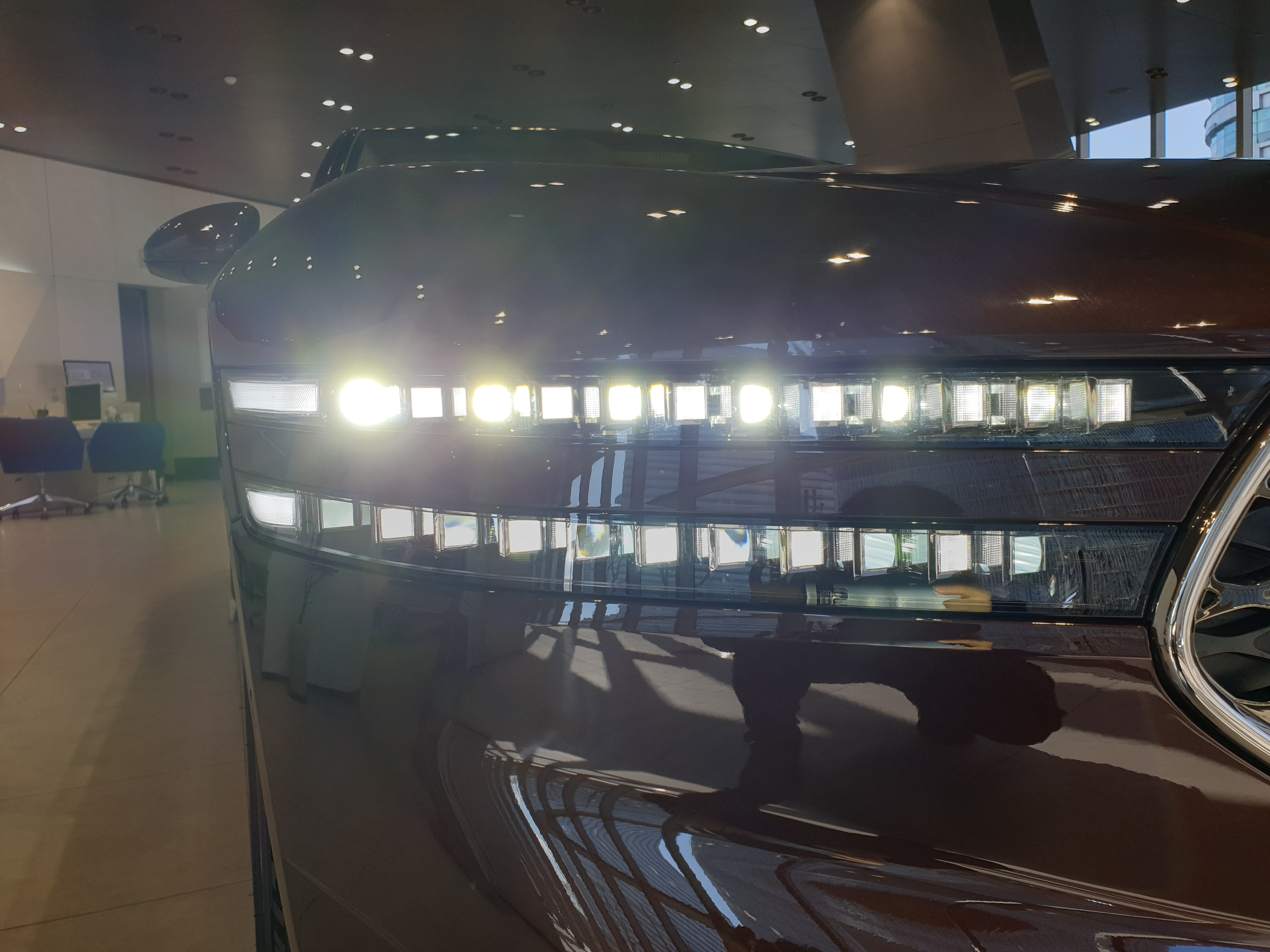
LED-Headlights of an automobile

LED uses fall into five major categories:

- Visual signals where light goes more or less directly from the source to the human eye, to convey a message or meaning
- Illumination where light is reflected from objects to give a visual response of these objects
- Measuring and interacting with processes involving no human vision
- Narrow-band light sensors where LEDs operate in a reverse-bias mode and respond to incident light, instead of emitting light
- Indoor cultivation, including cannabis.

The application of LEDs in horticulture has revolutionized plant cultivation by providing energy-efficient, customizable lighting solutions that optimize plant growth and development. LEDs offer precise control over light spectra, intensity, and photoperiods, enabling growers to tailor lighting conditions to the specific needs of different plant species and growth stages. This technology enhances photosynthesis, improves crop yields, and reduces energy costs compared to traditional lighting systems. Additionally, LEDs generate less heat, allowing closer placement to plants without risking thermal damage, and contribute to sustainable farming practices by lowering carbon footprints and extending growing seasons in controlled environments. Light spectrum affects growth, metabolite profile, and resistance against fungal phytopathogens of Solanum lycopersicum seedlings. LEDs can also be used in micropropagation.

=== Indicators and signs ===
The low energy consumption, low maintenance and small size of LEDs have led to uses as status indicators and displays on a variety of equipment and installations. Large-area LED displays are used as stadium displays, dynamic decorative displays, and dynamic message signs on freeways. Thin, lightweight message displays are used at airports and railway stations, and as destination displays for trains, buses, trams, and ferries.

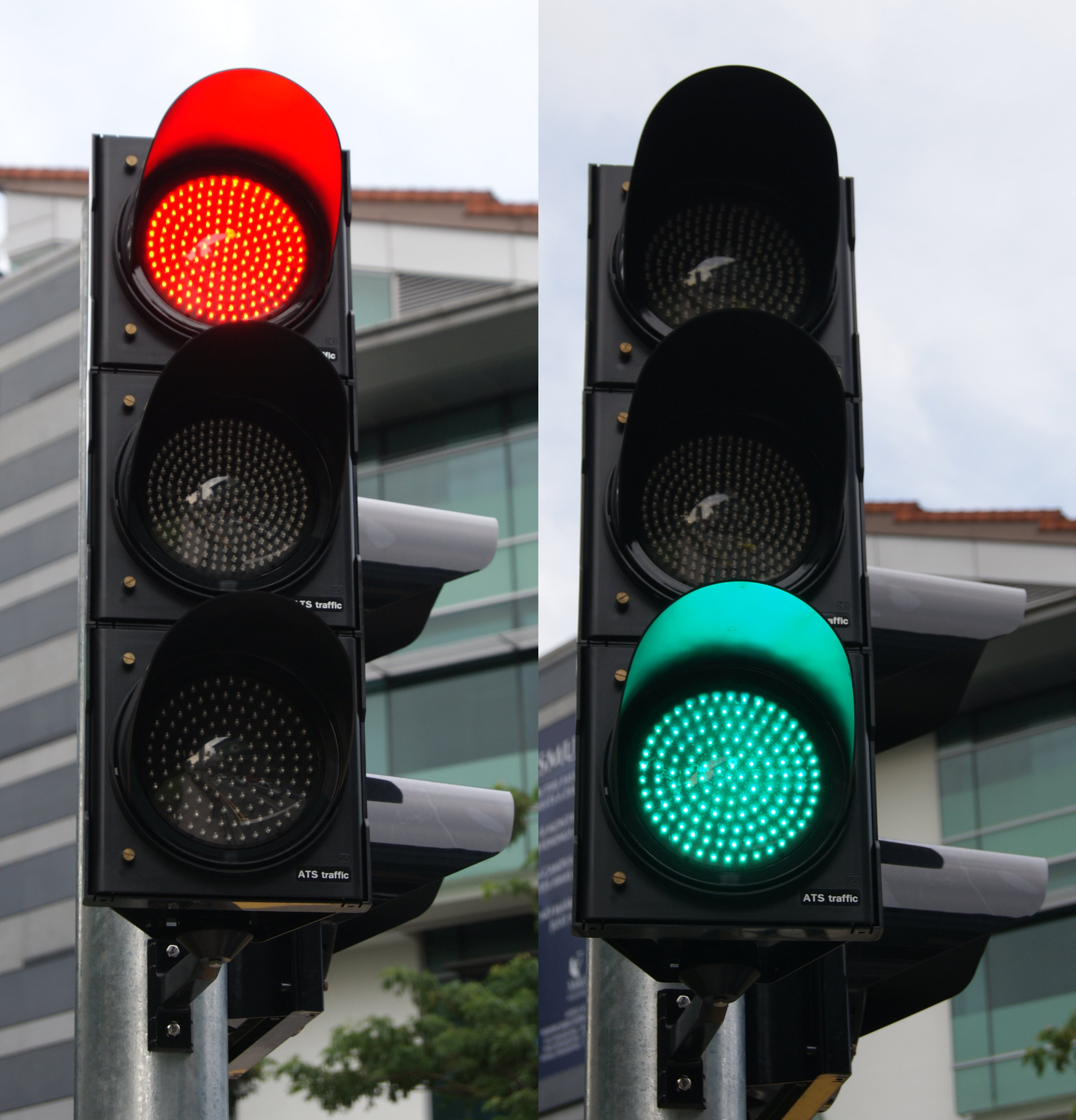
Red and green LED traffic signals

One-color light is well suited for traffic lights and signals, exit signs, emergency vehicle lighting, ships' navigation lights, and LED-based Christmas lights.

Because of their long life, fast switching times, and visibility in broad daylight due to their high output and focus, LEDs have been used in automotive brake lights and turn signals. The use in brakes improves safety due to a great reduction in the time needed to light fully, or faster rise time, about 200 milliseconds faster than an incandescent bulb. This gives drivers behind more time to react. In a dual intensity circuit (rear markers and brakes), if the LEDs are not pulsed at a fast enough frequency, they can create a phantom array, where ghost images of the LED appear if the eyes quickly scan across the array. White LED headlamps are beginning to appear. Using LEDs has styling advantages because LEDs can form much thinner lights than incandescent lamps with parabolic reflectors.

Due to the relative cheapness of low-output LEDs, they are also used in many temporary uses such as glowsticks and throwies. Artists have also used LEDs for LED art.

=== Lighting ===
With the development of high-efficiency and high-power LEDs, it has become possible to use LEDs in lighting and illumination. To encourage the shift to LED lamps and other high-efficiency lighting, in 2008 the US Department of Energy created the L Prize competition. The Philips Lighting North America LED bulb won the first competition on August 3, 2011, after successfully completing 18 months of intensive field, lab, and product testing.

Efficient lighting is needed for sustainable architecture. As of 2011, some LED bulbs provide up to 150 lm/W and even inexpensive low-end models typically exceed 50 lm/W, so that a 6-watt LED could achieve the same results as a standard 40-watt incandescent bulb. The lower heat output of LEDs also reduces demand on air conditioning systems. Worldwide, LEDs are rapidly adopted to displace less effective sources such as incandescent lamps and CFLs and reduce electrical energy consumption and its associated emissions. Solar-powered LEDs are used as street lights and in architectural lighting.

The mechanical robustness and long lifetime are used in automotive lighting on cars, motorcycles, and bicycle lights. LED street lights are employed on poles and in parking garages. In 2007, the Italian village of Torraca was the first place to convert its street lighting to LEDs.

Cabin lighting on recent Airbus and Boeing jetliners uses LED lighting. LEDs are also being used in airport and heliport lighting. LED airport fixtures currently include medium-intensity runway lights, runway centerline lights, taxiway centerline and edge lights, guidance signs, and obstruction lighting.

LEDs are also used as a light source for DLP projectors, and to backlight newer LCD televisions (referred to as LED TV), computer monitors (including laptop) and handheld device LCDs, succeeding older CCFL-backlit LCDs although being superseded by OLED screens. RGB LEDs raise the color gamut by as much as 45%. Screens for TV and computer displays can be made thinner using LEDs for backlighting.

LEDs are small, durable and need little power, so they are used in handheld devices such as flashlights. LED strobe lights or camera flashes operate at a safe, low voltage, instead of the 250+ volts commonly found in xenon flashlamp-based lighting. This is especially useful in cameras on mobile phones, where space is at a premium and bulky voltage-raising circuitry is undesirable.

LEDs are used for infrared illumination in night vision uses including security cameras. A ring of LEDs around a video camera, aimed forward into a retroreflective background, allows chroma keying in video productions.

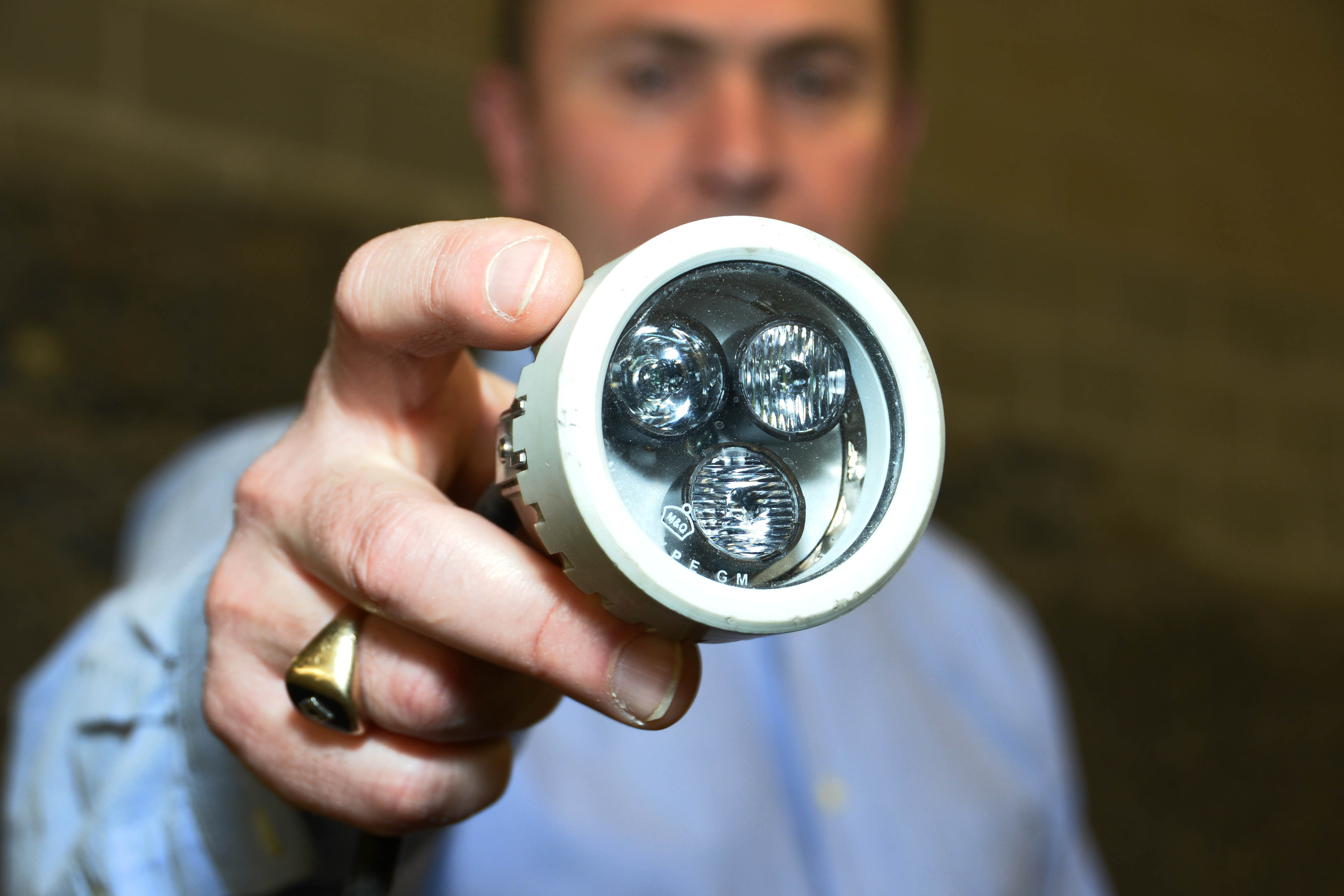
LED for miners, to increase visibility inside mines

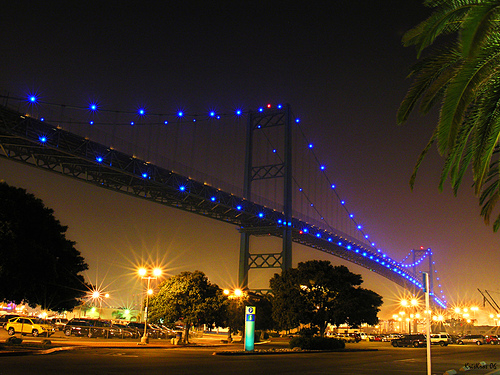
Los Angeles Vincent Thomas Bridge illuminated with blue LEDs

LEDs are used in mining operations as cap lamps to provide light for miners. Research has been done to improve LEDs for mining, to reduce glare and to increase illumination, reducing risk of injury to the miners.

LEDs are increasingly finding uses in medical and educational applications, for example as mood enhancement. NASA has even sponsored research for the use of LEDs to promote health for astronauts.

=== Data communication and other signaling ===
Light can be used to transmit data and analog signals. For example, lighting white LEDs can be used in systems assisting people to navigate in closed spaces while searching necessary rooms or objects.

Assistive listening devices in many theaters and similar spaces use arrays of infrared LEDs to send sound to listeners' receivers. Light-emitting diodes (as well as semiconductor lasers) are used to send data over many types of fiber optic cable, from digital audio over TOSLINK cables to the very high bandwidth fiber links that form the Internet backbone. For some time, computers were commonly equipped with IrDA interfaces, which allowed them to send and receive data to nearby machines via infrared.

Because LEDs can cycle on and off millions of times per second, very high data bandwidth can be achieved. For that reason, visible light communication (VLC) has been proposed as an alternative to the increasingly competitive radio bandwidth. VLC operates in the visible part of the electromagnetic spectrum, so data can be transmitted without occupying the frequencies of radio communications.

=== Machine vision systems ===
Machine vision systems often require bright and homogeneous illumination, so features of interest are easier to process. LEDs are often used.

Barcode scanners are the most common example of machine vision applications, and many of those scanners use red LEDs instead of lasers. Optical computer mice use LEDs as a light source for the miniature camera within the mouse.

LEDs are useful for machine vision because they provide a compact, reliable source of light. LED lamps can be turned on and off to suit the needs of the vision system, and the shape of the beam produced can be tailored to match the system's requirements.

=== Biological detection ===
The discovery of radiative recombination in aluminum gallium nitride (AlGaN) alloys by U.S. Army Research Laboratory (ARL) led to the conceptualization of UV light-emitting diodes (LEDs) to be incorporated in light-induced fluorescence sensors used for biological agent detection. In 2004, the Edgewood Chemical Biological Center (ECBC) initiated the effort to create a biological detector named TAC-BIO. The program capitalized on semiconductor UV optical sources (SUVOS) developed by the Defense Advanced Research Projects Agency (DARPA).

UV-induced fluorescence is one of the most robust techniques used for rapid real-time detection of biological aerosols. The first UV sensors were lasers lacking in-field-use practicality. In order to address this, DARPA incorporated SUVOS technology to create a low-cost, small, lightweight, low-power device. The TAC-BIO detector's response time was one minute from when it sensed a biological agent. It was also demonstrated that the detector could be operated unattended indoors and outdoors for weeks at a time.

Aerosolized biological particles fluoresce and scatter light under a UV light beam. Observed fluorescence is dependent on the applied wavelength and the biochemical fluorophores within the biological agent. UV-induced fluorescence offers a rapid, accurate, efficient and logistically practical way for biological agent detection. This is because the use of UV fluorescence is reagentless, or a process that does not require an added chemical to produce a reaction, with no consumables, or produces no chemical byproducts.

Additionally, TAC-BIO can reliably discriminate between threat and non-threat aerosols. It was claimed to be sensitive enough to detect low concentrations, but not so sensitive that it would cause false positives. The particle-counting algorithm used in the device converted raw data into information by counting the photon pulses per unit of time from the fluorescence and scattering detectors, and comparing the value to a set threshold.

The original TAC-BIO was introduced in 2010, while the second-generation TAC-BIO GEN II, was designed in 2015 to be more cost-efficient, as plastic parts were used. Its small, lightweight design allows it to be mounted to vehicles, robots, and unmanned aerial vehicles. The second-generation device could also be utilized as an environmental detector to monitor air quality in hospitals, airplanes, or even in households to detect fungus and mold.

=== Other applications ===
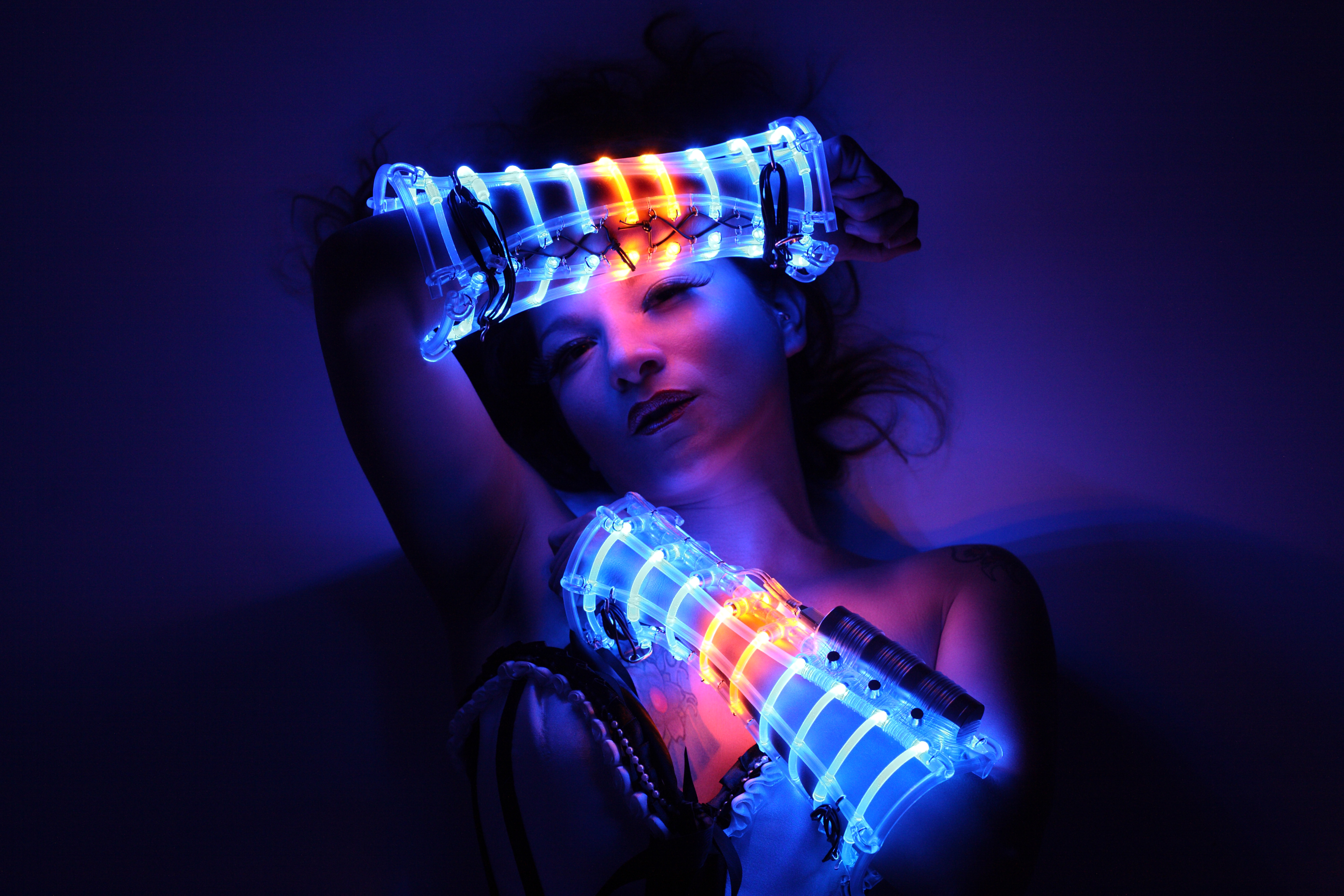
LED costume for stage performers

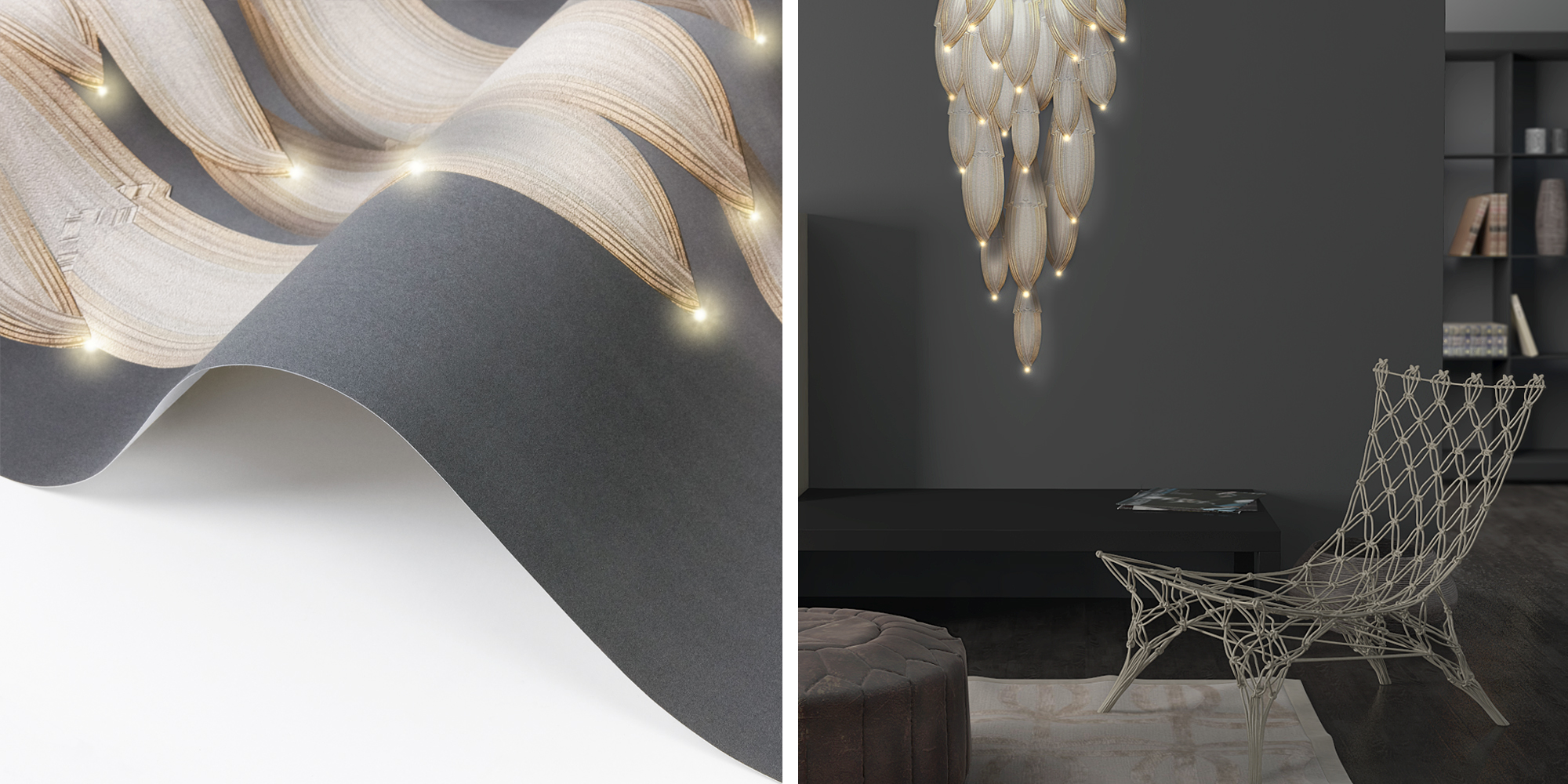
LED wallpaper by Meystyle

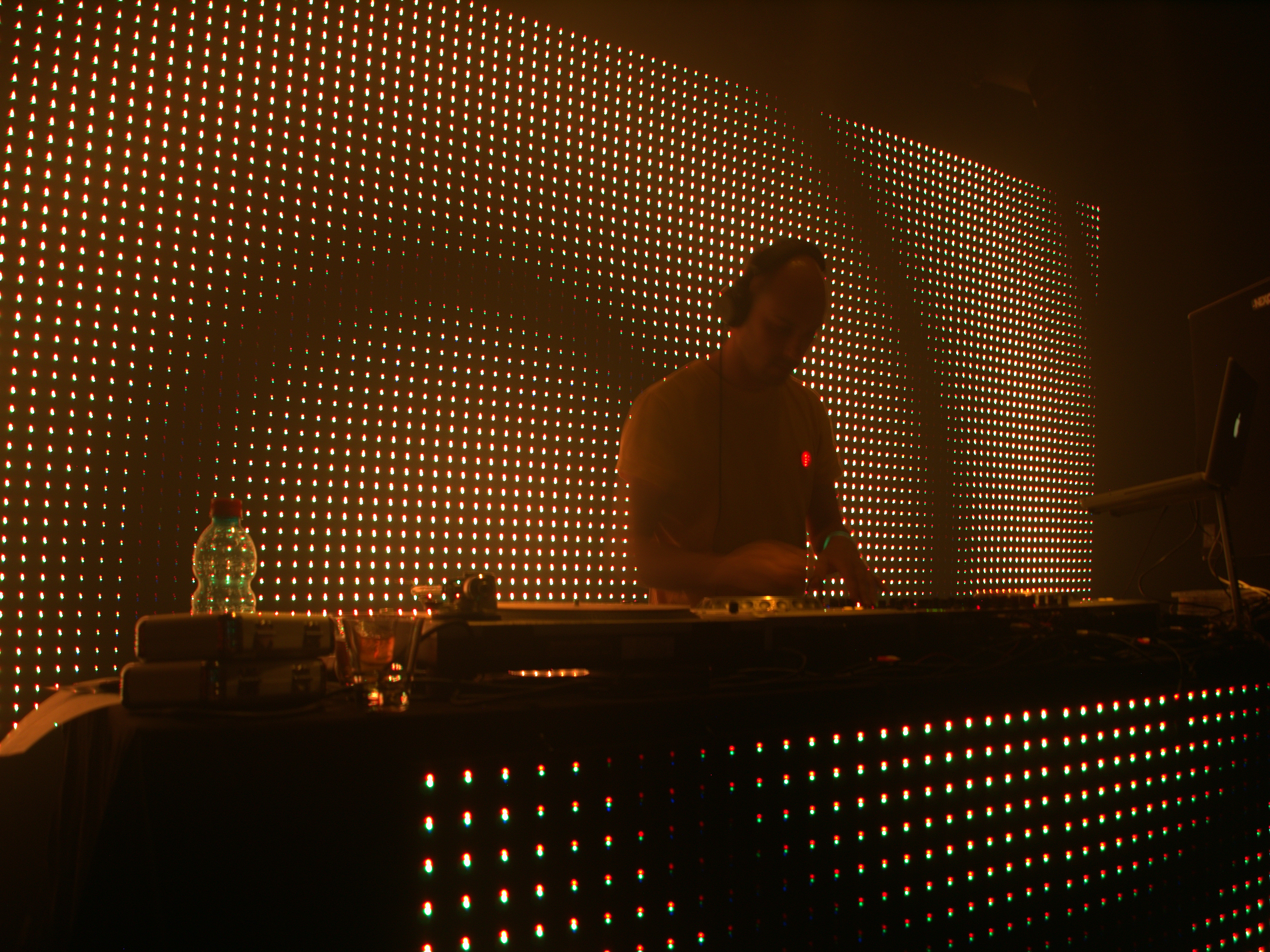
A large LED display behind a disc jockey

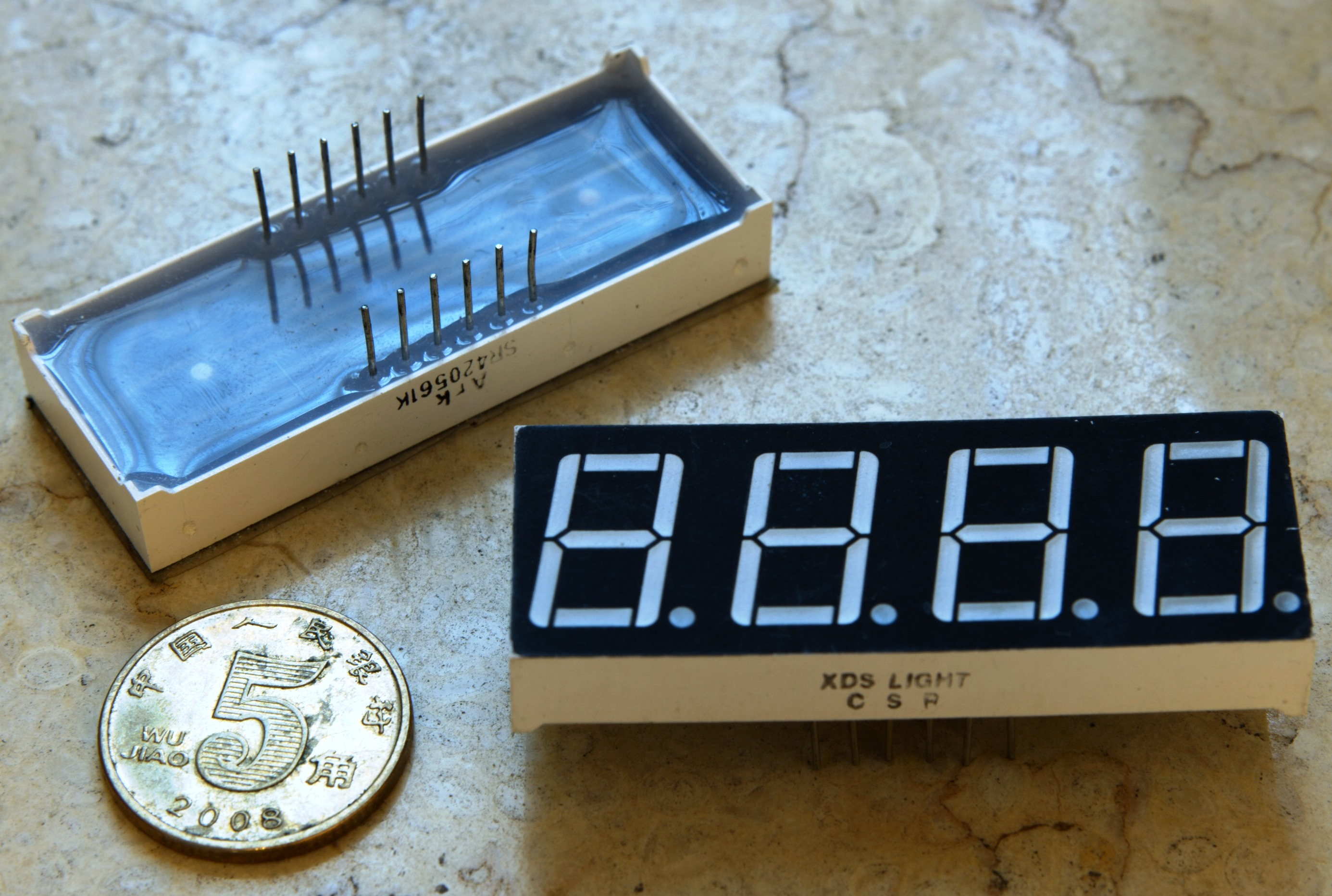
Seven-segment display that can display four digits and points

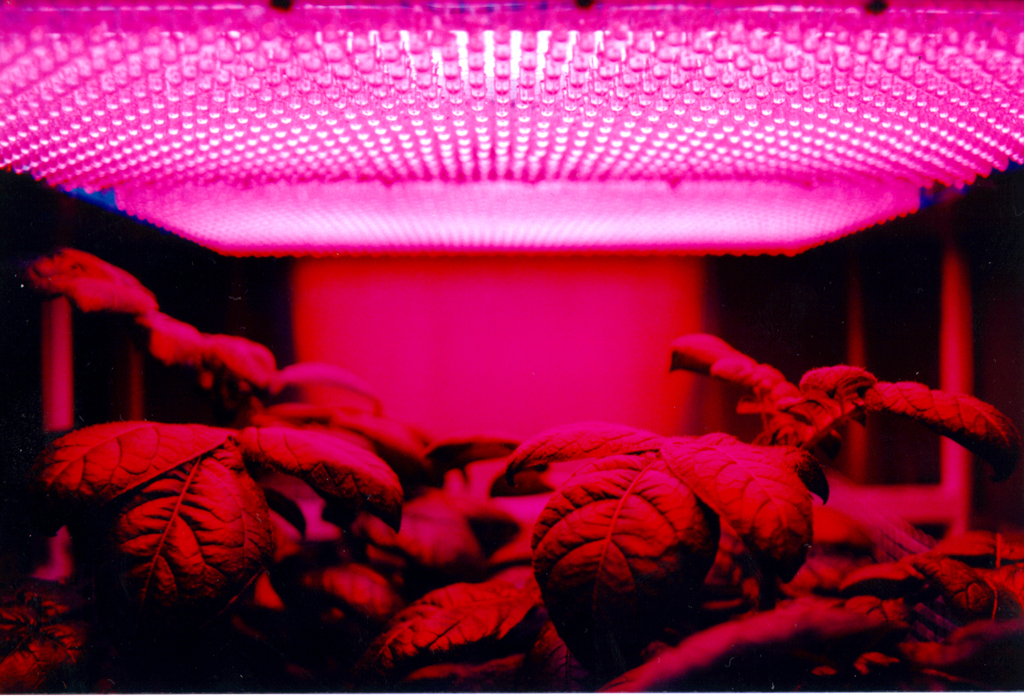
LED panel light source used in an early experiment on potato growth during Shuttle mission STS-73 to investigate the potential for growing food on future long-duration missions

The light from LEDs can be modulated very quickly so they are used extensively in optical fiber and free-space optics communications. This includes remote controls, such as for television sets, where infrared LEDs are often used. Opto-isolators use an LED combined with a photodiode or phototransistor to provide a signal path with electrical isolation between two circuits. This is especially useful in medical equipment where the signals from a low-voltage sensor circuit (usually battery-powered) in contact with a living organism must be electrically isolated from any possible electrical failure in a recording or monitoring device operating at potentially dangerous voltages. An opto-isolator also lets information be transferred between circuits that do not share a common ground potential.

Many sensor systems rely on light as the signal source. LEDs are often ideal as a light source due to the requirements of the sensors. The Nintendo Wii's sensor bar uses infrared LEDs. Pulse oximeters use them for measuring oxygen saturation. Some flatbed scanners use arrays of RGB LEDs rather than the typical cold-cathode fluorescent lamp as the light source. Having independent control of three illuminated colors allows the scanner to calibrate itself for more accurate color balance, and there is no need for warm-up. Further, its sensors need only be monochromatic, since at any one time the page being scanned is only lit by one color of light.

Since LEDs can also be used as photodiodes, they can be used for both photo emission and detection. This could be used, for example, in a touchscreen that registers reflected light from a finger or stylus. Many materials and biological systems are sensitive to, or dependent on, light. Grow lights use LEDs to increase photosynthesis in plants, and bacteria and viruses can be removed from water and other substances using UV LEDs for sterilization. LEDs of certain wavelengths have also been used for light therapy treatment of neonatal jaundice and acne.

UV LEDs, with spectra range of 220 nm to 395 nm, have other applications, such as water/air purification, surface disinfection, glue curing, free-space non-line-of-sight communication, high-performance liquid chromatography, UV curing dye printing, phototherapy (295 nm Vitamin D, 308 nm Excimer lamp or laser replacement), medical/ analytical instrumentation, and DNA absorption.

LEDs have also been used as a medium-quality voltage reference in electronic circuits. The forward voltage drop (about 1.7 V for a red LED or 1.2V for an infrared) can be used instead of a Zener diode in low-voltage regulators. Red LEDs have the flattest I/V curve above the knee. Nitride-based LEDs have a fairly steep I/V curve and are useless for this purpose. Although LED forward voltage is far more current-dependent than a Zener diode, Zener diodes with breakdown voltages below 3 V are not widely available.

The progressive miniaturization of low-voltage lighting technology, such as LEDs and OLEDs, suitable to incorporate into low-thickness materials has fostered experimentation in combining light sources and wall covering surfaces for interior walls in the form of LED wallpaper.

== Research and development ==
=== Key challenges ===
LEDs require optimized efficiency to hinge on ongoing improvements such as phosphor materials and quantum dots.

The process of down-conversion (the method by which materials convert more-energetic photons to different, less energetic colors) also needs improvement. For example, the red phosphors that are used today are thermally sensitive and need to be improved in that aspect so that they do not color shift and experience efficiency drop-off with temperature. Red phosphors could also benefit from a narrower spectral width to emit more lumens and become more efficient at converting photons.

In addition, work remains to be done in the realms of current efficiency droop, color shift, system reliability, light distribution, dimming, thermal management, and power supply performance.

Early suspicions were that the LED droop was caused by elevated temperatures. Scientists showed that temperature was not the root cause of efficiency droop. The mechanism causing efficiency droop was identified in 2007 as Auger recombination, which was taken with mixed reaction. A 2013 study conclusively identified Auger recombination as the cause.

=== Potential technology ===
A new family of LEDs are based on the semiconductors called perovskites. In 2018, less than four years after their discovery, the ability of perovskite LEDs (PLEDs) to produce light from electrons already rivaled those of the best performing OLEDs. They have a potential for cost-effectiveness as they can be processed from solution, a low-cost and low-tech method, which might allow perovskite-based devices that have large areas to be made with extremely low cost. Their efficiency is superior by eliminating non-radiative losses, in other words, elimination of recombination pathways that do not produce photons; or by solving outcoupling problem (prevalent for thin-film LEDs) or balancing charge carrier injection to increase the EQE (external quantum efficiency). The most up-to-date PLED devices have broken the performance barrier by shooting the EQE above 20%.

In 2018, Cao et al. and Lin et al. independently published two papers on developing perovskite LEDs with EQE greater than 20%, which made these two papers a milestone in PLED development. Their devices have a similar planar structure, i.e., the active layer (perovskite) is sandwiched between two electrodes. To achieve a high EQE, they not only reduced non-radiative recombination, but also utilized their own, subtly different methods to improve the EQE.

In the work of Cao et al., researchers targeted the outcoupling problem, which is that the optical physics of thin-film LEDs causes the majority of light generated by the semiconductor to be trapped in the device. To achieve this goal, they demonstrated that solution-processed perovskites can spontaneously form submicrometre-scale crystal platelets, which can efficiently extract light from the device. These perovskites are formed via the introduction of amino acid additives into the perovskite precursor solutions. In addition, their method is able to passivate perovskite surface defects and reduce nonradiative recombination. Therefore, by improving the light outcoupling and reducing nonradiative losses, Cao and his colleagues successfully achieved PLED with EQE up to 20.7%.

Lin and his colleague used a different approach to generate high EQE. Instead of modifying the microstructure of the perovskite layer, they chose to adopt a new strategy for managing the compositional distribution in the device—an approach that simultaneously provides high luminescence and balanced charge injection. In other words, they still used a flat emissive layer, but tried to optimize the balance of electrons and holes injected into the perovskite, so as to make the most efficient use of the charge carriers. Moreover, in the perovskite layer, the crystals are perfectly enclosed by MABr additive (where MA is CH_{3}NH_{3}). The MABr shell passivates the nonradiative defects that would otherwise be present in perovskite crystals, resulting in a reduction of nonradiative recombination. Therefore, by balancing charge injection and decreasing nonradiative losses, Lin and his colleagues developed PLED with EQE up to 20.3%.

== Health and safety ==
Certain blue LEDs and cool-white LEDs can exceed safe limits of the so-called blue-light hazard as defined in eye safety specifications such as "ANSI/IESNA RP-27.1–05: Recommended Practice for Photobiological Safety for Lamp and Lamp Systems". One study showed no evidence of a risk in normal use at domestic illuminance, and that caution is only needed for particular occupational situations or for specific populations. In 2006, the International Electrotechnical Commission published IEC 62471 Photobiological safety of lamps and lamp systems, replacing the application of early laser-oriented standards for classification of LED sources.

While LEDs have the advantage over fluorescent lamps, in that they do not contain mercury, they may contain other hazardous metals such as lead and arsenic.

In 2016, the American Medical Association (AMA) issued a statement concerning the possible adverse influence of bluish street lighting on the sleep-wake cycle of city-dwellers. Critics in the industry claim exposure levels are not high enough to have a noticeable effect.

== Environmental issues ==
- Light pollution: Because white LEDs emit more short-wavelength light than sources such as high-pressure sodium vapor lamps, the increased blue and green sensitivity of scotopic vision means that white LEDs used in outdoor lighting cause substantially more sky glow.
- Impact on wildlife: LEDs are much more attractive to insects than sodium-vapor lights, so much so that there has been speculative concern about the possibility of disruption to food webs. LED lighting near beaches, particularly intense blue and white colors, can disorient turtle hatchlings and make them wander inland instead. The use of "turtle-safe lighting" LEDs that emit only at narrow portions of the visible spectrum is encouraged by conservancy groups in order to reduce harm.
- Use in winter conditions: Since they do not give off much heat in comparison to incandescent lights, LED lights used for traffic control can have snow obscuring them, leading to accidents.

== See also ==
- High-CRI LED lighting – LED lighting source
- Hiroshi Amano – Japanese electrical engineer (born 1960)
- Isamu Akasaki – Japanese materials scientist (1929–2021)
- LED Strip Light – Flexible strip of surface mounted light-emitting diodes
- LED tattoo – Theoretical body modification
- List of light sources – Devices and processes that produce light
- MicroLED – Emerging flat-panel display technology
- Perovskite light-emitting diode – Postulated lighting technology
- Shuji Nakamura – Japanese–American electrical engineer (born 1954)
- Superluminescent diode – Optoelectronics component
