= Cap lamp =

Lamp worn on the head or helmet

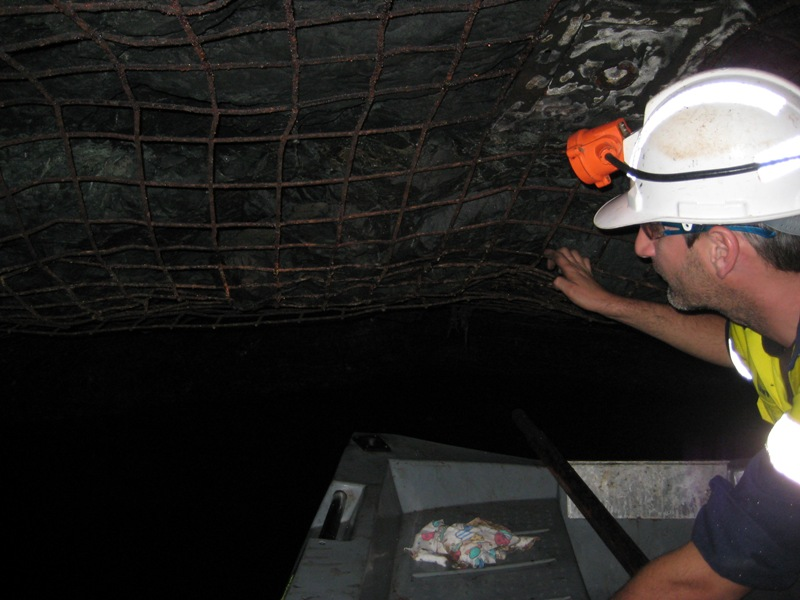
A miner wearing a hard hat with an attached cap lamp

A cap lamp is a lamp worn on the head or helmet. It is mostly used in an underground environment, like mines or during outdoor activities, e.g. climbing.

== Patent ==
A patent for a self-adjusting bracket for use with cap lamps was awarded in 1985.

== GEN 4 and GEN 5 ==
The two most recent variants of the cap lamp are the GEN 4 and GEN 5 models. The GEN 4 model, approved for use by the Mine Safety and Health Administration (MHSA), uses the headpiece of existing cap lamps, but retrofitted with new LEDs and electronics. The GEN 5 model is very similar to the GEN 4 model except with a more intense spot beam that can illuminate objects that are more than 40 feet away. Since GEN 5 is very similar to GEN 4, it has not been separately approved by MHSA. These lamps will last up to 50 hours with a six-cell battery pack. Energy-saving variants of these models, GEN 4E and GEN 5E, use a single lithium-ion battery.

These new cap lamp variants that use LEDs follows research done by the National Institute for Occupational Safety and Health in the United States, comparing LEDs to traditional incandescent light bulbs, where they found that the LEDs improved hazard detection.
