= Light extraction in LEDs =

Light extraction in LEDs involves the set of particular problems that is connected with getting light from the light emitting p-n junction in an LED to the surroundings, such that the light might be useful, for instance for lighting.

The refractive index of most LED semiconductor materials is quite high, so in almost all cases the light from the LED is coupled into a much lower-index medium. The large index difference makes the reflection quite substantial (per the Fresnel coefficients). The produced light gets partially reflected back into the semiconductor, where it may be absorbed and turned into additional heat; this is usually one of the dominant causes of LED inefficiency. Often more than half of the emitted light is reflected back at the LED-package and package-air interfaces.

The reflection is most commonly reduced by using a dome-shaped (half-sphere) package with the diode in the center so that the outgoing light rays strike the surface perpendicularly, at which angle the reflection is minimized. Substrates that are transparent to the emitted wavelength, and backed by a reflective layer, increase the LED efficiency. The refractive index of the package material should also match the index of the semiconductor, to minimize back-reflection. An anti-reflection coating may be added as well. Also, surface roughening of LEDs is one of the key strategies to increased light extraction efficiency.

The package may be colored, but this is only for cosmetic reasons or to improve the contrast ratio; the color of the packaging does not substantially affect the color of the light emitted.

Other strategies for reducing the impact of the interface reflections include designing the LED to reabsorb and reemit the reflected light (called photon recycling) and manipulating the microscopic structure of the surface to reduce the reflectance, by introducing random roughness, creating programmed moth eye surface patterns. Recently photonic crystals have also been used to minimize back-reflections. In December 2007, scientists at Glasgow University claimed to have found a way to make LEDs more energy efficient, imprinting billions of holes into LEDs using a process known as nanoimprint lithography.
