= Perovskite light-emitting diode =

Postulated lighting technology

Perovskite light-emitting diodes (PeLEDs) are candidates for display and lighting technologies. Researchers have shown interest in perovskite light-emitting diodes (PeLEDs) owing to their capacity for emitting light with narrow bandwidth, adjustable spectrum, ability to deliver high color purity, and solution fabrication.

== Green PeLEDs ==
PeLEDs have not surpassed the efficiency of commercial organic light-emitting diodes (OLEDs) because specific critical parameters, such as charge carrier transport and optical output coupling efficiency, have not been optimized.

The development of efficient green PeLEDs with an external quantum efficiency (EQE) exceeding 30% was reported by Bai and his colleagues on May 29, 2023. This achievement was made by adjustments in charge carrier transport and the distribution of near-field light. These optimizations resulted in a light output coupling efficiency of 41.82%.

The modified structure of green PeLED achieved record external quantum efficiency of 30.84% at a brightness level of 6514 cd/m^{2}. This work introduced an approach to building ultra-efficient PeLEDs by balancing electron-hole recombination and enhancing light outcoupling.

Expanding the effective area of perovskite LEDs can decrease their performance. Sun et al. introduced L-methionine (NVAL) to construct an intermediate phase with low formation enthalpy and COO^{−} coordination. This new intermediate phase altered the crystallization pathway, effectively inhibiting phase segregation. Consequently, high-quality large-area quasi-2D perovskite films were achieved. They further fine-tuned the film's composite dynamics, leading to high-efficiency quasi-2D perovskite green LEDs with an effective area of 9.0 cm^{2}. An external quantum efficiency (EQE) of 16.4% was attained at <n> = 3, making it the most efficient large-area perovskite LED. Moreover, a luminance of 9.1×104 cd/m^{2} was achieved in the <n> = 10 films.

== Blue PeLEDs ==
On March 16, 2023, Zhou et al. published a study demonstrating their successful control of ion behavior to create highly efficient sky-blue perovskite light-emitting diodes. They achieved this by utilizing a bifunctional passivator, which consisted of Lewis base benzoic acid anions and alkali metal cations. This passivator had a dual role: it effectively passivated the deficient lead atom while inhibited the migration of halide ions. The outcome of this innovative approach was the realization of an efficient perovskite LED that emitted light at a stable wavelength of 483 nm. The LED exhibited a commendable external quantum efficiency (EQE) of 16.58%, with a peak EQE reaching 18.65%. Through optical coupling enhancement, the EQE was further boosted to 28.82%.

== Red PeLEDs ==
One of the most crucial aspects of lighting and display technology is the efficient generation of red emission. Quasi-2D perovskites have demonstrated potential for high emission efficiency due to robust carrier confinement. However, the external quantum efficiencies (EQE) of most red quasi-2D PeLEDs are not optimal due to different n-value phases within complex quasi-2D perovskite films.

To address this challenge, Jiang et al. published their findings in Advanced Materials on July 20, 2022. Their research focused on strategically incorporating large cations to enhance the efficiency of red light perovskite LEDs. By introducing phenethylammonium iodide (PEAI)/3-fluorophenylethylammonium iodide (m-F-PEA) and 1-naphthylmethylammonium iodide (NMAI), they achieved precise control over the phase distribution of quasi-2D perovskite materials. This approach effectively reduced the prevalence of smaller n-index phases and concurrently addressed lead and halide defects in the perovskite films. The outcome of this research was the development of perovskite LEDs capable of achieving an EQE of 25.8% at 680 nm, accompanied by a peak brightness of 1300 cd/m^{2}.

== White PeLEDs ==
High-performance white perovskite LED with high light extraction efficiency can be constructed through near-field optical coupling. The near-field optical coupling between blue perovskite diode and red perovskite nanocrystal was achieved by a reasonably designed multi-layer translucent electrode (LiF/Al/Ag/LiF). The red perovskite nano-crystalline layer allows the waveguide mode and surface plasmon polarization mode captured in the blue perovskite diode to be extracted and converted into red light emission, increasing the light extraction efficiency by 50%. At the same time, the complementary emission spectra of blue photons and down-converted red photons contribute to the formation of white LEDs. Finally, the off-device quantum efficiency exceeds 12%, and the brightness exceeds 2000 cd/m^{2}, which are both the highest in white PeLEDs.

== Lifetime ==
Preparing high-quality all-inorganic perovskite films through solution-based methods remains a formidable challenge, primarily attributed to the rapid and uncontrollable crystallization of such materials. The key innovation involved controlling the crystal orientation of the all-inorganic perovskite along the (110) plane through a low-temperature annealing process (35-40 °C). This precise control led to the orderly stacking of crystals, which significantly increased surface coverage and reduced defects within the material. After thorough optimization, the well-oriented CsPbBr_{3} perovskite LED achieved an external quantum efficiency (EQE) of up to 16.45%, a remarkable brightness of 79,932 cd/m^{2}, and a lifespan of 136 hours when initially operated at a brightness level of 100 cd/m^{2}.

On September 20, 2021, the team led by Sargent et al. from the University of Toronto published their research findings in the Journal of the American Chemical Society (JACS) on bright and stable light-emitting diodes (LEDs) based on perovskite quantum dots within a perovskite matrix. The research reported that perovskite quantum dots remain stable in a precursor solution thin film of perovskite and drive the uniform crystallization of the perovskite matrix using strain quantum dots as nucleation centers. The type I band alignment ensures that quantum dots act as charge acceptors and radiative emitters.

The new material exhibits suppressed biexciton Auger recombination and bright luminescence even at high excitation (600 W/cm^{2}). The red LEDs based on the new material demonstrate an external quantum efficiency of 18% and maintain high performance at a brightness exceeding 4700 cd/m^{2}. The new material extends the LED's operating half-life to 2400 hours at an initial brightness of 100 cd/m^{2}.

== Advancements on Near-Infrared PeLEDs ==
To address the issue of phosphor converted LEDs ability to emit ultrabroad near infrared (NIR) radiations. Researchers currently have used PeLED by using 2.5% W4+-doped and 2.8% Mo4+-doped Cs2Na0.95Ag0.05BiCl6. Thus, producing perovskites emitting ultrabroad NIR radiation with spectral widths of 434 and 468 nm. This brings a lot of promise to the emerging field of using PeLEDs. The perovskite market is still blooming; current work is being done for scaling up the manufacturing process. The current prediction is that the global perovskite market will actually be able to exceed $10 billion by 2035. The Ultrabroad Near Infrared Emitting PeLEDs also are integrated with biodegradable polymer polylactic acid for more versatility in applications.

There is current work in improving NIR LEDs to be more optimal for biomedical imaging and sensing by doping in all-inorganic tin perovskites (CsSnI3). By incorporating perovskites researchers have been able to achieve higher radiance and longer operational stability. These improvements are a result of manipulating p-doping with a focus of controlling crystallization in the material. These advancements not only bring promise to the medical field but also to energy sources and the utilization of peLEDs for energy purposes as well as perovskite solar cells.

== Commercialization Challenges of PeLEDs ==
PeLEDs bring great promise in many large scale applications. PeLEDs have an advantage in commercialization since their raw material cost is lower than ILEDs and OLEDs. When it comes to manufacturing costs there is a consideration of deposition of the functional layer and coating methods. Researchers suggest that incorporating wet processing has the potential to improve production efficiency helping reduce the cost of making PeLEDS.

Certain issues arise in the upscaling and commercialization of PeLEDS such challenges are the degradation of perovskite, producing a lead-free PeLED and the efficiency of the blue PeLED. Due to perovskites poor thermal stability and degradation induced by other environmental factors such as vapor, oxygen light; the lifetime can vary and be shorter compared to other PeLEDs. The concerns on producing lead-free PeLEDs is brought upon by the fact that they have low Photoluminescence quantum yield (PLQY). The inefficacy of producing blue PeLEDs is attributed to halogen ion migration that occurs in perovskites. This halogen ion migration results in phase segregation under voltage bias. The phase segregation causes the blue PeLED to fail and rapidly shift the wavelength from blue to green. There are other approaches that have been implemented to address this issues but a lot of limitations are still present.
