= Distributed Bragg reflector =

Structure used in waveguides

Time-resolved simulation of a pulse reflecting from a Bragg mirror.

A distributed Bragg reflector (DBR) is a reflector used in waveguides, such as optical fibers. It is a structure formed from multiple layers of alternating materials with different refractive index, or by periodic variation of some characteristic (such as height) of a dielectric waveguide, resulting in periodic variation in the effective refractive index in the guide. Each layer boundary causes a partial reflection and refraction of an optical wave. For waves whose vacuum wavelength is close to four times the optical thickness of the layers, the interaction between these beams generates constructive interference, and the layers act as a high-quality reflector. The range of wavelengths that are reflected is called the photonic stopband. Within this range of wavelengths, light is "forbidden" to propagate in the structure.

== Reflectivity ==
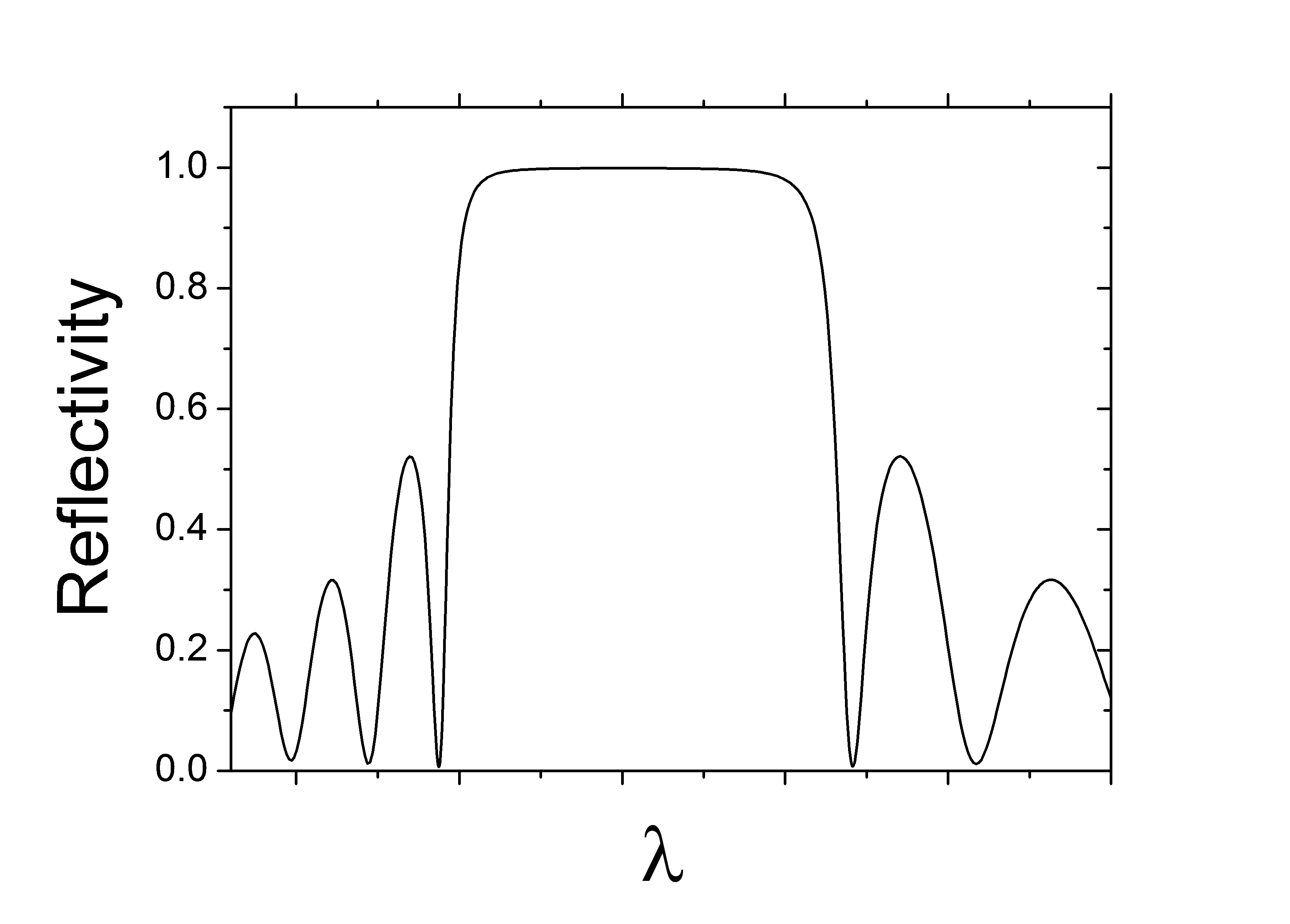
Calculated reflectivity of a schematic DBR structure

The DBR's reflectivity, $R$, for intensity is approximately given by

$$R = \left[\frac{n_o (n_2)^{2N} - n_s(n_1)^{2N}}{n_o (n_2)^{2N} + n_s (n_1)^{2N}}\right]^2,$$

where $n_o,\ n_1,\ n_2$ and $n_s\,$ are the respective refractive indices of the originating medium, the two alternating materials, and the terminating medium (i.e. backing or substrate); and $N$ is the number of repeated pairs of low/high refractive index material. This formula assumes the repeated pairs all have a quarter-wave thickness (that is $n d = \lambda / 4$, where $n$ is the refractive index of the layer, $d$ is the thickness of the layer, and $\lambda$ is the wavelength of the light).

The frequency bandwidth $\Delta f_0$ of the photonic stop-band can be calculated by

$$\frac{\Delta f_0}{f_0} = \frac{4}{\pi}\arcsin\left(\frac{n_2 - n_1}{n_2 + n_1}\right),$$

where $f_o$ is the central frequency of the band. This configuration gives the largest possible ratio $\frac{\Delta f_0}{f_0}$ that can be achieved with these two values of the refractive index.

Increasing the number of pairs in a DBR increases the mirror reflectivity and increasing the refractive index contrast between the materials in the Bragg pairs increases both the reflectivity and the bandwidth. A common choice of materials for the stack is titanium dioxide (n ≈ 2.5) and silica (n ≈ 1.5). Substituting into the formula above gives a bandwidth of about 200 nm for 630 nm light.

Distributed Bragg reflectors are critical components in vertical cavity surface emitting lasers and other types of narrow-linewidth laser diodes such as distributed feedback (DFB) lasers and distributed bragg reflector (DBR) lasers. They are also used to form the cavity resonator (or optical cavity) in fiber lasers and free electron lasers.

=== TE and TM mode reflectivity ===
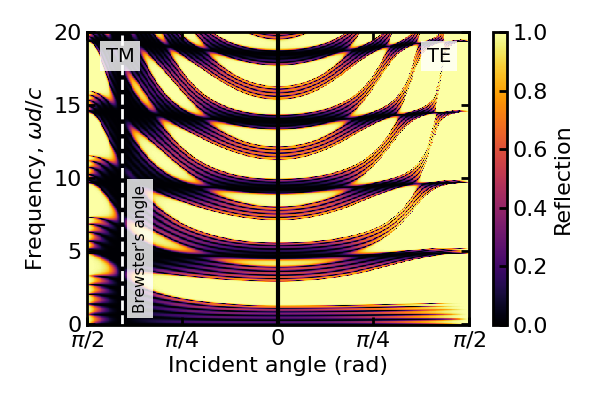
Total reflection map as function of incident angle and dimensionless frequency. Parameters of the systems: ε = (11.4, 1.0), period of one layer is d = 0.2 + 0.8 = 1, total number of periods is 6. Left half represents TM reflection with a Brewster's angle showed as a white dashed line, right half represents TE reflection.

This section discusses the interaction of transverse electric (TE) and transverse magnetic (TM) polarized light with the DBR structure, over several wavelengths and incidence angles. This reflectivity of the DBR structure (described below) was calculated using the transfer-matrix method (TMM), where the TE mode alone is highly reflected by this stack, while the TM modes are passed through. This also shows the DBR acting as a polarizer.

For TE and TM incidence we have the reflection spectra of a DBR stack, corresponding to a 6 layer stack of dielectric contrast of 11.5, between an air and dielectric layers. The thicknesses of the air and dielectric layers are 0.8 and 0.2 of the period, respectively. The wavelength in the figures below, corresponds to multiples of the cell period.

This DBR is also a simple example of a 1D photonic crystal. It has a complete TE band gap, but only a pseudo TM band gap.

== Bio-inspired Bragg reflectors ==
Example of color change in Bragg reflector with change in humidity and comparison to biological structure.

Bio-inspired Bragg reflectors are 1D photonic crystals inspired by nature. Reflection of light from such a nanostructured matter results in structural colouration. When designed from mesoporous metal-oxides or polymers, these devices can be used as low-cost vapor/solvents sensors. For example, colour of this porous multi-layered structures will change when the matter filling up the pores is replaced by another, e.g., replacing air with water.

== See also ==
- Bragg's law – Scattering from arrays of atoms
- Bragg diffraction – Scattering from arrays of atoms
- Diffraction – Interference phenomenon of waves
  - Diffraction grating – Optical component which splits light into several beams
- Dielectric mirror – Mirror made of dielectric materials
- Fabry–Pérot interferometer – Optical device with parallel mirrors
- Fiber Bragg grating – Type of distributed Bragg reflector constructed in a short segment of optical fiber
- Photonic-crystal fiber – Class of optical fiber based on the properties of photonic crystals
- Vertical-cavity surface-emitting laser – Type of semiconductor laser diode
- Photonic crystal sensor
