= List of LED failure modes =

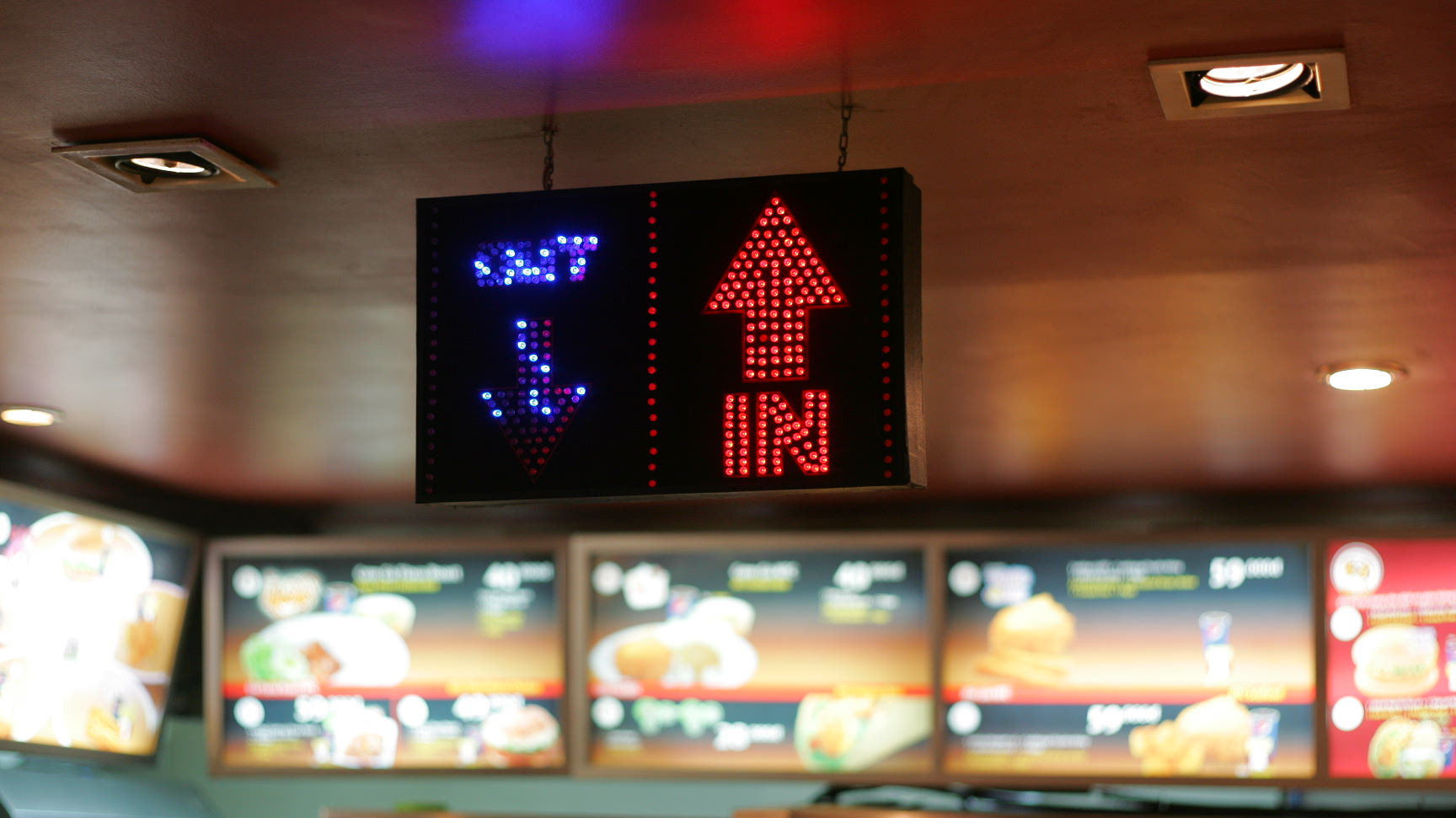
Failed blue LEDs

The most common way for LEDs (and diode lasers) to fail is the gradual lowering of light output and loss of efficiency. Sudden failures, however rare, can occur as well. Early red LEDs were notable for their short lifetime.

== Packaging-related ==
- Epoxy degradation: Some materials of the plastic package tend to yellow when subjected to heat, causing partial absorption (and therefore loss of efficiency) of the affected wavelengths.
- Thermal stress: Sudden failures are most often caused by thermal stresses. When the epoxy resin package reaches its glass transition temperature, it starts rapidly expanding, causing mechanical stresses on the semiconductor and the bonded contact, weakening it or even tearing it off. Conversely, very low temperatures can cause cracking of the packaging.
- Differentiated phosphor degeneration: The different phosphors used in white LEDs tend to degrade with heat and age, but at different rates causing changes in the produced light color, for example, purple and pink LEDs often use an organic phosphor formulation which may degrade after just a few hours of operation causing a major shift in output color.

== Semiconductor and metal related ==
- Nucleation and growth of dislocations: This is a known mechanism for degradation of the active region, where the radiative recombination occurs. It requires a presence of an existing defect in the crystal and is accelerated by heat, high current density, and emitted light. Gallium arsenide and aluminium gallium arsenide are more susceptible to this mechanism than gallium arsenide phosphide and indium phosphide. Due to different properties of the active regions, gallium nitride and indium gallium nitride are virtually insensitive to this kind of defect.
- Electromigration: This is caused by high current density and can move atoms out of the active regions, leading to emergence of dislocations and point defects, acting as nonradiative recombination centers and producing heat instead of light.
- Ionizing radiation: It can lead to the creation of defects, which leads to issues with radiation hardening of circuits containing LEDs (e.g., in optoisolators)
- Metal diffusion: Caused by high electrical currents or voltages at elevated temperatures, metal diffusion can move metal atoms from the electrodes into the active region. Some materials, notably indium tin oxide and silver, are subject to electromigration which causes leakage current and non-radiative recombination along the chip edges. In some cases, especially with GaN/InGaN diodes, a barrier metal layer is used to hinder the electromigration effects.
- Short circuits: Mechanical stresses, high currents, and a corrosive environment can lead to formation of whiskers, causing short circuits.
- Sidewall Defects: Despite advancements in fabrication, the characterization of microLEDs remains highly challenging due to their miniature size. In particular, sidewall defects significantly impact optical and electrical properties, yet are difficult to detect and analyze.

== Stress-related ==
- Thermal runaway: Non-homogeneities in the substrate, causing localized loss of thermal conductivity, can cause thermal runaway where heat causes damage which causes more heat etc. Most common ones are voids caused by incomplete soldering, or by electromigration effects and Kirkendall voiding.
- Current crowding: A non-homogeneous distribution of the current density over the junction can lead to the formation of current filaments. This may lead to creation of localized hot spots, which poses risk of thermal runaway.
- Electrostatic discharge: An ESD may cause immediate failure of the semiconductor junction, a permanent shift of its parameters, or latent damage causing increased rate of degradation. LEDs and lasers grown on sapphire substrate (see silicon on sapphire) are more susceptible to ESD damage.
- Reverse bias: Although the LED is based on a diode junction and is nominally a rectifier, the reverse-breakdown mode for some types can occur at very low voltages and essentially any excess reverse bias can cause immediate degradation, and may lead to vastly accelerated failure. 5 V is a typical maximum reverse bias voltage specification for ordinary LEDs; some special types may have lower limits.
- Catastrophic optical damage: Can occur in high power semiconductor lasers.
