= Rui Yang =

Rui Yang from the University of Oklahoma, Norman, Oklahoma, was named Fellow of the Institute of Electrical and Electronics Engineers (IEEE) in 2014 for contributions to the mid-infrared interband cascade laser and related optoelectronic devices.
