= Frédéric Grillot =

French physicist and professor

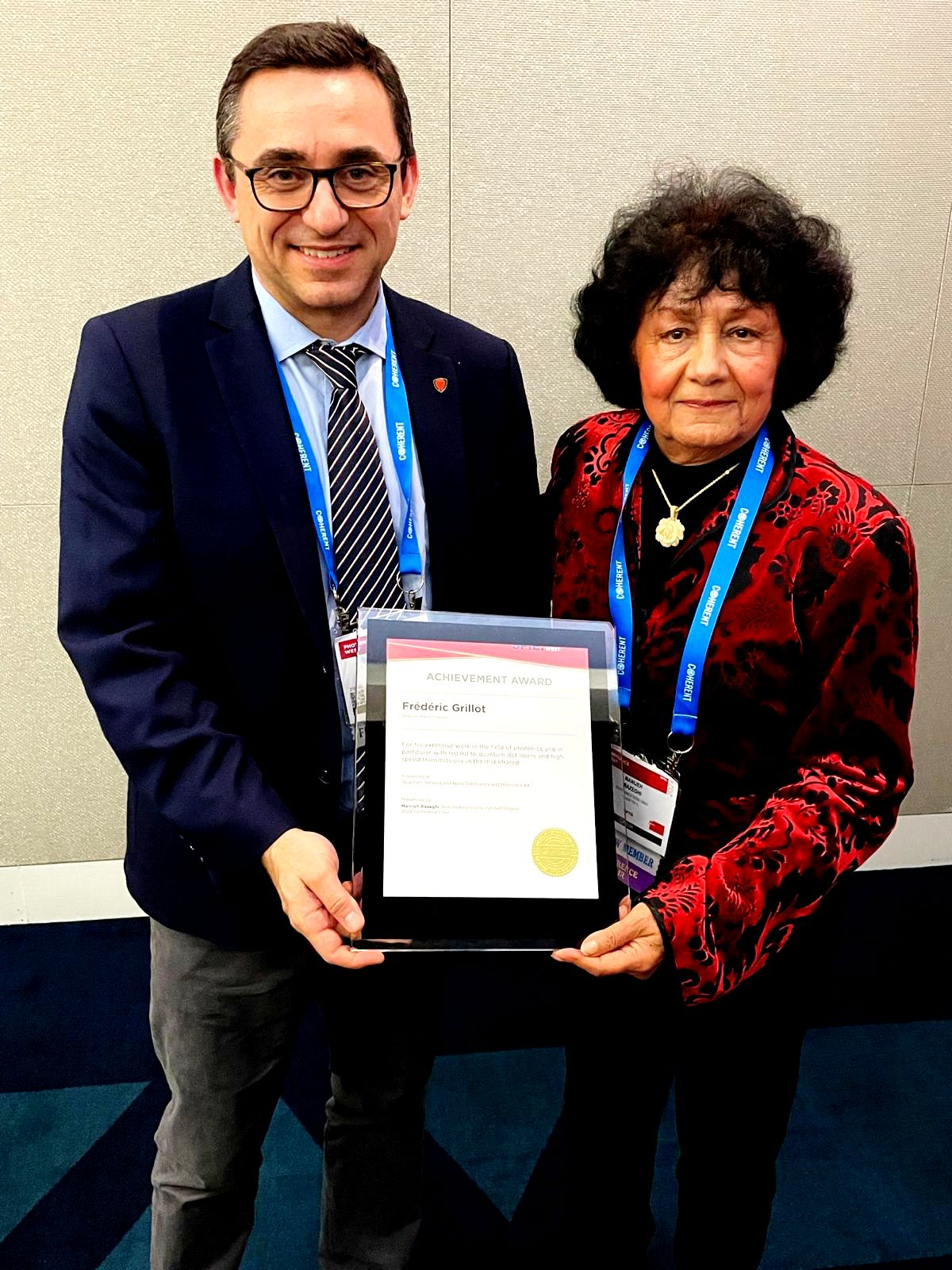
- Frédéric Grillot and Manijeh Razeghi
- Born: 22 August 1974 (age 52)
- Scientific career
- Fields: Physics, Photonics, Optoelectronics
- Workplaces: Université Laval; Télécom Paris

Frédéric Grillot (English: /ɡriːˈjoʊ/, French: [fʁedeʁik ɡʁijo]) is a French physicist and professor whose academic work is in the fields of optoelectronics and photonics, with a focus on semiconductor lasers and quantum optical technologies. As of 2025, he holds a professorship at Université Laval in Quebec, Canada and serves as a Research Affiliate at the University of California Santa Barbara. His work includes studies on quantum dot laser, nonlinear optics, photonic chaos encryption, and optical communications including mid-infrared free-space transmission using quantum cascade technology (lasers, modulators, and detectors) near room temperature.

== Education ==
Grillot earned his Ph.D. in electrical engineering from the Université de Franche-Comté in France. He began his academic career as an assistant professor at INSA Rennes (2004–2012), then joined Télécom Paris, where he served as associate professor and later as full professor. Between 2015 and 2024, he was also a research professor at the University of New Mexico.

== Research ==
Grillot’s research has contributed to developments in mid-infrared (MIR) optoelectronics, particularly high-speed laser sources operating at room temperature within the 4–12 μm atmospheric transmission window. These devices are used in free-space optical communication, defense, aerospace, and environmental sensing. Recent developments from his group have enabled data transmission at multi-gigabit-per-second rates, supported by interband cascade lasers technology. His research group has also demonstrated physical-layer encryption in the MIR region using chaotic quantum cascade lasers, enabling secure data transmission without conventional encryption protocols. Grillot has also made notable contributions to the development of quantum dot lasers, including work on low-noise, narrow-linewidth sources for coherent optical communications, and the generation of broadband optical frequency combs through nonlinear effects in quantum dot gain media. He has also contributed to the integration of quantum dot lasers on silicon photonic platforms, and has been involved in recent studies reporting photon number squeezing from QD lasers operating at room temperature.

In 2023, Grillot received the Ampère Medal from the Société de l'Électricité, de l'Électronique et des Technologies de l'Information et de la Communication (SEE). In 2022, he was named IEEE Photonics Society Distinguished Lecturer. In 2021, he received the IEEE Photonics Technology Letters Best Paper Award for a publication on reflection-insensitive quantum dot lasers grown on silicon. He was elected Fellow of SPIE in 2019 for contributions to optoelectronics and quantum dot laser development. More recently, he was made Fellow of Optica for his pioneering work on mid infrared optoelectronics and quantum dot lasers for silicon photonics.

Since May 2021, he has served as deputy editor of Optics Express, an open-access journal published by Optica, following seven years as associate editor. In 2025, he was elected to the board of governors of the IEEE Photonics Society.
