= Robert N. Hall =

American engineer and applied physicist

- Born: December 25, 1919; New Haven, Connecticut, U.S.
- Died: November 7, 2016 (aged 96)
- Education: California Institute of Technology
- Known for: Demonstration of the first semiconductor laser; Invention of a magnetron; Shockley–Read–Hall recombination
- Awards: Marconi Prize (1989); National Inventors Hall of Fame (1994)
- Scientific career
- Fields: engineering, applied physics
- Workplaces: General Electric
- Thesis: (1950)
- Doctoral advisor: Charles Christian Lauritsen
- Other academic advisors: William Alfred Fowler

Robert Noel Hall (December 25, 1919 – November 7, 2016) was an American engineer and applied physicist. He demonstrated the first semiconductor laser and invented a type of magnetron commonly used in microwave ovens. He also contributed to the development of rectifiers for power transmission.

== Early life ==
Robert N. Hall was born on December 25, 1919, in New Haven, Connecticut. He was first inspired by his inventor uncle, who showed him the wonders of small inventions and experimentation. After long studies at his local library, Hall decided to attempt controlled experiments of his own with his mother's approval. He built an 8-inch telescope, which produced a close-up view of Saturn.

Later on, an interviewer from the California Institute of Technology visited him and offered a scholarship to attend the university. Hall studied there for three years but had to leave for financial reasons. After working at Lockheed Aircraft as a tester, he returned to Caltech to finish up his studies and obtain his physics degree.

== Career ==
General Electric hired Hall as a test engineer at Schenectady, New York. After four years at General Electric, under the advice of Harper North, Hall obtained a Research Council Fellowship and returned to Caltech. He graduated in 1948 with his Ph.D. and returned to General Electric. Schenectady research labs that summer.

While at General Electric during World War II, he developed a magnetron for radar jamming, which led to the development of the microwave oven. While studying the characteristics of p-i-n diodes used as power rectifiers, Hall had a key insight, which resulted in his being co-credited with William Shockley and W. T. Read, Jr., for the analysis of nonradiative carrier recombination in semiconductors. Hall developed the first semiconductor laser diode in 1962, while working at General Electric in Schenectady, New York. In the 1970s, Hall's work focused on photovoltaics and solar cells. He retired in 1987, having been granted 43 U.S. patents during his career.

Hall was elected to the National Academy of Engineering in 1977 and to the National Academy of Sciences in 1978. He was inducted into the National Inventors Hall of Fame in 1994.

== Personal life ==
Robert was a Methodist. He died on November 7, 2016, at the age of 96.
