= Distributed Bragg reflector laser =

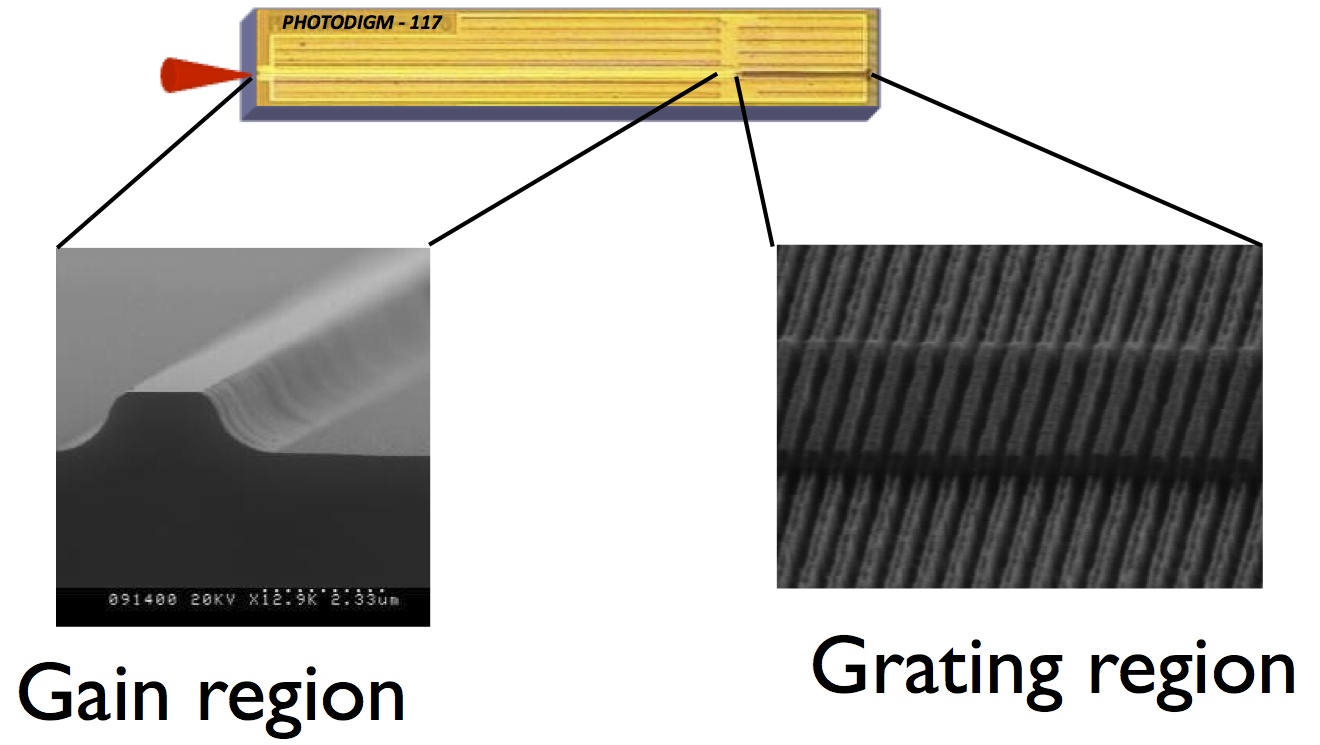
Photomicrographs of a DBR laser

A distributed Bragg reflector laser (DBR) is a type of single frequency laser diode. Other practical types of single frequency laser diodes include DFB lasers and external cavity diode lasers. A fourth type, the cleaved-coupled-cavity laser has not proven to be commercially viable. VCSELs are also single frequency devices. The DBR laser structure is fabricated with surface features that define a monolithic, single mode ridge waveguide that runs the entire length of the device. A resonant cavity is defined by a highly reflective DBR mirror on one end, and a low reflectivity cleaved exit facet on the other end. Within the cavity is a gain ridge portion, where current is injected to produce a single spatial lasing mode. The DBR mirror is designed to reflect only a single longitudinal mode. As a result, the laser operates on a single spatial and longitudinal mode. The laser emits from the exit facet opposite the DBR end. The DBR is continuously tunable over approximately a 2 nm range by changing current or temperature. The temperature coefficient is approximately 0.07 nm/K, and the current coefficient is approximately 0.003 nm/mA. DBR lasers are stable, low noise optical sources. When operated with a low noise power supply at constant temperature, edge emitting DBR lasers have a linewidth of less than 10 MHz. Power levels typically can run up to several hundred milliwatts.

DBR lasers are often confused with DFB lasers. Both exhibit narrow linewidth and stable single frequency operation. However, the location of the feedback element (the grating) causes the DBR and the DFB to have distinct operational characteristics. Because the grating is distributed all along the gain region in the DFB, the grating and gain region experience similar conditions as the device is tuned with current and temperature. The DFB can exhibit a continuous tuning range of 2 nm or more. However, over a sufficiently long current or temperature range, the emitted wavelength will suddenly jump to a longer wavelength (red shift), leaving a gap in the tuning range.

Because the DBR laser has a passive grating region, its tuning characteristic is different from that of the gain region. Increasing current in the gain region causes a red shift in laser output due to heating. The reflectivity curve of the passive grating does not change. As a result, the grating will experience loss of reflectivity at the longer wavelengths, and eventually will induce a discontinuous blue shift in the wavelength to find a higher gain mode. The blue shift ensures that the wavelength characteristic will repeat itself with increasing temperature or current, and no gaps will occur in the tuning.
