= Photonic crystal sensor =

Kind of nanostructure

Photonic crystal sensors use photonic crystals: nanostructures composed of periodic arrangements of dielectric materials that interact with light depending on their particular structure, reflecting lights of specific wavelengths at specific angles. Any change in the periodicity or refractive index of the structure can give rise to a change in the reflected color, or the color perceived by the observer or a spectrometer. That simple principle makes them useful colorimetric intuitive sensors for different applications including, but not limited to, environmental analysis, temperature sensing, magnetic sensing, biosensing, diagnostics, food quality control, security, and mechanical sensing. Many animals in nature such as fish or beetles employ responsive photonic crystals for camouflage, signaling or to bait their prey. The variety of materials utilizable in such structures ranging from inorganic, organic as well as plasmonic metal nanoparticles makes these structures highly customizable and versatile. In the case of inorganic materials, variation of the refractive index is the most commonly exploited effect in sensing, while periodicity change is more commonly exhibited in polymer-based sensors. Besides their small size, current developments in manufacturing technologies have made them easy and cheap to fabricate on a larger scale, making them mass-producible and practical.

== Types and structures ==
=== Biosensors and integrated lab-on-a-chip ===
Photonic crystals exhibit high sensitivity, selectivity, stability, and electricity-free operation if needed. They have become highly researched portable biological sensors. Developments in analysis, device miniaturization, fluidic design and integration have led to the development of integrated photonic crystal sensors in lab-on-a-chip devices of high sensitivity, a low limit of detection, a faster response time and low cost. A large range of analytes of biological interest such as proteins, DNA, cancer cells, glucose and antibodies can be detected with this kind of sensors, providing fast, low-priced and accurate diagnostic and health-monitoring tools that can detect concentrations as low as 15 nM. Certain chemical or biological target molecules can be integrated within the structure to provide specificity.

=== Chemical sensors ===
As chemical analytes have their own specific refractive indices, they can fill porous photonic structures, altering their effective index and consequently their color in a finger-print like manner. On the other hand, they can alter the volume of polymer-based structures, resulting in a change in the periodicity leading to a similar end effect. In ion-containing hydrogels, their selective swelling results in their specificity. Applications in gaseous and aqueous environment have been studied to detect concentrations of chemical species, solvents, vapors, ions, pH and humidity. The specificity and sensitivity can be controlled by the appropriate choice of materials and their interaction with the analytes, that can achieve even label-free sensors. The concentration of chemical species in vapor or liquid phases as well as in more complex mixtures can be determined with high confidence.

=== Mechanical sensors ===
Different mechanical signals such as pressure, strain, torsion and bending can be detected with photonic crystal sensors. Commonly, they are based on the deformation-induced change in the lattice constants in flexible materials such as elastomeric composites or colloidal crystals, causing a mechano-chromic effect as they stretch or contract.

=== 3D photonic crystals ===
Synthetic opals are three dimensional photonic crystals usually made of self-assembled nanospheres of diameters on the order of hundreds of nanometers, where the high refractive index material is that of the spheres and the low-index material is air or another filler. On the other hand, inverse opals are structures where the interstitial space between the spheres is filled with another material and the spheres are consequently removed, providing a larger free volume for faster diffusion of chemical species.

=== Photonic crystal fibers ===
Photonic crystal fibers are a special types of optical fibers that has contain air holes distributed in specific patterns around a solid or hollow core. Due to their high sensitivity, inherent flexibility, and small diameters, they can be used in a variety of situations requiring high robustness and portability. Compared to traditional optical fibers, they are highly birefringent with tailorable dispersion, limited loss and endless single-mode propagation for a long range of wavelengths and have a very fast sensing response.

=== 2D gratings and slabs ===
One-dimensional slabs with two dimensional order cause by selective removal of material, creating a pattern of holes or grooves in an otherwise homogeneous material is a popular photonic crystal structure used in sensing.

=== Fabry-Pérot mirrors ===
Fabry-Pérot mirrors are planar photonic crystal where the periodicity is maintained only in the z-dimension. Sputtered porous inorganic sensors, spin-coated polymer sensors and self-assembled block-copolymers are a few of the commonly used planar 1D structures.
