= Laser diode =

Semiconductor laser

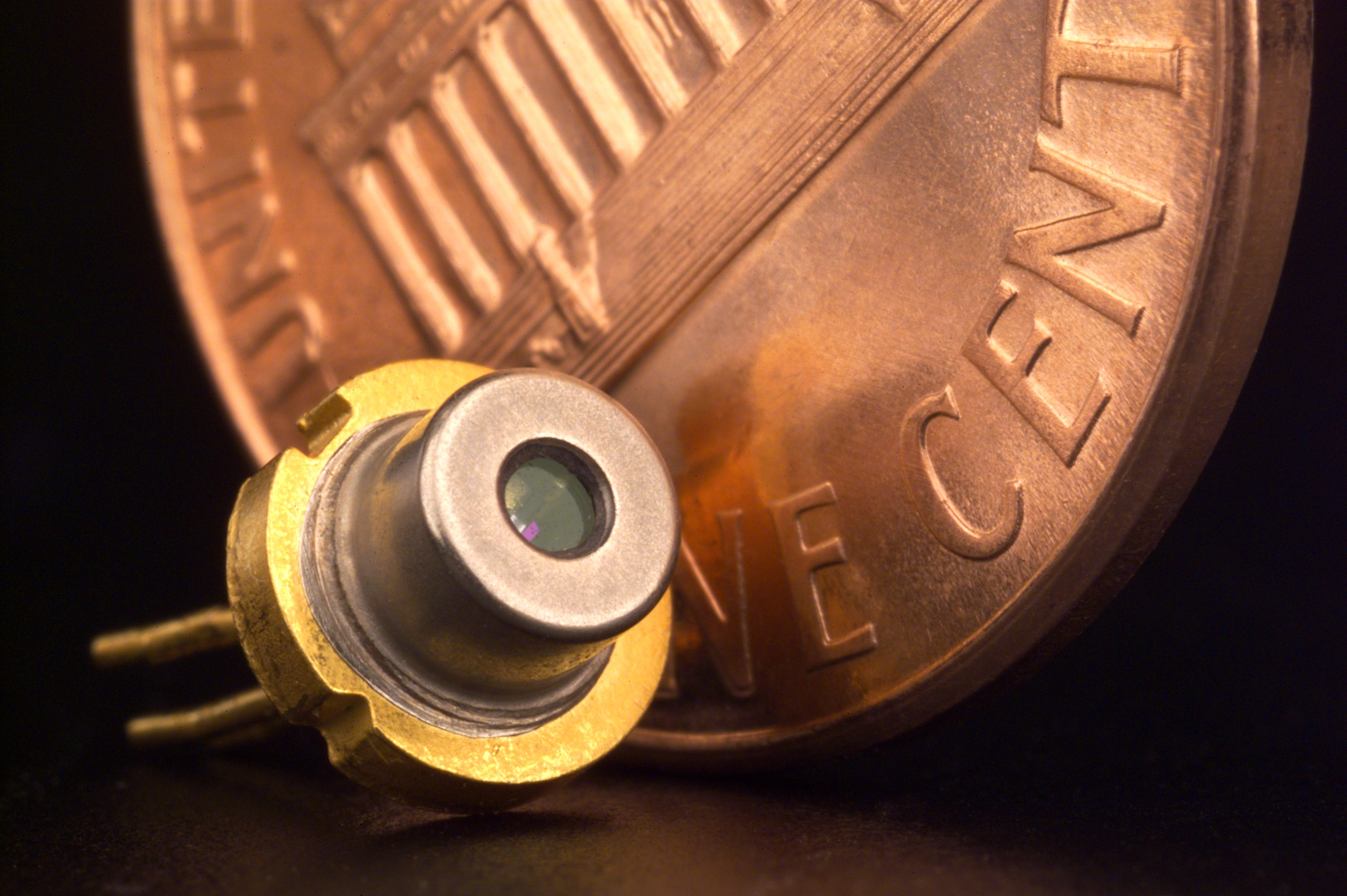
- A packaged laser diode shown with a penny for scale: a 488 nm InGaN green-blue laser, which became widely available in mid-2018.
- Component type: semiconductor, light-emitting diode
- Working principle: semiconductor, carrier generation and recombination
- Inventor: Robert N. Hall, 1962; Nick Holonyak, Jr., 1962
- Pin names: Anode and cathode

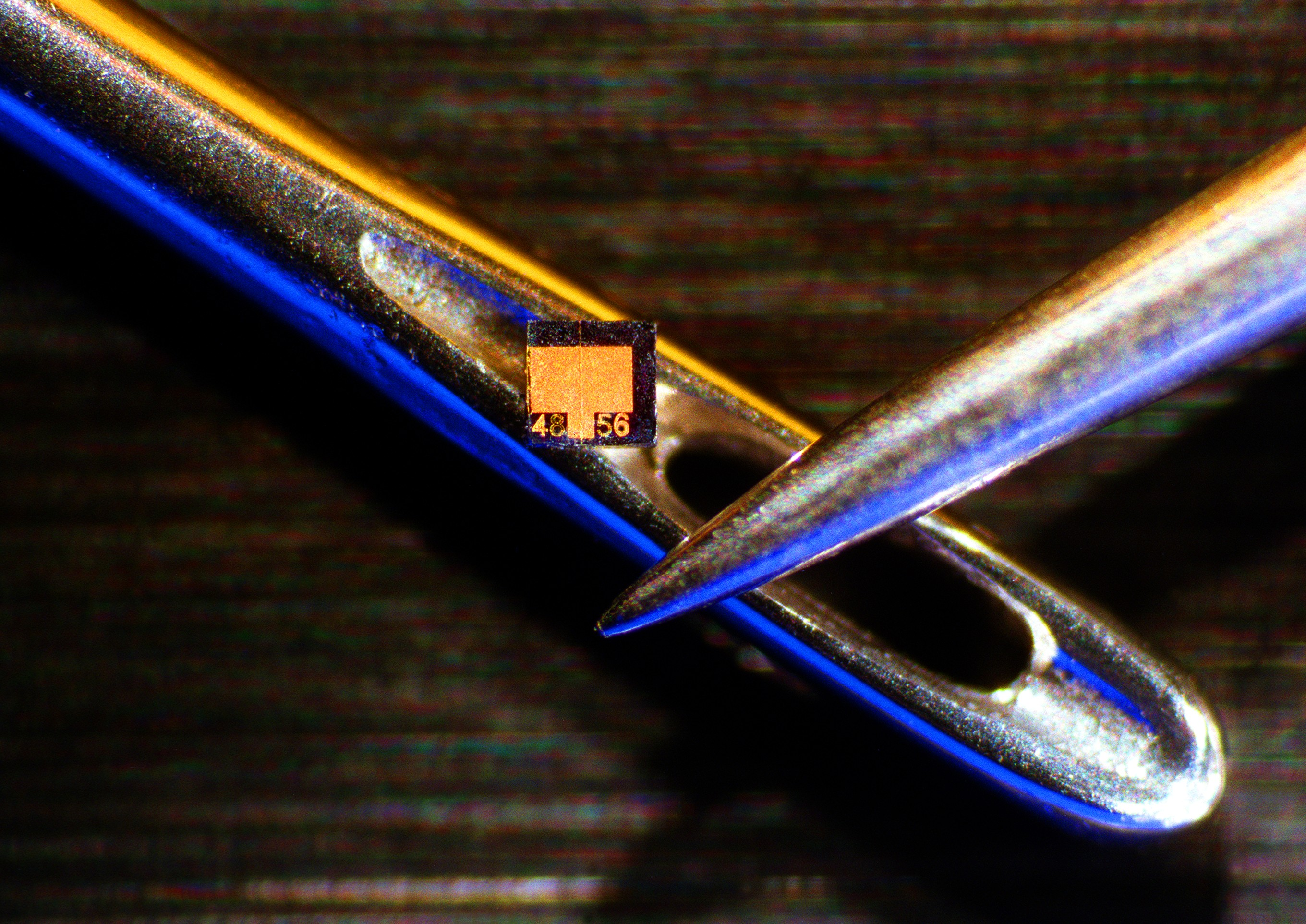
The laser diode chip removed and placed on the eye of a needle for scale

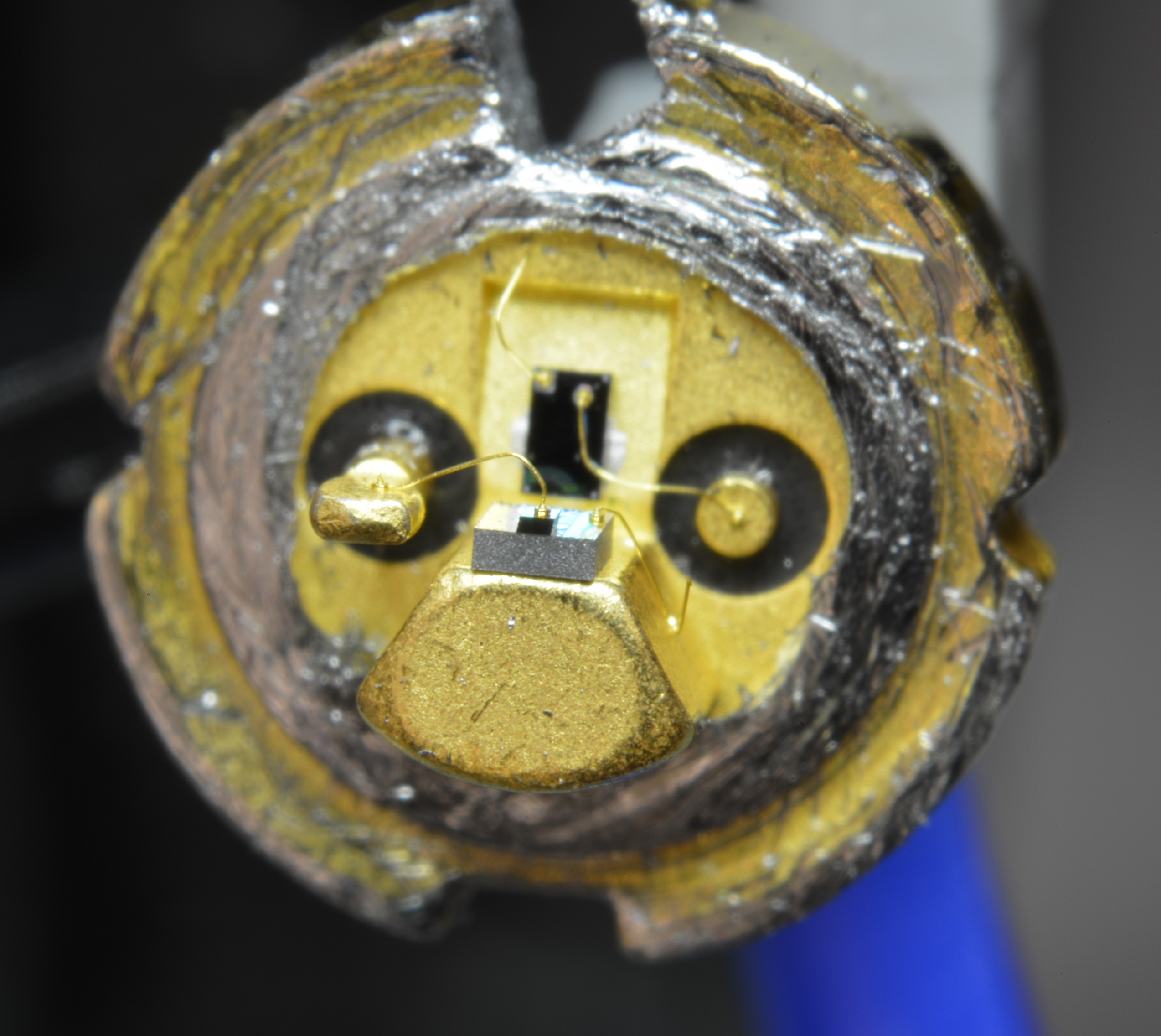
A laser diode with the case cut away. The laser diode chip is the small black chip at the front; a photodiode at the back is used to control output power.

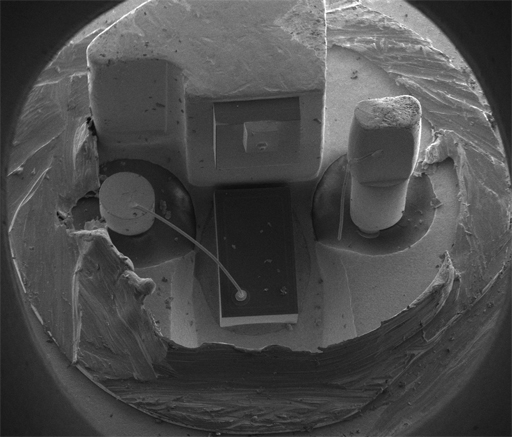
SEM (scanning electron microscope) image of a commercial laser diode with its case and window cut away. The anode connection on the left has been accidentally broken by the case cut process.

A laser diode (LD, also injection laser diode or ILD or semiconductor laser or diode laser) is a semiconductor device similar to a light-emitting diode in which a diode pumped directly with electrical current can create lasing conditions at the diode's junction.

Driven by voltage, the doped p–n-transition allows for recombination of an electron with a hole. Due to the drop of the electron from a higher energy level to a lower one, radiation is generated in the form of an emitted photon. This is spontaneous emission. Stimulated emission can be produced when the process is continued and further generates light with the same phase, coherence, and wavelength.

The choice of the semiconductor material determines the wavelength of the emitted beam, which in today's laser diodes range from the infrared (IR) to the ultraviolet (UV) spectra. Laser diodes are the most common type of lasers produced, with a wide range of uses that include fiber-optic communications, barcode readers, laser pointers, CD/DVD/Blu-ray disc reading/recording, laser printing, laser scanning, and light beam illumination. With the use of a phosphor like that found on white LEDs, laser diodes can be used for general illumination.

== Theory ==
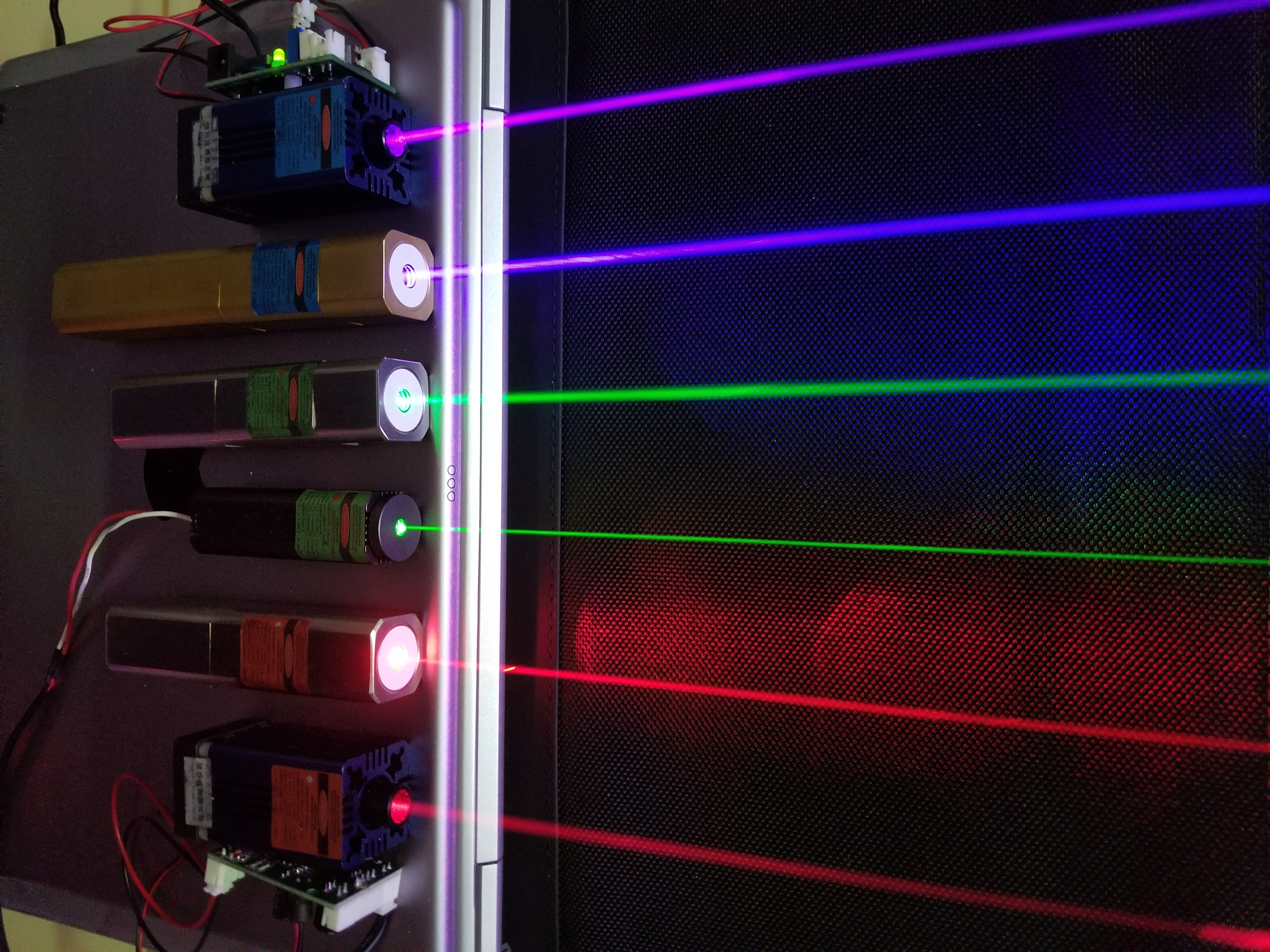
Semi-conductor lasers (Bottom to Top: 660 nm, 635 nm, 532 nm, 520 nm, 445 nm, 405 nm)

A laser diode is electrically a PIN diode. The active region of the laser diode is in the intrinsic (I) region, and the carriers (electrons and holes) are pumped into that region from the N and P regions respectively. While initial diode laser research was conducted on simple P–N diodes, all modern lasers use the double-hetero-structure implementation, where the carriers and the photons are confined in order to maximize their chances for recombination and light generation. Unlike a regular diode, the goal for a laser diode is to recombine all carriers in the I region, and produce light. Thus, laser diodes are fabricated using direct band-gap semiconductors. The laser diode epitaxial structure is grown using one of the crystal growth techniques, usually starting from an N-doped substrate, and growing the I (undoped) active layer, followed by the P-doped cladding, and a contact layer. The active layer most often consists of quantum wells, which provide lower threshold current and higher efficiency.

=== Electrical and optical pumping ===
Laser diodes form a subset of the larger classification of semiconductor p–n junction diodes. Forward electrical bias across the laser diode causes the two species of charge carrier – holes and electrons – to be injected from opposite sides of the PIN junction into the depletion region. Holes are injected from the p-doped into the undoped (i) semiconductor, and electrons vice versa. (A depletion region, devoid of any charge carriers, forms as a result of the difference in electrical potential between n- and p-type semiconductors wherever they are in physical contact.) Due to the use of charge injection in powering most diode lasers, this class of lasers is sometimes termed injection lasers, or injection laser diodes (ILD). As diode lasers are semiconductor devices, they may also be classified as semiconductor lasers. Either designation distinguishes diode lasers from solid-state lasers.

Another method of powering some diode lasers is the use of optical pumping. Optically pumped semiconductor lasers (OPSL) use a III-V semiconductor chip as the gain medium, and another laser (often another diode laser) as the pump source. OPSLs offer several advantages over ILDs, particularly in wavelength selection and lack of interference from internal electrode structures. A further advantage of OPSLs is invariance of the beam parameters – divergence, shape, and pointing – as pump power (and hence output power) is varied, even over a 10:1 output power ratio.

=== Generation of spontaneous emission ===
When an electron and a hole are present in the same region, they may recombine or annihilate producing a spontaneous emission — that is, the electron may re-occupy the energy state of the hole, emitting a photon with energy equal to the difference between the electron's original state and hole's state. (In a conventional semiconductor junction diode, the energy released from the recombination of electrons and holes is carried away as phonons (lattice vibrations) rather than as photons.) Spontaneous emission below the lasing threshold produces similar properties to an LED. Spontaneous emission is necessary to initiate laser oscillation, but it is one among several sources of inefficiency once the laser is oscillating.

=== Direct and indirect bandgap semiconductors ===
The difference between the photon-emitting semiconductor laser and a conventional phonon-emitting (non-light-emitting) semiconductor junction diode lies in the type of semiconductor used, one whose physical and atomic structure confers the possibility for photon emission. These photon-emitting semiconductors are the so-called "direct bandgap" semiconductors. The properties of silicon and germanium, which are single-element semiconductors, have bandgaps that do not align in the way needed to allow photon emission and are not considered direct. Other materials, the so-called compound semiconductors, have virtually identical crystalline structures as silicon or germanium but use alternating arrangements of two different atomic species in a checkerboard-like pattern to break the symmetry. The transition between the materials in the alternating pattern creates the critical direct bandgap property. Gallium arsenide, indium phosphide, gallium antimonide, and gallium nitride are all examples of compound semiconductor materials that can be used to create junction diodes that emit light.

Diagram of a simple laser diode, such as shown above; not to scale

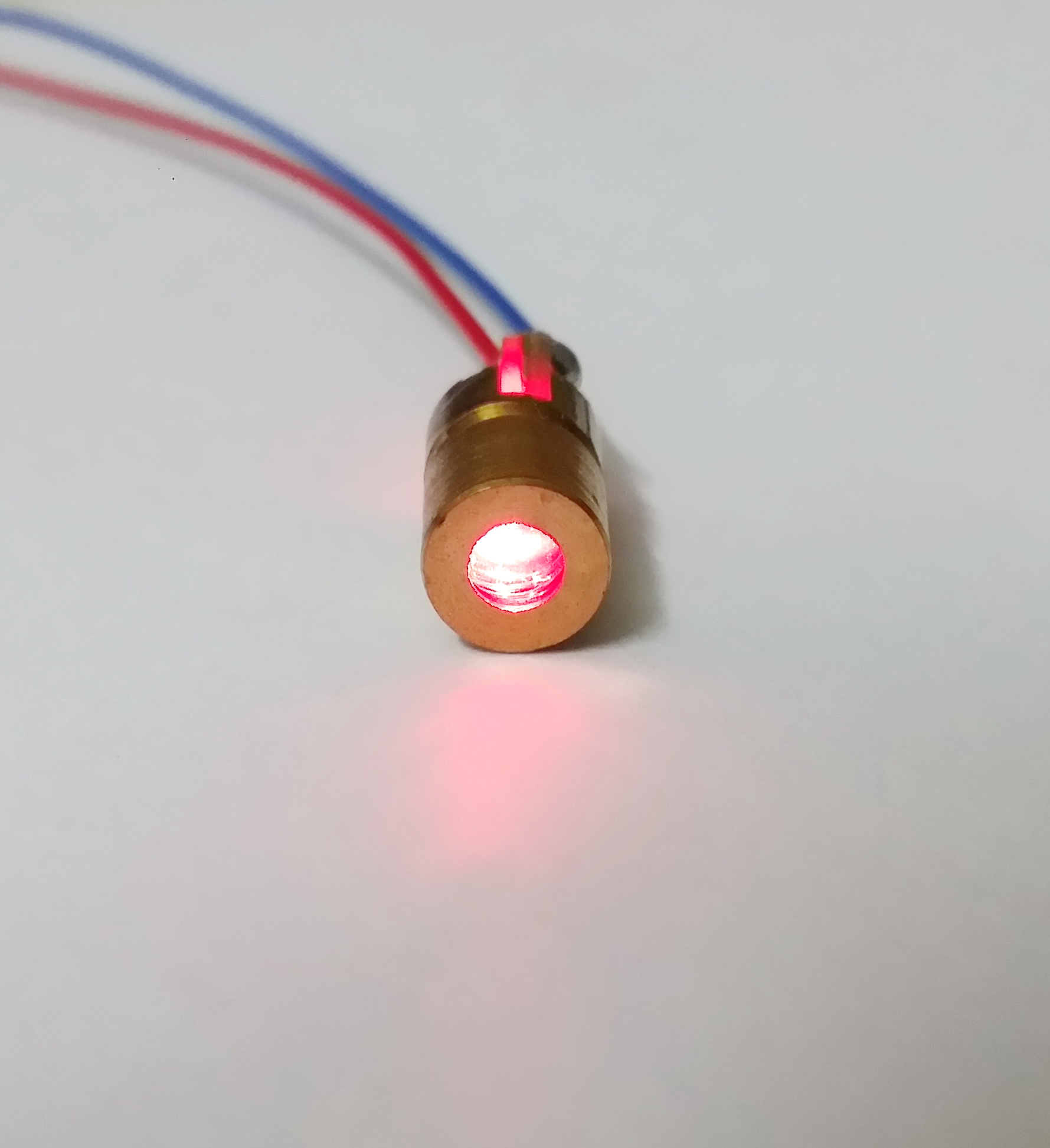
A simple and low-power metal-enclosed laser diode

=== Generation of stimulated emission ===
In the absence of stimulated emission (e.g., lasing) conditions, electrons and holes may coexist in proximity to one another, without recombining, for a certain time, termed the upper-state lifetime or recombination time (about a nanosecond for typical diode laser materials), before they recombine. A nearby photon with energy equal to the recombination energy can cause recombination by stimulated emission. This generates another photon of the same frequency, polarization, and phase, travelling in the same direction as the first photon. This means that stimulated emission will cause gain in an optical wave (of the correct wavelength) in the injection region, and the gain increases as the number of electrons and holes injected across the junction increases. The spontaneous and stimulated-emission processes are vastly more efficient in direct bandgap semiconductors than in indirect bandgap semiconductors; therefore, silicon is not a common material for laser diodes.

=== Optical cavity and laser modes ===
As in other lasers, the gain region is surrounded by an optical cavity to form a laser. In the simplest form of laser diode, an optical waveguide is made on that crystal's surface, such that the light is confined to a relatively narrow line. The two ends of the crystal are cleaved to form perfectly smooth, parallel edges, forming a Fabry–Pérot resonator. Photons emitted into a mode of the waveguide will travel along the waveguide and be reflected several times from each end face before they exit. As a light wave passes through the cavity, it is amplified by stimulated emission, but light is also lost due to absorption and by incomplete reflection from the end facets. Finally, if there is more amplification than loss, the diode begins to lase.

Some important properties of laser diodes are determined by the geometry of the optical cavity. Generally, the light is contained within a very thin layer, and the structure supports only a single optical mode in the direction perpendicular to the layers. In the transverse direction, if the waveguide is wide compared to the wavelength of the light, then the waveguide can support multiple transverse optical modes, and the laser is known as multi-mode. These transversely multi-mode lasers are adequate in cases where one needs a very large amount of power, but not a small diffraction-limited TEM00 beam, such as in printing, activating chemicals, microscopy, or pumping other types of lasers.

In applications where a small, focused beam is needed, the waveguide must be made narrow, on the order of the optical wavelength. This way, only a single transverse mode is supported and one ends up with a diffraction-limited beam. Such single-spatial-mode devices are used for optical storage, laser pointers, and fiber optics. These lasers may still support multiple longitudinal modes, and thus can lase at multiple wavelengths simultaneously. The wavelength emitted is a function of the bandgap of the semiconductor material and the modes of the optical cavity. In general, the maximum gain will occur for photons with energy slightly above the bandgap energy, and the modes nearest the peak of the gain curve will lase most strongly. The width of the gain curve will determine the number of additional side modes that may also lase, depending on the operating conditions. Single-spatial-mode lasers that can support multiple longitudinal modes are called Fabry-Pérot (FP) lasers. An FP laser will lase at multiple cavity modes within the gain bandwidth of the lasing medium. The number of lasing modes in an FP laser is usually unstable and can fluctuate due to changes in current or temperature.

Single-spatial-mode diode lasers can be designed so as to operate on a single longitudinal mode. These single-frequency diode lasers exhibit a high degree of stability, and are used in spectroscopy and metrology and as frequency references. Single-frequency diode lasers are classed as either distributed-feedback (DFB) lasers or distributed Bragg reflector (DBR) lasers.

=== Formation of laser beam ===
Due to diffraction, the beam diverges (expands) rapidly after leaving the chip, typically at 30 degrees vertically by 10 degrees laterally. A lens must be used in order to form a collimated beam like that produced by a laser pointer. If a circular beam is required, then cylindrical lenses and other optics are used. For single-spatial-mode lasers, using symmetrical lenses, the collimated beam ends up being elliptical in shape, due to the difference in the vertical and lateral divergences. This is easily observable with a red laser pointer. The long axis of the ellipse is at right-angles to the plane of the chip.

The simple diode described above has been heavily modified in recent years to accommodate modern technology, resulting in a variety of types of laser diodes, as described below.

== History ==
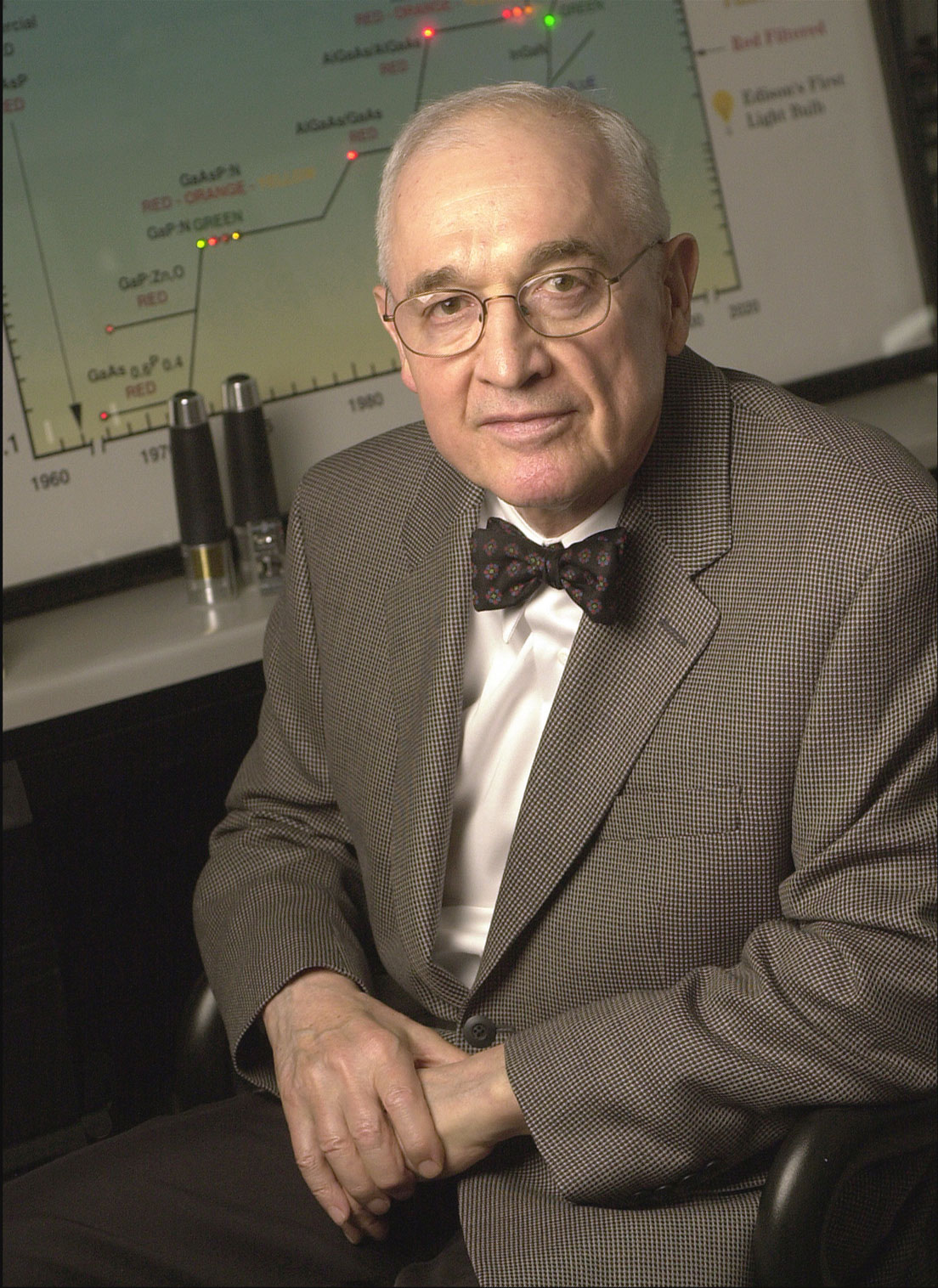
Nick Holonyak, inventor of first visible-wavelength semiconductor laser diode

Following theoretical treatments of M.G. Bernard, G. Duraffourg, and William P. Dumke in the early 1960s, coherent light emission from a gallium arsenide (GaAs) semiconductor diode (a laser diode) was demonstrated in 1962 by two US groups led by Robert N. Hall at the General Electric research center and by Marshall Nathan at the IBM T.J. Watson Research Center. There has been ongoing debate as to whether IBM or GE invented the first laser diode, which was largely based on theoretical work by William P. Dumke at IBM's Kitchawan Lab (currently known as the Thomas J. Watson Research Center) in Yorktown Heights, NY. The priority is given to the General Electric group, who submitted their results earlier; they also went further and made a resonant cavity for their diode. It was initially speculated, by MIT's Ben Lax among other leading physicists, that silicon or germanium could be used to create a lasing effect, but theoretical analyses convinced William P. Dumke that these materials would not work. Instead, he suggested gallium arsenide as a good candidate. The first visible-wavelength laser diode was demonstrated by Nick Holonyak, Jr. later in 1962; he used gallium arsenide phosphide.

Other teams at MIT Lincoln Laboratory, Texas Instruments, and RCA Laboratories were also involved in, and received credit for, their historic initial demonstrations of efficient light emission and lasing in semiconductor diodes in 1962 and thereafter. GaAs lasers were also produced in early 1963 in the Soviet Union by the team led by Nikolay Basov.

In the early 1960s, liquid-phase epitaxy (LPE) was invented by Herbert Nelson of RCA Laboratories. By layering the highest-quality crystals of varying compositions, it enabled the demonstration of the highest-quality heterojunction semiconductor laser materials for many years. LPE was adopted by all the leading laboratories worldwide and was used for many years. It was finally supplanted in the 1970s by molecular-beam epitaxy and organometallic chemical vapor deposition.

Diode lasers of that era operated with threshold current densities of 1000 A/cm^{2} at 77 K temperatures. Such performance enabled continuous lasing to be demonstrated in the earliest days. However, when operated at room temperature, about 300 K, threshold current densities were two orders of magnitude greater, or 100,000 A/cm^{2}, in the best devices. The dominant challenge for the remainder of the 1960s was to obtain low threshold current density at 300 K and thereby to demonstrate continuous-wave lasing at room temperature from a diode laser.

The first diode lasers were homojunction diodes. That is, the material (and thus the bandgap) of the waveguide core layer and that of the surrounding clad layers were identical. It was recognized that there was an opportunity, particularly afforded by the use of liquid-phase epitaxy using aluminum gallium arsenide, to introduce heterojunctions. Heterostructures consist of layers of semiconductor crystal having varying bandgap and refractive index. Heterojunctions (formed from heterostructures) had been recognized by Herbert Kroemer, while working at RCA Laboratories in the mid-1950s, as having unique advantages for several types of electronic and optoelectronic devices, including diode lasers. LPE afforded the technology of making heterojunction diode lasers. In 1963, he proposed the double heterostructure laser.

The first heterojunction diode lasers were single-heterojunction lasers. These lasers used aluminum gallium arsenide p-type injectors situated over n-type gallium arsenide layers grown on the substrate by LPE. An admixture of aluminum replaced gallium in the semiconductor crystal and raised the bandgap of the p-type injector over that of the n-type layers beneath. It worked; the 300 K threshold currents went down by 10× to 10,000 A/cm^{2}. Unfortunately, this was still not in the needed range, and these single-heterostructure diode lasers did not function in continuous-wave operation at room temperature.

The innovation that met the room temperature challenge was the double-heterostructure laser. The trick was to quickly move the wafer in the LPE apparatus between different melts of aluminum gallium arsenide (p- and n-type) and a third melt of gallium arsenide. It had to be done rapidly since the gallium arsenide core region needed to be significantly under 1 μm in thickness. The first laser diode to achieve continuous-wave operation was a double heterostructure demonstrated in 1970 essentially simultaneously by Zhores Alferov and collaborators (including Dmitri Z. Garbuzov) of the Soviet Union, and Morton Panish and Izuo Hayashi working in the United States. However, it is widely accepted that Alferov and team reached the milestone first.

For their accomplishment and that of their co-workers, Alferov and Kroemer shared the 2000 Nobel Prize in Physics.

== Types ==
The simple laser diode structure described above is inefficient. Such devices require so much power that they can only achieve pulsed operation without damage. Although historically important and easy to explain, such devices are not practical.

=== Double heterostructure lasers ===
Diagram of front view of a double heterostructure laser diode; not to scale

In these devices, a layer of low-bandgap material is sandwiched between two high-bandgap layers. One commonly used pair of materials is gallium arsenide (GaAs) with aluminium gallium arsenide (Al_{x}Ga_{(1-x)}As). Each of the junctions between different bandgap materials is called a heterostructure, hence the name double heterostructure (DH) laser. The kind of laser diode described in the first part of the article may be referred to as a homojunction laser, for contrast with these more popular devices.

The advantage of a DH laser is that the region where free electrons and holes exist simultaneously—the active region—is confined to the thin middle layer. This means that many more of the electron-hole pairs can contribute to amplification—not so many are left out in the poorly amplifying periphery. In addition, light is reflected within the heterojunction; hence, the light is confined to the region where the amplification takes place.

=== Quantum well lasers ===
Diagram of front view of a simple quantum well laser diode; not to scale

If the middle layer is made thin enough, it acts as a quantum well. This means that the vertical variation of the electron's wavefunction, and thus a component of its energy, is quantized. The efficiency of a quantum well laser is greater than that of a bulk laser because the density of states function of electrons in the quantum well system has an abrupt edge that concentrates electrons in energy states that contribute to laser action.

Lasers containing more than one quantum well layer are known as multiple quantum well lasers. Multiple quantum wells improve the overlap of the gain region with the optical waveguide mode.

Further improvements in laser efficiency have also been demonstrated by reducing the quantum well layer(s) to a layer(s) with quantum wires and especially quantum dots.

=== Quantum cascade lasers ===
In a quantum cascade laser, the difference between quantum well energy levels is used for the laser transition instead of the bandgap. This enables laser action at relatively long wavelengths, which can be tuned simply by altering the thickness of the layer. They are heterojunction lasers.

=== Interband cascade lasers ===
An interband cascade laser (ICL) is a type of laser diode that can produce coherent radiation over a large part of the mid-infrared region of the electromagnetic spectrum.

=== Separate confinement heterostructure lasers ===
Diagram of front view of a separate confinement heterostructure quantum well laser diode; not to scale

The problem with the simple quantum well diode described above is that the thin layer is simply too small to effectively confine the light. To compensate, another two layers are added on, outside the first three. These layers have a lower refractive index than the center layers, and hence confine the light effectively. Such a design is called a separate confinement heterostructure (SCH) laser diode.

Almost all commercial laser diodes since the 1990s have been SCH quantum well diodes.

=== Distributed Bragg reflector lasers ===
A distributed Bragg reflector laser (DBR) is a type of single-frequency laser diode. It is characterized by an optical cavity consisting of an electrically or optically pumped gain region between two mirrors to provide feedback. One of the mirrors is a broadband reflector and the other mirror is wavelength selective so that gain is favored on a single longitudinal mode, resulting in lasing at a single resonant frequency. The broadband mirror is usually coated with a low-reflectivity coating to allow emission. The wavelength-selective mirror is a periodically structured diffraction grating with high reflectivity. The diffraction grating is within a non-pumped, or passive, region of the cavity. A DBR laser is a monolithic single-chip device with the grating etched into the semiconductor. DBR lasers can be edge-emitting lasers or VCSELs. Alternative hybrid architectures that share the same topology include extended-cavity diode lasers and volume Bragg grating lasers, but these are not properly called DBR lasers.

=== Distributed-feedback lasers ===
A distributed-feedback laser (DFB) is a type of single-frequency laser diode. DFBs are the most common transmitter type in DWDM systems. To stabilize the lasing wavelength, a diffraction grating is etched close to the p–n junction of the diode. This grating acts like an optical filter, causing a single wavelength to be fed back to the gain region and lase. Since the grating provides the feedback that is required for lasing, reflection from the facets is not required. Thus, at least one facet of a DFB is anti-reflection coated. The DFB laser has a stable wavelength that is set during manufacturing by the pitch of the grating, and can only be tuned slightly with temperature. DFB lasers are widely used in optical communication applications where a precise and stable wavelength is critical.

The threshold current of this DFB laser, based on its static characteristic, is around 11 mA. The appropriate bias current in a linear regime could be taken in the middle of the static characteristic (50 mA). Several techniques have been proposed in order to enhance the single-mode operation in these kinds of lasers by inserting a one-phase-shift (1PS) or multiple-phase-shift (MPS) in the uniform Bragg grating. However, multiple-phase-shift DFB lasers represent the optimal solution because they have the combination of higher side-mode suppression ratio and reduced spatial hole-burning.

=== Vertical-cavity surface-emitting laser ===
Diagram of a simple VCSEL structure; not to scale

Vertical-cavity surface-emitting lasers (VCSELs) have the optical cavity axis along the direction of current flow rather than perpendicular to the current flow as in conventional laser diodes. The active region length is very short compared with the lateral dimensions so that the radiation emerges from the surface of the cavity rather than from its edge as shown in the figure. The reflectors at the ends of the cavity are dielectric mirrors made from alternating high- and low-refractive-index quarter-wave-thick multilayer.

Such dielectric mirrors provide a high degree of wavelength-selective reflectance at the required free surface wavelength λ if the thicknesses of alternating layers d_{1} and d_{2} with refractive indices n_{1} and n_{2} are such that n_{1}d_{1} + n_{2}d_{2} = λ/2, which then leads to the constructive interference of all partially reflected waves at the interfaces. But there is a disadvantage: because of the high mirror reflectivities, VCSELs have lower output powers when compared to edge-emitting lasers.

There are several advantages to producing VCSELs when compared with the production process of edge-emitting lasers. Edge-emitters cannot be tested until the end of the production process. If the edge-emitter does not work, whether due to bad contacts or poor material growth quality, then the production time and the processing materials have been wasted.

Additionally, because VCSELs emit the beam perpendicular to the active region of the laser as opposed to parallel as with an edge emitter, tens of thousands of VCSELs can be processed simultaneously on a three-inch gallium arsenide wafer. Furthermore, even though the VCSEL production process is more labor- and material-intensive, the yield can be controlled to a more predictable outcome. However, they normally show a lower power output level.

=== Vertical-external-cavity surface-emitting-laser ===
Vertical-external-cavity surface-emitting lasers, or VECSELs, are similar to VCSELs. In VCSELs, the mirrors are typically grown epitaxially as part of the diode structure, or grown separately and bonded directly to the semiconductor containing the active region. VECSELs are distinguished by a construction in which one of the two mirrors is external to the diode structure. As a result, the cavity includes a free-space region. A typical distance from the diode to the external mirror would be 1 cm.

One of the most interesting features of any VECSEL is the small thickness of the semiconductor gain region in the direction of propagation, less than 100 nm. In contrast, a conventional in-plane semiconductor laser entails light propagation over distances of from 250 μm upward to 2 mm or longer. The significance of the short propagation distance is that it causes the effect of antiguiding nonlinearities in the diode laser gain region to be minimized. The result is a large-cross-section single-mode optical beam that is not attainable from in-plane ("edge-emitting") diode lasers.

Several workers demonstrated optically pumped VECSELs, and they continue to be developed for many applications, including high-power sources for use in industrial machining (cutting, punching, etc.) because of their unusually high power and efficiency when pumped by multi-mode diode laser bars. However, because of their lack of p–n junctions, optically pumped VECSELs are not considered diode lasers, and are classified as semiconductor lasers.

Electrically pumped VECSELs have also been demonstrated. Applications for electrically pumped VECSELs include projection displays, served by frequency doubling of near-IR VECSEL emitters to produce blue and green light.

=== External-cavity diode lasers ===
External-cavity diode lasers (ECDLs) are tunable lasers which utilize a resonant optical cavity to feed light back to the laser. The first external-cavity diode lasers used intracavity etalons and simple tuning Littrow gratings. Other designs include gratings in grazing-incidence configuration, multiple-prism grating configurations, and piezo-transduced diode laser configuration.

== Reliability ==
Laser diodes have the same reliability and failure issues as light-emitting diodes. In addition, they are subject to catastrophic optical damage COD, when operated at higher power.

Many advances in diode laser reliability made since the early 2000s remain proprietary to their developers. Reverse engineering is not always able to reveal the differences between more reliable and less reliable products.

Semiconductor lasers can be surface-emitting lasers such as VCSELs, or in-plane edge-emitting lasers. For edge-emitting lasers, the edge facet mirror is often formed by cleaving the semiconductor wafer to form a specularly reflecting plane. This approach is facilitated by the weakness of the [110] crystallographic plane in III-V semiconductor crystals, such as GaAs, InP, GaSb, etc. compared to the other planes.

The atomic states at the cleavage plane are altered compared to their bulk properties within the crystal by the termination of the perfectly periodic lattice at that plane. Surface states at the cleaved plane have energy levels within the otherwise forbidden bandgap of the semiconductor. Thus, when light propagates through the cleavage plane and transits to free space from within the semiconductor crystal a fraction of the light energy is absorbed by the surface states, where it is converted to the heat by phonon-electron interactions. This heats the cleaved mirror. In addition, the mirror may heat simply because the edge of the diode laser—which is electrically pumped—is in less-than-perfect contact with the mount that provides a path for heat removal.

The heating of the mirror causes the bandgap of the semiconductor to shrink in the warmer areas. The bandgap shrinkage brings more electronic band-to-band transitions into alignment with the photon energy, causing yet more absorption. This is thermal runaway, a form of the positive feedback, and the result can be melting of the facet, known as catastrophic optical damage - COD.

In the 1970s, this problem, which is particularly nettlesome for GaAs-based lasers emitting between 0.630 μm and 1 μm (less so for InP-based lasers used for long-haul telecommunications, which emit between 1.3 μm and 2 μm), was identified.

Michael Ettenberg, a researcher and later Vice President at RCA Laboratories' David Sarnoff Research Center in Princeton, New Jersey devised a solution. A thin layer of aluminum oxide was deposited on the facet. If the aluminum oxide thickness is chosen correctly, it functions as an anti-reflective coating, reducing reflection at the surface. This alleviated the heating and COD at the facet.

Since then, various other refinements have been employed. One approach is to create a so-called non-absorbing mirror (NAM) such that the final 10 μm or so before the light emits from the cleaved facet are rendered non-absorbing at the wavelength of the interest.

In the very early 1990s, SDL Inc. began supplying high-power diode lasers with good reliability characteristics. CEO Donald Scifres and CTO David Welch presented new reliability performance data at, e.g., SPIE Photonics West conferences of the era. The methods used by SDL to defeat COD were considered to be highly proprietary and were still undisclosed publicly as June of 2006.

In the mid-1990s, IBM Research - Ruschlikon, Switzerland announced that it had devised its so-called E2 process, which conferred extraordinary resistance to the COD in GaAs-based lasers. This process also was undisclosed as of June 2006.

Reliability of high-power diode laser pump bars (used to pump solid-state lasers) remains difficult problem in the variety of applications, in spite of these proprietary advances. Indeed, the physics of diode laser failure is still being worked out, and research on this subject remains active, if proprietary.

Extension of the lifetime of laser diodes is critical to their continued adaptation to a wide variety of applications.

== Applications ==
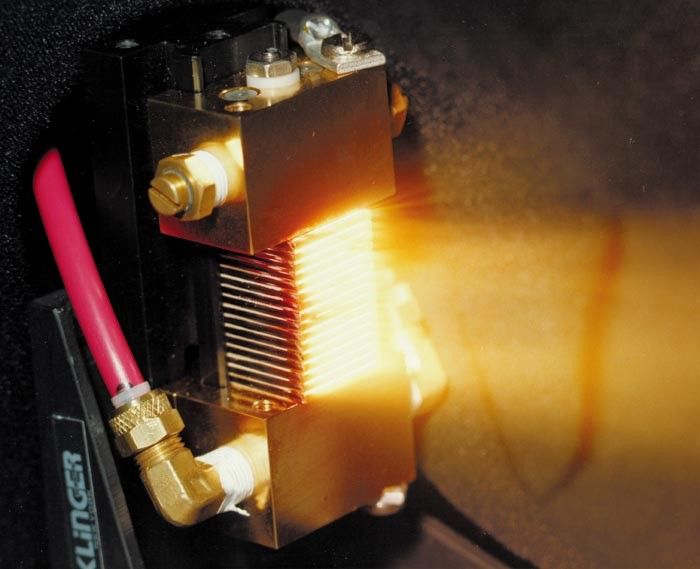
Laser diodes can be arrayed to produce very high power outputs, continuous-wave or pulsed. Such arrays may be used to efficiently pump solid-state lasers for high-average-power drilling or burning and for inertial confinement fusion.

Laser diodes are numerically the most common laser type, with 2004 sales of approximately 733 million units, as compared to 131,000 of other types of lasers.

=== Telecommunications, scanning, and spectrometry ===
Laser diodes are widely used in telecommunications as easily modulated and easily coupled light sources for fiber-optic communication. They are used in various measuring instruments, such as rangefinders. Another common use is in barcode readers. Visible lasers, typically red but later also green, are common as laser pointers.

Both low- and high-power diodes are used extensively in the printing industry, both as light sources for scanning (input) of images and for very-high-speed and high-resolution printing plate (output) manufacturing.

Infrared and red laser diodes are common in CD players, CD-ROMs, and DVD technology. Violet lasers are used in HD DVD and Blu-ray technology. Diode lasers have also found many applications in laser absorption spectrometry (LAS) for high-speed, low-cost assessment or monitoring of the concentration of various species in gas phase.

High-power laser diodes are used in industrial applications such as heat treating, cladding, seam welding, and for pumping other lasers, such as diode-pumped solid-state lasers.

Uses of laser diodes can be categorized in various ways. Most applications could be served by larger solid-state lasers or optical parametric oscillators, but the low cost of mass-produced diode lasers makes them essential for mass-market applications. Diode lasers can be used in a great many fields; since light has many different properties (power, wavelength, spectral and beam quality, polarization, etc.), it is useful to classify applications by these basic properties.

Many applications of diode lasers primarily make use of the directed energy property of the optical beam. In this category, one might include

- laser printers
- barcode readers
- image scanning
- illuminators
- designators
- optical data recording
- combustion ignition
- laser surgery - laser used to cut the tissue
- industrial [optical] sorting
- industrial machining
- wireless power transfer, as power beaming
- directed energy weaponry

Some of the above applications are well-established, while others are emerging.

=== Medical uses ===
Laser medicine: medicine and especially dentistry have found many new uses for diode lasers. The shrinking size and cost of the units and their increasing user-friendliness makes them very attractive to clinicians for minor soft-tissue procedures.

Diode wavelengths range from 810 to 1,100 nm, are poorly absorbed by soft tissue, and are not used for cutting or ablation. Soft tissue is not cut by the laser's beam, but is instead cut by contact with a hot charred glass tip. The laser's irradiation is highly absorbed at the distal end of the tip and heats it up to 500–900°C. Because the tip is so hot, it can be used to cut soft tissue and can cause hemostasis through cauterization and carbonization. Diode lasers when used on soft tissue can cause extensive collateral thermal damage to surrounding tissue.

As laser beam light is inherently coherent, certain applications use the coherence of laser diodes. These include interferometric distance measurement, holography, coherent communications, and coherent control of chemical reactions.

Laser diodes are used for their narrow spectral properties in the areas of range-finding, telecommunications, infra-red countermeasures, spectroscopic sensing, generation of radio-frequency or terahertz waves, atomic clock state preparation, quantum key cryptography, frequency doubling and conversion, water purification (in the UV), and photodynamic therapy (where a particular wavelength of light would cause a substance such as porphyrin to become chemically active as an anti-cancer agent only where the tissue is illuminated by light).

Laser diodes are used for their ability to generate ultra-short pulses of light by the technique known as mode-locking. Areas of use include clock distribution for high-performance integrated circuits, high-peak-power sources for laser-induced breakdown spectroscopy sensing, arbitrary waveform generation for radio-frequency waves, photonic sampling for analog-to-digital conversion, and optical code-division-multiple-access systems for secure communication.

=== Maskless photolithography ===
Laser diodes are used as a light source for maskless photolithography.

== Common wavelengths ==
=== Visible light ===
- 405 nm: InGaN blue-violet laser, in Blu-ray Disc and HD DVD drives
- 445–465 nm: InGaN blue laser multimode diode for use in mercury-free high-brightness data projectors
- 488 nm: InGaN green-blue laser; became widely available in mid-2018.
- 505 nm: InGaN bluish-green laser; also became widely available in mid-2018.
- 510–525 nm: InGaN green diodes developed by Nichia and OSRAM for laser projectors.
- 635 nm: AlGaInP better red-laser pointers, same power subjectively twice as bright as 650 nm
- 650–660 nm: GaInP/AlGaInP CD and DVD drives, cheap red laser pointers
- 670 nm: AlGaInP bar-code readers, first diode-laser pointers (now obsolete, replaced by brighter 650 nm and 671 nm DPSS)

=== Infrared ===
- 760 nm: AlGaInP gas sensing: O_{2}
- 785 nm: GaAlAs compact disc drives
- 808 nm: GaAlAs pumps in DPSS Nd:YAG lasers (e.g., in green laser pointers or as arrays in higher-powered lasers)
- 848 nm: laser mice
- 980 nm: InGaAs pump for optical amplifiers, for Yb:YAG DPSS lasers
- 1,064 nm: AlGaAs fiber-optic communication, DPSS laser pump frequency
- 1,310 nm: InGaAsP, InGaAsN fiber-optic communication
- 1,480 nm: InGaAsP pump for optical amplifiers
- 1,512 nm: InGaAsP gas sensing: NH_{3}
- 1,550 nm: InGaAsP, InGaAsNSb fiber-optic communication
- 1,625 nm: InGaAsP fiber-optic communication, service channel
- 1,654 nm: InGaAsP gas sensing: CH_{4}
- 1,877 nm: GaInAsSb gas sensing: H_{2}O
- 2,004 nm: GaInAsSb gas sensing: CO_{2}
- 2,330 nm: GaInAsSb gas sensing: CO
- 2,680 nm: GaInAsSb gas sensing: CO_{2}
- 3,030 nm: GaInAsSb gas sensing: C_{2}H_{2}
- 3,330 nm: GaInAsSb gas sensing: CH_{4}

== See also ==
- Collimating lens
- Laser safety
- List of laser articles
- Superluminescent diode
