= Catastrophic optical damage =

Failure mode of semiconductor lasers

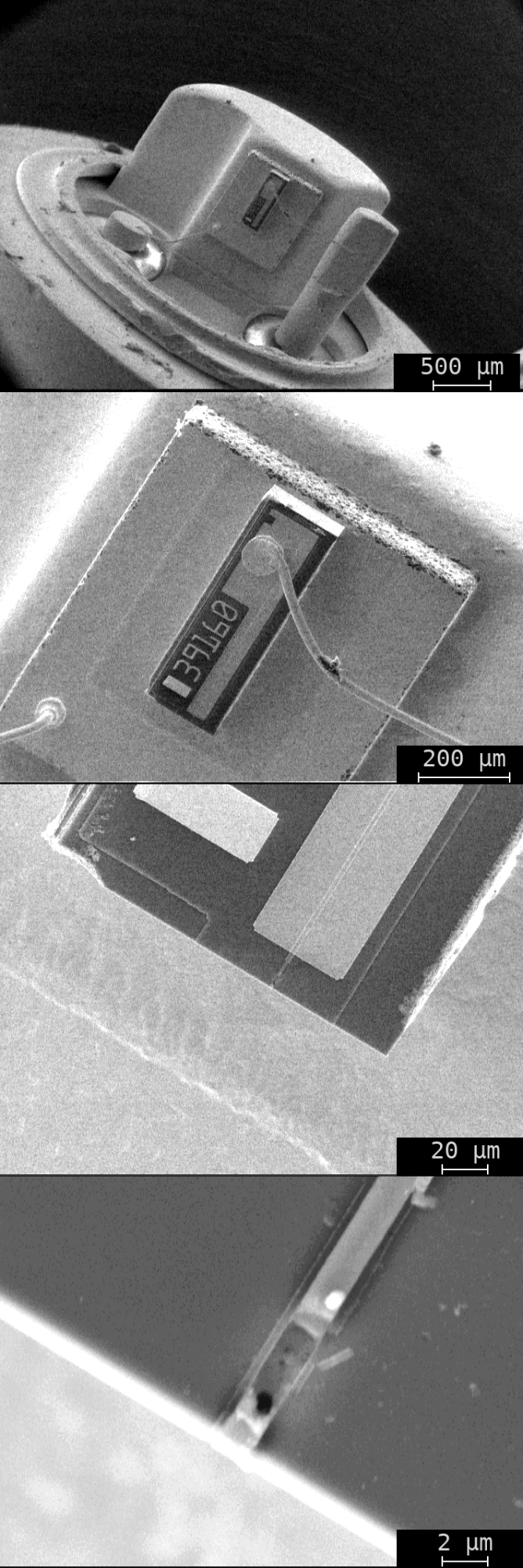
Four electron micrographs of a green laser diode PLT5 with catastrophic optical damage on one side of its waveguide

Catastrophic optical damage (COD), or catastrophic optical mirror damage (COMD), is a failure mode of high-power semiconductor lasers. It occurs when the semiconductor junction is overloaded by exceeding its power density and absorbs too much of the produced light energy, leading to melting and recrystallization of the semiconductor material at the facets of the laser. This is often colloquially referred to as "blowing the diode". The affected area contains a large number of lattice defects, negatively affecting its performance. If the affected area is sufficiently large, it can be observable under optical microscope as darkening of the laser facet, and/or as presence of cracks and grooves. The damage can occur within a single laser pulse, in less than a millisecond. The time to COD is inversely proportional to the power density.

Catastrophic optical damage is one of the limiting factors in increasing performance of semiconductor lasers. It is the primary failure mode for AlGaInP/AlGaAs red lasers.

Short-wavelength lasers are more susceptible to COD than long-wavelength ones.

The typical values for COD in industrial products range between 12 and 20 MW/cm^{2}.

== Causes and mechanisms ==
At the edge of a diode laser, where light is emitted, a mirror is traditionally formed by cleaving the semiconductor wafer to form a specularly reflecting plane. This approach is facilitated by the weakness of the [110] crystallographic plane in III-V semiconductor crystals (such as GaAs, InP, GaSb, etc.) compared to other planes. A scratch made at the edge of the wafer and a slight bending force causes a nearly atomically perfect mirror-like cleavage plane to form and propagate in a straight line across the wafer.

But it so happens that the atomic states at the cleavage plane are altered (compared to their bulk properties within the crystal) by the termination of the perfectly periodic lattice at that plane. Surface states at the cleaved plane have energy levels within the (otherwise forbidden) band gap of the semiconductor.

The absorbed light causes generation of electron-hole pairs. These can lead to breaking of chemical bonds on the crystal surface followed by oxidation, or to release of heat by nonradiative recombination. The oxidized surface then shows increased absorption of the laser light, which further accelerates its degradation. The oxidation is especially problematic for semiconductor layers containing aluminium.

Essentially, as a result when light propagates through the cleavage plane and transits to free space from within the semiconductor crystal, a fraction of the light energy is absorbed by the surface states where it is converted to heat by phonon-electron interactions. This heats the cleaved mirror. In addition the mirror may heat simply because the edge of the diode laser—which is electrically pumped—is in less-than-perfect contact with the mount that provides a path for heat removal. The heating of the mirror causes the band gap of the semiconductor to shrink in the warmer areas. The band gap shrinkage brings more electronic band-to-band transitions into alignment with the photon energy causing yet more absorption. This is thermal runaway, a form of positive feedback, and the result can be melting of the facet, known as catastrophic optical damage, or COD.

Deterioration of the laser facets with aging and effects of the environment (erosion by water, oxygen, etc.) increases light absorption by the surface, and decreases the COD threshold. A sudden catastrophic failure of the laser due to COD then can occur after many thousands hours in service.

== Improvements ==
One of the methods of increasing the COD threshold in AlGaInP laser structures is the sulfur treatment, which replaces the oxides at the laser facet with chalcogenide glasses. This decreases the recombination velocity of the surface states.

Reduction of recombination velocity of surface states can be also achieved by cleaving the crystals in ultrahigh vacuum and immediate deposition of a suitable passivation layer.

A thin layer of aluminium can be deposited over the surface, for gettering the oxygen.

Another approach is doping of the surface, increasing the band gap and decreasing absorption of the lasing wavelength, shifting the absorption maximum several nanometers up.

Current crowding near the mirror area can be avoided by prevention of injecting charge carriers near the mirror region. This is achieved by depositing the electrodes away from the mirror, at least several carrier diffusion distances.

Energy density on the surface can be reduced by employing a waveguide broadening the optical cavity, so the same amount of energy exits through a larger area. Energy density of 15–20 MW/cm^{2} corresponding to 100 mW per micrometer of stripe width are now achievable. A wider laser stripe can be used for higher output power, for the cost of transverse mode oscillations and therefore worsening of spectral and spatial beam quality.

In the 1970s, this problem, which is particularly nettlesome for GaAs-based lasers emitting between 1 μm and 0.630 μm wavelengths (less so for InP based lasers used for long-haul telecommunications which emit between 1.3 μm and 2 μm), was identified. Michael Ettenberg, a researcher and later Vice President at RCA Laboratories' David Sarnoff Research Center in Princeton, New Jersey, devised a solution. A thin layer of aluminum oxide was deposited on the facet. If the aluminum oxide thickness is chosen correctly, it functions as an anti-reflective coating, reducing reflection at the surface. This alleviated the heating and COD at the facet.

Since then, various other refinements have been employed. One approach is to create a so-called non-absorbing mirror (NAM) such that the final 10 μm or so before the light emits from the cleaved facet are rendered non-absorbing at the wavelength of interest. Such lasers are called window lasers.

In the very early 1990s, SDL, Inc. began supplying high power diode lasers with good reliability characteristics. CEO Donald Scifres and CTO David Welch presented new reliability performance data at, e.g., SPIE Photonics West conferences of the era. The methods used by SDL to defeat COD were considered to be highly proprietary and have still not been disclosed publicly as of June, 2006.

In the mid-1990s IBM Research (Ruschlikon, Switzerland) announced that it had devised its so-called "E2 process" which conferred extraordinary resistance to COD in GaAs-based lasers. This process, too, has never been disclosed as of June, 2006.
