= Distributed-feedback laser =

Type of laser diode

A distributed-feedback laser (DFB) is a type of laser diode, quantum-cascade laser or optical-fiber laser where the active region of the device contains a periodically structured element or diffraction grating. The structure builds a one-dimensional interference grating (Bragg scattering), and the grating provides optical feedback for the laser. This longitudinal diffraction grating has periodic changes in refractive index that cause reflection back into the cavity. The periodic change can be either in the real part of the refractive index or in the imaginary part (gain or absorption). The strongest grating operates in the first order, where the periodicity is one-half wave, and the light is reflected backwards. DFB lasers tend to be much more stable than Fabry–Perot or DBR lasers and are used frequently when clean single-mode operation is needed, especially in high-speed fiber-optic telecommunications. Semiconductor DFB lasers in the lowest loss window of optical fibers at about 1.55 μm wavelength, amplified by erbium-doped fiber amplifiers (EDFAs), dominate the long-distance communication market, while DFB lasers in the lowest dispersion window at 1.3 μm are used at shorter distances.

The simplest kind of laser is a Fabry–Perot laser, where there are two broad-band reflectors at the two ends of the lasing optical cavity. The light bounces back and forth between these two mirrors and forms longitudinal modes, or standing waves. The back reflector generally has high reflectivity, and the front mirror has lower reflectivity. The light then leaks out of the front mirror and forms the output of the laser diode. Since the mirrors are generally broad-band and reflect many wavelengths, the laser supports multiple longitudinal modes, or standing waves, simultaneously and lases multimode, or easily jumps between longitudinal modes. If the temperature of a semiconductor Fabry–Perot laser changes, the wavelengths that are amplified by the lasing medium vary rapidly. At the same time, the longitudinal modes of the laser also vary, as the refractive index is also a function of temperature. This causes the spectrum to be unstable and highly temperature-dependent. At the important wavelengths of 1.55 μm and 1.3 μm, the peak gain typically moves about 0.4 nm to the longer wavelengths as the temperature increases, while the longitudinal modes shift about 0.1 nm to the longer wavelengths.

If one or both of these end mirrors are replaced with a diffraction grating, the structure is then known as a DBR laser (distributed Bragg reflector). These longitudinal diffraction-grating mirrors reflect the light back in the cavity, very much like a multi-layer mirror coating. The diffraction-grating mirrors tend to reflect a narrower band of wavelengths than normal end mirrors, and this limits the number of standing waves that can be supported by the gain in the cavity. So DBR lasers tend to be more spectrally stable than Fabry–Perot lasers with broadband coatings. Nevertheless, as the temperature or current changes in the laser, the device can "mode-hop", jumping from one standing wave to another. The overall shifts with temperature are, however, lower with DBR lasers, as the mirrors determine which longitudinal modes lase, and they shift with the refractive index and not the peak gain.

In a DFB laser, the grating and the reflection is generally continuous along the cavity, instead of just being at the two ends. This changes the modal behavior considerably and makes the laser more stable. There are various designs of DFB lasers, each with slightly different properties.

If the grating is periodic and continuous, and the ends of the laser are anti-reflection (AR/AR) coated, so there is no feedback other than the grating itself, then such a structure supports two longitudinal (degenerate) modes and almost always lases at two wavelengths. Obviously, a two-moded laser is generally not desirable. So there are various ways of breaking this "degeneracy".

The first is by inducing a quarter-wave shift in the cavity. This phase-shift acts like a "defect" and creates a resonance in the center of the reflectivity bandwidth or "stop-band". The laser then lases at this resonance and is extremely stable. As the temperature and current changes, the grating and the cavity shift together at the lower rate of the refractive-index change, and there are no mode hops. However, light is emitted from both sides of the lasers, and generally the light from one side is wasted. Furthermore, creating an exact quarter-wave shift can be technologically difficult to achieve, and often requires directly written electron-beam lithography. Often, rather than a single quarter-wave phase shift at the center of the cavity, multiple smaller shifts distributed in the cavity at different locations that spread out the mode longitudinally and give higher output power.

An alternate way of breaking this degeneracy is by coating the back end of the laser to a high reflectivity (HR). The exact position of this end reflector cannot be accurately controlled, and so one obtains a random phase shift between the grating and the exact position of the end mirror. Sometimes this leads to a perfect phase shift, where effectively a quarter-wave phase shifted DFB is reflected on itself. In this case all the light exits the front facet, and one obtains a very stable laser. At other times, however, the phase shift between the grating and the high-reflector back mirror is not optimal, and one ends up with a two-moded laser again. Additionally, the phase of the cleave affects the wavelength, and thus controlling the output wavelength of a batch of lasers in manufacturing can be a challenge. Thus the HR/AR DFB lasers tend to have low yield and must be screened before use. There are various combinations of coatings and phase shifts that can be optimized for power and yield, and generally each manufacturer has their own technique to optimize performance and yield.

To encode data on a DFB laser for fiber-optic communications, generally the electric drive current is varied to modulate the intensity of the light. These DMLs (directly modulated lasers) are the simplest kinds and are found in various fiber-optic systems. The disadvantage of directly modulating a laser is that there are associated frequency shifts together with the intensity shifts (laser chirp). These frequency shifts, together with dispersion in the fiber, cause the signal to degrade after some distance, limiting the bandwidth and the range. An alternate structure is an electro-absorption modulated laser (EML) that runs the laser continuously and has a separate section integrated in front that either absorbs or transmits the light – very much like an optical shutter. These EMLs can operate at higher speeds and have much lower chirp. In very high-performance coherent optical communication systems, the DFB laser is run continuously and is followed by a phase modulator. On the receiving end, a local oscillator DFB interferes with the received signal and decodes the modulation.

An alternative approach is a phase-shifted DFB laser. In this case, both facets are anti-reflection coated, and there is a phase shift in the cavity. Such devices have much better reproducibility in wavelength and theoretically all lase in single mode.

A phase-shifted DFB laser and a wavelength-tunable laser were first demonstrated at the Tokyo Institute of Technology as part of work on long-wavelength single-mode semiconductor lasers for optical fiber communication.

In DFB fiber lasers, the Bragg grating (which in this case forms also the cavity of the laser) has a phase-shift centered in the reflection band akin to a single very narrow transmission notch of a Fabry–Pérot interferometer. When configured properly, these lasers operate on a single longitudinal mode with coherence lengths in excess of tens of kilometres, essentially limited by the temporal noise induced by the self-heterodyne coherence detection technique used to measure the coherence. These DFB fibre lasers are often used in sensing applications where extreme narrow line width is required.
