= Gallium nitride =

Chemical semiconductor compound

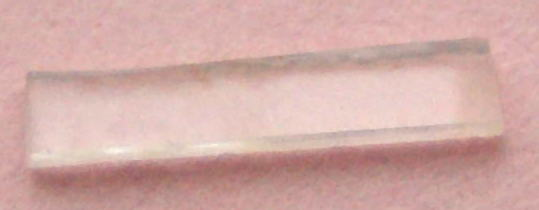

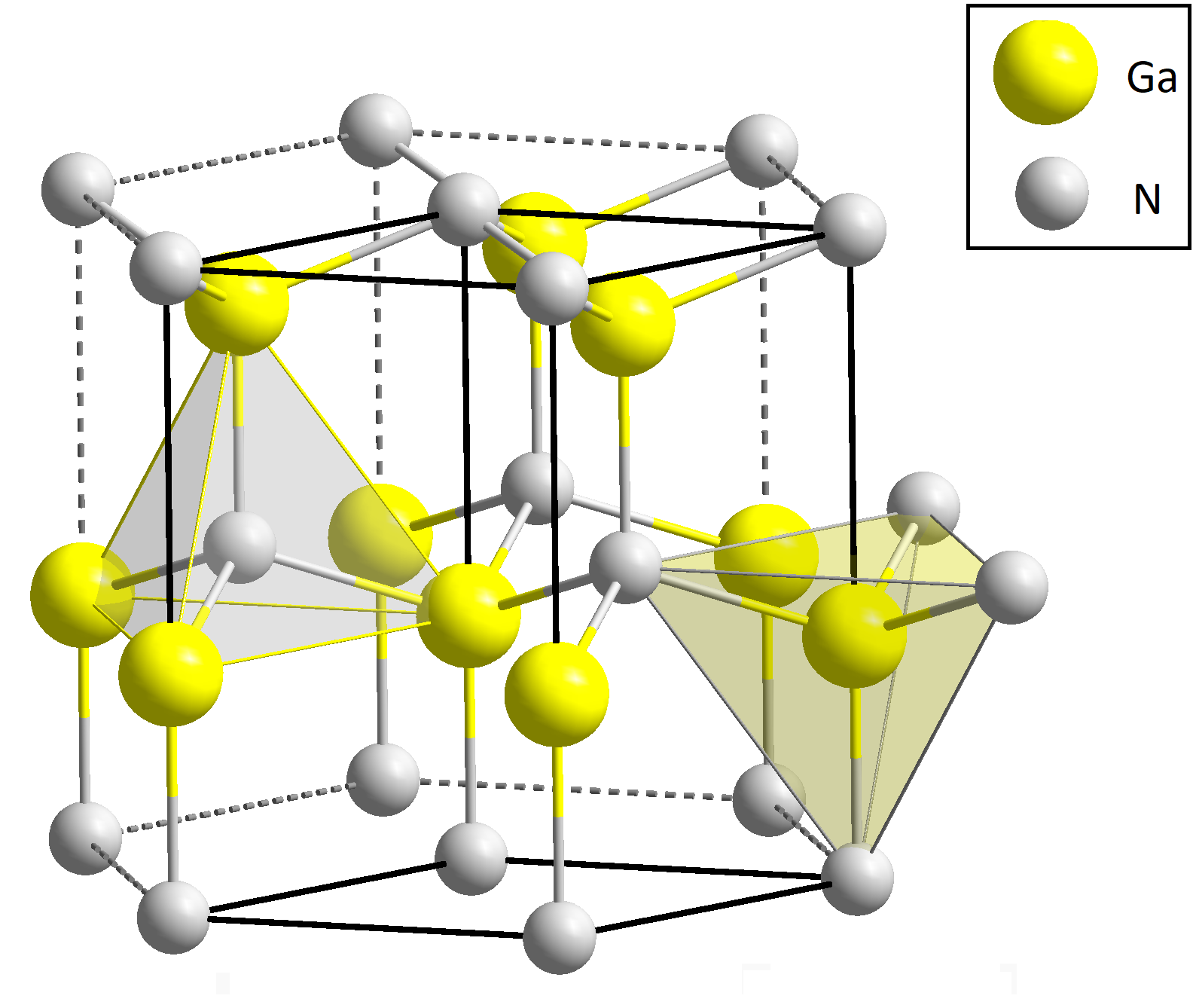

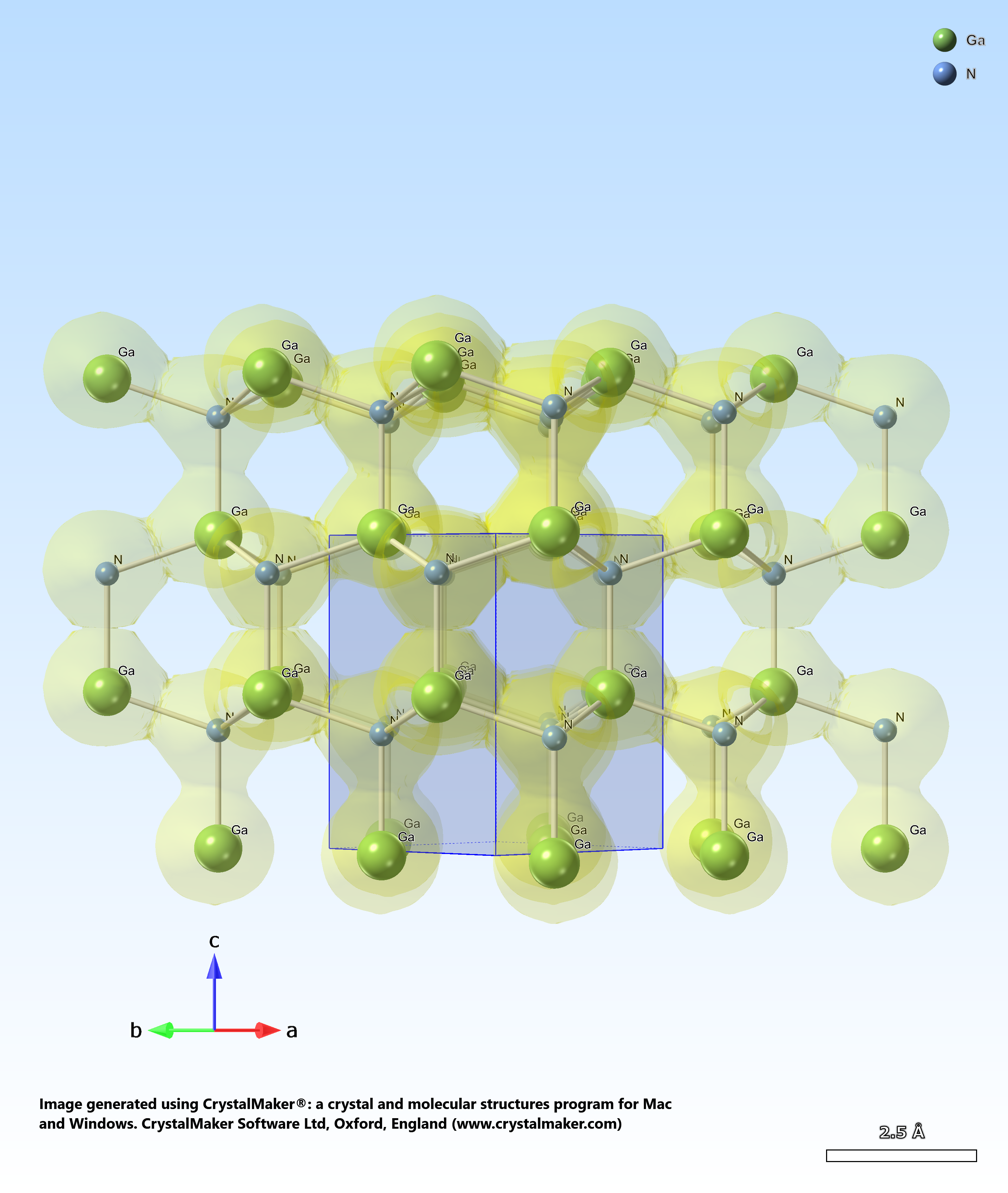

Names
- IUPAC name gallium nitride
- Other names gallium(III) nitride

Identifiers
CAS Number	25617-97-4
3D model (JSmol)	Interactive image; Interactive image
ChemSpider	105057
ECHA InfoCard	100.042.830
PubChem CID	117559
UNII	1R9CC3P9VL
CompTox Dashboard (EPA)	DTXSID2067111
- InChI: InChI=1S/Ga.N Key: JMASRVWKEDWRBT-UHFFFAOYSA-N; InChI=1/Ga.N/rGaN/c1-2 Key: JMASRVWKEDWRBT-MDMVGGKAAI
- SMILES: [Ga]#N; [Ga+3].[N-3]

Properties
Chemical formula	GaN
Molar mass	83.730 g·mol^{-1}
Appearance	yellow powder
Density	6.1 g/cm^{3}
Melting point	> 1600 °C
Solubility in water	Insoluble
Band gap	3.4 eV (300 K, direct)
Electron mobility	1500 cm^{2}/(V·s) (300 K)
Thermal conductivity	1.3 W/(cm·K) (300 K)
Refractive index (n_{D})	2.429

Structure
Crystal structure	Wurtzite
Space group	C_{6v}^{4}-P6_{3}mc
Lattice constant	a = 318.9 pm, c = 518.6 pm
Coordination geometry	Tetrahedral

Thermochemistry
Std enthalpy of formation (Δ_{f}H^{⦵}_{298})	−110.2 kJ/mol

Hazards
- GHS labelling
Pictograms	(GHS07: Exclamation mark)
Signal word	Warning
Hazard statements	H317
Precautionary statements	P261, P272, P280, P302+P352, P321, P333+P313, P501
NFPA 704 (fire diamond)	2 0 0
Flash point	Non-flammable
Safety data sheet (SDS)	Sigma-Aldrich Co., Gallium nitride. Retrieved on 18 February 2024.

Related compounds
Other anions	gallium phosphide gallium arsenide gallium antimonide
Other cations	boron nitride aluminium nitride indium nitride
Related compounds	aluminium gallium arsenide indium gallium arsenide gallium arsenide phosphide aluminium gallium nitride indium gallium nitride
- Except where otherwise noted, data are given for materials in their standard state (at 25 °C [77 °F], 100 kPa). verify (what is ?) Infobox references

Gallium nitride (GaN) is a binary III/V direct bandgap semiconductor commonly used in blue light-emitting diodes since the 1990s. The compound is a very hard material that has a Wurtzite crystal structure. Its wide band gap of 3.4 eV affords it special properties for applications in optoelectronics, high-power and high-frequency devices. For example, GaN is the substrate that makes violet (405 nm) laser diodes possible, without requiring nonlinear optical frequency doubling.

Its sensitivity to ionizing radiation is low (like other group III nitrides), making it a suitable material for solar cell arrays for satellites. Military and space applications could also benefit as devices have shown stability in high-radiation environments.

Because GaN transistors can operate at much higher temperatures and work at much higher voltages than gallium arsenide (GaAs) transistors, they make ideal power amplifiers at microwave frequencies. In addition, GaN offers promising characteristics for THz devices. Due to high power density and voltage breakdown limits GaN is also emerging as a promising candidate for 5G cellular base station applications. Since the early 2020s, GaN power transistors have come into increasing use in power supplies in electronic equipment, converting AC mains electricity to low-voltage DC, as well as higher-voltage applications such as electric vehicle traction inverters due to their small size, fast switching speed and high efficiency.

== Physical properties ==
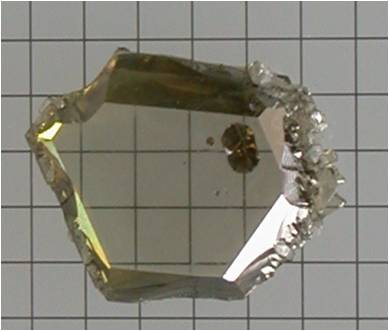
GaN crystal

GaN is a very hard (Knoop hardness 14.21 GPa), mechanically stable wide-bandgap semiconductor material with high heat capacity and thermal conductivity. In its pure form it resists cracking and can be deposited in thin film on sapphire or silicon carbide, despite the mismatch in their lattice constants. GaN can be doped with silicon (Si) or with oxygen to n-type and with magnesium (Mg) to p-type. However, the Si and Mg atoms change the way the GaN crystals grow, introducing tensile stresses and making them brittle. Gallium nitride compounds also tend to have a high dislocation density, on the order of 10^{8} to 10^{10} defects per square centimeter.

The U.S. Army Research Laboratory (ARL) provided the first measurement of the high field electron velocity in GaN in 1999. Scientists at ARL experimentally obtained a peak steady-state velocity of 1.9×10^{7} cm/s, with a transit time of 2.5 picoseconds, attained at an electric field of 225 kV/cm. With this information, the electron mobility was calculated, thus providing data for the design of GaN devices.

== Developments ==
One of the earliest syntheses of gallium nitride was at the George Herbert Jones Laboratory in 1932. Another early synthesis of gallium nitride was by Robert Juza and Harry Hahn in 1938.

GaN with a high crystalline quality can be obtained by depositing a buffer layer at low temperatures. Such high-quality GaN led to the discovery of p-type GaN, p–n junction blue/UV-LEDs and room-temperature stimulated emission (essential for laser action). This has led to the commercialization of high-performance blue LEDs and long-lifetime violet laser diodes, and to the development of nitride-based devices such as UV detectors and high-speed field-effect transistors.

=== LEDs ===
High-brightness GaN light-emitting diodes (LEDs) completed the range of primary colors, and made possible applications such as daylight-visible full-color LED displays, white LEDs and blue laser devices. The first GaN-based high-brightness LEDs used a thin film of GaN deposited via metalorganic vapour-phase epitaxy (MOVPE) on sapphire. Other substrates used are zinc oxide, with lattice constant mismatch of only 2% and silicon carbide (SiC). Group III nitride semiconductors are, in general, recognized as one of the most promising semiconductor families for fabricating optical devices in the visible short-wavelength and UV region.

=== GaN transistors and power ICs ===
The very high breakdown voltages, high electron mobility, and high saturation velocity of GaN has made it an ideal candidate for high-power and high-temperature microwave applications, as evidenced by its high Johnson's figure of merit. Potential markets for high-power/high-frequency devices based on GaN include microwave radio-frequency power amplifiers (e.g., those used in high-speed wireless data transmission) and high-voltage switching devices for power grids. A potential mass-market application for GaN-based RF transistors is as the microwave source for microwave ovens, replacing the magnetrons currently used. The large band gap means that the performance of GaN transistors is maintained up to higher temperatures (~400 °C) than silicon transistors (~150 °C) because it lessens the effects of thermal generation of charge carriers that are inherent to any semiconductor. The first gallium nitride metal semiconductor field-effect transistors (GaN MESFET) were experimentally demonstrated in 1993 and they are being actively developed.

In 2010, the first enhancement-mode GaN transistors became generally available. Only n-channel transistors were available. These devices were designed to replace power MOSFETs in applications where switching speed or power conversion efficiency is critical. These transistors are built by growing a thin layer of GaN on top of a standard silicon wafer, often referred to as GaN-on-Si by manufacturers. This allows the FETs to maintain costs similar to silicon power MOSFETs but with the superior electrical performance of GaN, and consists of growing GaN on silicon wafers using MOCVD Epitaxy. Another seemingly viable solution for realizing enhancement-mode GaN-channel HFETs is to employ a lattice-matched quaternary AlInGaN layer of acceptably low spontaneous polarization mismatch to GaN.

GaN ICs monolithically integrate a GaN FET, GaN-based drive circuitry and circuit protection into a single surface-mount device. Integration means that the gate-drive loop has essentially zero impedance, which further improves efficiency by virtually eliminating FET turn-off losses. Academic studies into creating low-voltage GaN power ICs began at the Hong Kong University of Science and Technology (HKUST) and the first devices were demonstrated in 2015. Commercial GaN power IC production began in 2018. In October 2023, Infineon Technologies completed its acquisition of GaN Systems for US$830 million, the largest transaction to date in the power-GaN sector.

==== CMOS logic ====
In 2016 the first GaN CMOS logic using PMOS and NMOS transistors was reported with gate lengths of 0.5 μm (gate widths of the PMOS and NMOS transistors were 500 μm and 50 μm, respectively).

== Applications ==
=== LEDs and lasers ===
GaN-based violet laser diodes are used to read Blu-ray Discs. The mixture of GaN with In (InGaN) or Al (AlGaN) with a band gap dependent on the ratio of In or Al to Ga allows the manufacture of light-emitting diodes (LEDs) with colors that can go from red to ultra-violet. The Kyropoulos method is used to grow GaN for these applications.

=== Transistors and power ICs ===
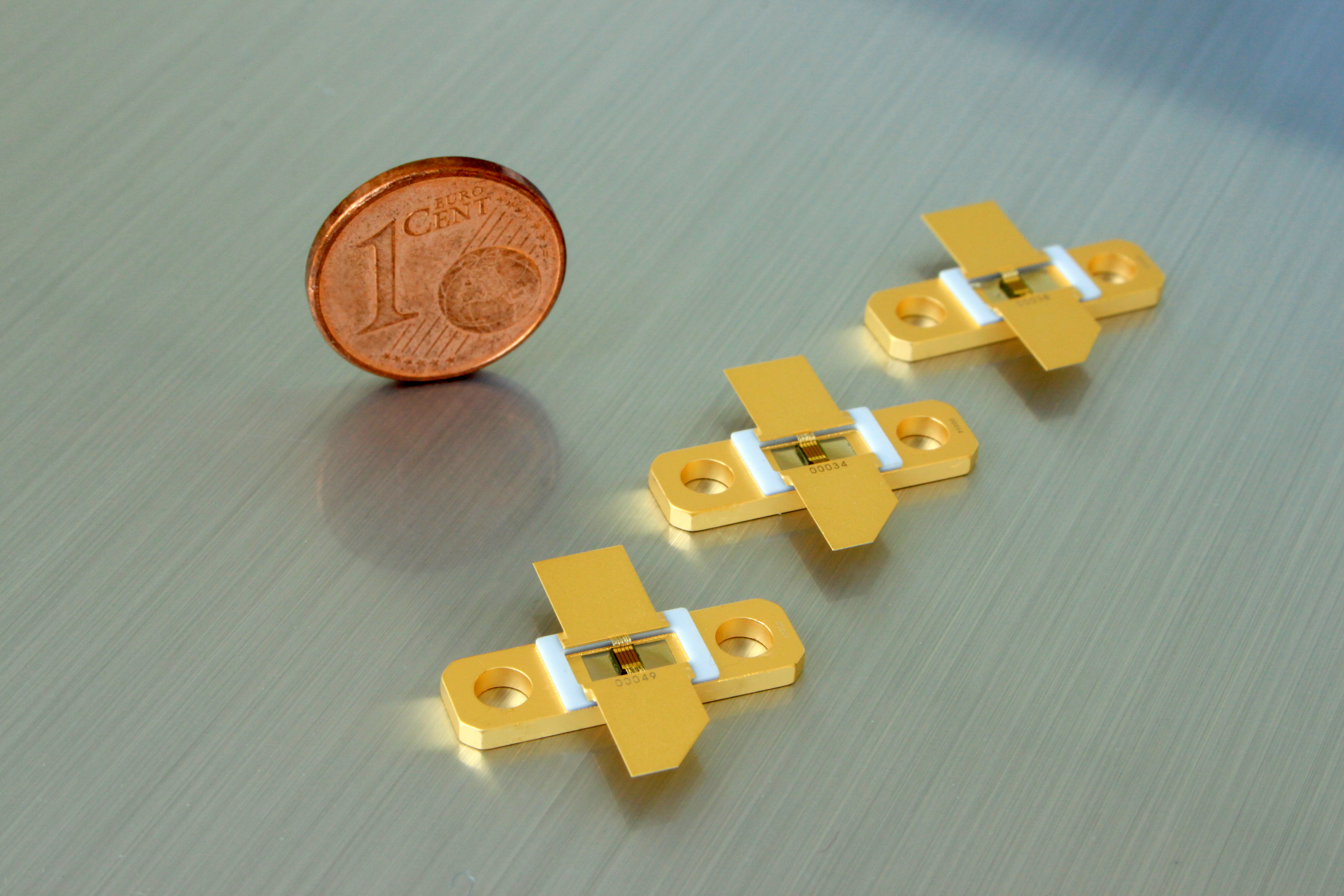
GaN high-electron-mobility transistors (manufactured by Ferdinand-Braun-Institut)

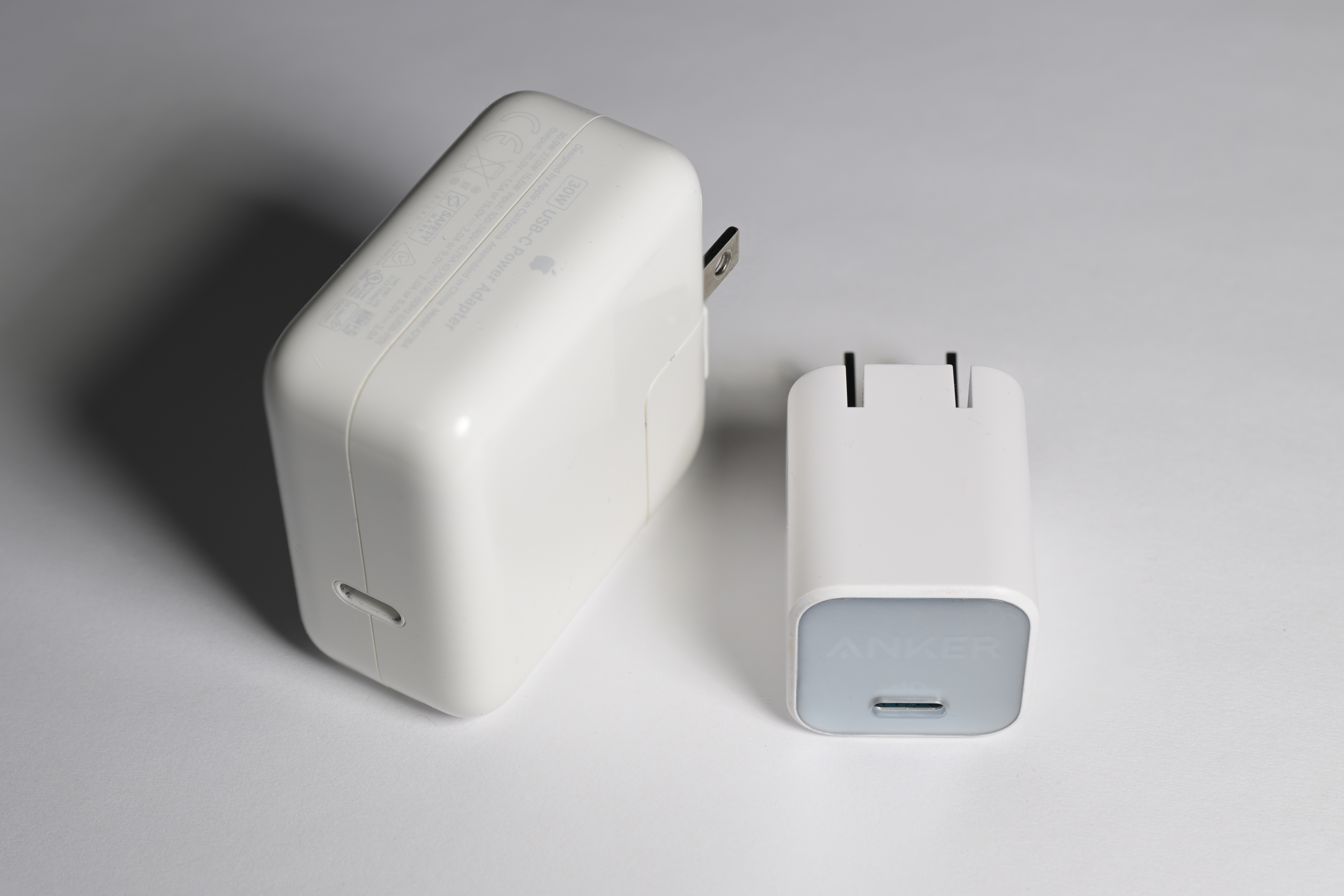
A 30 W GaN USB-PD wall charger (right) is significantly smaller than a traditional silicon-based charger (left) of the same power rating.

GaN transistors are suitable for high frequency, high voltage, high temperature and high-efficiency applications. GaN is efficient at transferring current, and this ultimately means that less energy is lost to heat.

GaN high-electron-mobility transistors (HEMT) have been offered commercially since 2006, and have found immediate use in various wireless infrastructure applications due to their high efficiency and high voltage operation. A second generation of devices with shorter gate lengths will address higher-frequency telecom and aerospace applications.

GaN-based metal–oxide–semiconductor field-effect transistors (MOSFET) and metal–semiconductor field-effect transistors (MESFET) also offer advantages including lower loss in high power electronics, especially in automotive and electric car applications. Since 2008 these can be formed on a silicon substrate. High-voltage (800 V) Schottky barrier diodes (SBDs) have also been made.

The higher efficiency and high power density of integrated GaN power management ICs allows them to reduce the size, weight and component count of applications including mobile and laptop chargers, consumer electronics, computing equipment and electric vehicles.

GaN-based electronics (not pure GaN) have the potential to substantially cut energy consumption, not only in consumer applications but even for power transmission utilities.

Unlike silicon transistors that switch off due to power surges, GaN transistors are typically depletion mode devices (i.e. on / resistive when the gate-source voltage is zero). Several methods have been proposed to reach normally-off (or E-mode) operation, which is necessary for use in power electronics:

- the implantation of fluorine ions under the gate (the negative charge of the F-ions favors the depletion of the channel)
- the use of a MIS-type gate stack, with recess of the AlGaN
- the integration of a cascaded pair constituted by a normally-on GaN transistor and a low voltage silicon MOSFET
- the use of a p-type layer on top of the AlGaN/GaN heterojunction

=== Radars ===
GaN technology is also utilized in military electronics such as active electronically scanned array radars.

Thales Group introduced the Ground Master 400 radar in 2010 utilizing GaN technology. In 2021 Thales put in operation more than 50,000 GaN Transmitters on radar systems.

The U.S. Army funded Lockheed Martin to incorporate GaN active-device technology into the AN/TPQ-53 radar system to replace two medium-range radar systems, the AN/TPQ-36 and the AN/TPQ-37. The AN/TPQ-53 radar system was designed to detect, classify, track, and locate enemy indirect fire systems, as well as unmanned aerial systems. The AN/TPQ-53 radar system provided enhanced performance, greater mobility, increased reliability and supportability, lower life-cycle cost, and reduced crew size compared to the AN/TPQ-36 and the AN/TPQ-37 systems.

Lockheed Martin fielded other tactical operational radars with GaN technology in 2018, including TPS-77 Multi Role Radar System deployed to Latvia and Romania. In 2019, Lockheed Martin's partner ELTA Systems Limited, developed a GaN-based ELM-2084 Multi Mission Radar that was able to detect and track aircraft and ballistic targets, while providing fire control guidance for missile interception or air defense artillery.

On April 8, 2020, Saab flight tested its new GaN designed AESA X-band radar in a JAS-39 Gripen fighter. Saab already offers products with GaN based radars, like the Giraffe radar, Erieye, GlobalEye, and Arexis EW. Saab also delivers major subsystems, assemblies and software for the AN/TPS-80 (G/ATOR)

India's Defence Research and Development Organisation is developing Virupaakhsha radar for Sukhoi Su-30MKI based on GaN technology. The radar is a further development of Uttam AESA Radar for use on HAL Tejas which employs GaAs technology.

Turkish Aselsan company delivered the first GaN-based Turkish AESA radar, ALP 300-G, to the Turkish Armed Forces in May 2024.

=== Nanoscale ===
GaN nanotubes and nanowires are proposed for applications in nanoscale electronics, optoelectronics and biochemical-sensing applications.

=== Spintronics potential ===
When doped with a suitable transition metal such as manganese, GaN is a promising spintronics material (magnetic semiconductors).

== Synthesis ==
=== Bulk substrates ===
GaN crystals can be grown from a molten Na/Ga melt held under 100 atmospheres of pressure of N_{2} at 750 °C. As Ga will not react with N_{2} below 1000 °C, the powder must be made from something more reactive, usually in one of the following ways:

2 Ga + 2 NH_{3} → 2 GaN + 3 H_{2}
Ga_{2}O_{3} + 2 NH_{3} → 2 GaN + 3 H_{2}O

Gallium nitride can also be synthesized by injecting ammonia gas into molten gallium at 900–980 °C at normal atmospheric pressure.

=== Metal-organic vapour phase epitaxy ===
Blue, white and ultraviolet LEDs are grown on industrial scale by metalorganic vapour-phase epitaxy (MOVPE). The precursors are ammonia with either trimethylgallium or triethylgallium, the carrier gas being nitrogen or hydrogen. Growth temperature ranges between 800 and 1100 °C. Introduction of trimethylaluminium and/or trimethylindium is necessary for growing quantum wells and other kinds of heterostructures.

=== Molecular beam epitaxy ===
Commercially, GaN crystals can be grown using molecular beam epitaxy or MBE. MBE growth of GaN can be divided into two categories, including ammonia-MBE (NH_{3}-MBE) and plasma assisted MBE (PA-MBE). In NH_{3}-MBE, NH_{3} is used as the nitrogen source, while a nitrogen RF plasma is used in PA-MBE. This process can be further modified to reduce dislocation densities. First, an ion beam is applied to the growth surface in order to create nanoscale roughness. Then, the surface is polished. This process takes place in a vacuum. Polishing methods typically employ a liquid electrolyte and UV irradiation to enable mechanical removal of a thin oxide layer from the wafer. More recent methods have been developed that utilize solid-state polymer electrolytes that are solvent-free and require no radiation before polishing.

== Safety ==
GaN dust is an irritant to skin, eyes and lungs. The environment, health and safety aspects of gallium nitride sources (such as trimethylgallium and ammonia) and industrial hygiene monitoring studies of MOVPE sources have been reported in a 2004 review.

Bulk GaN is non-toxic and biocompatible. Therefore, it may be used in the electrodes and electronics of implants in living organisms.

== See also ==
- Epitaxy
- Lithium-ion battery
- Molecular-beam epitaxy
- Schottky diode
- Semiconductor devices
