= Michael Kneissl =

German physicist

- Born: 1966 (age 59–60)
- Education: University of Erlangen–Nuremberg
- Known for: Metalorganic vapour-phase epitaxy
- Awards: IEEE Fellow
- Scientific career
- Fields: Solid State Physics
- Workplaces: Technische Universität Berlin; Ferdinand-Braun-Institut; Xerox Palo Alto Research Center (PARC)

Michael Kneissl is a German physicist and professor at the Institute of Solid State Physics at Technische Universität Berlin.

Kneissl received his doctoral degree in physics from the Friedrich-Alexander University of Erlangen–Nuremberg in 1996. During his graduate studies, he was a visiting scholar at the University of California, Berkeley, in 1993. He joined the Xerox Palo Alto Research Center (PARC) in 1996. Since 2005, he has been a Full Professor and the Chair of Experimental Nanophysics & Photonics at the TU Berlin. He holds a joint appointment at the Ferdinand-Braun-Institut in Berlin, where he heads the Joint Lab GaN-Optoelectronics. Excluding a two-year hiatus in 2021 he has served as the Executive Director of the Institute of Solid State Physics at TU Berlin from 2011 to 2025. Since 2021 Kneissl is the Chairman of the Executive Board of the Advanced UV for Life e.V. association and since 2024 spokesperson for the newly established Center for Integrated Photonics Research (CIPHOR) at TU Berlin.

His research interests include group III-nitride semiconductor materials, metalorganic vapour-phase epitaxy of wide-bandgap semiconductors and (In)AlGaN nanostructures as well as novel optoelectronic devices, including UV LEDs and laser diodes.

He was named Fellow of the Institute of Electrical and Electronics Engineers (IEEE) in 2016 for contributions to the development of wide bandgap semiconductor laser diodes and ultraviolet LEDs. He holds more than 60 patents in the area of group III-nitride device technologies.

== Books ==
- with Knorr, Andreas; Reitzenstein, Stephan; Hoffmann, Axel, eds. (2020). Semiconductor Nanophotonics. Springer Series in Solid-State Sciences. Vol. 194. Springer Cham. doi:10.1007/978-3-030-35656-9. ISBN 978-3-030-35655-2. S2CID 242358782.
- with Rass, Jens, ed. (2016). III-Nitride Ultraviolet Emitters. Springer Series in Materials Science. Vol. 227. Springer Cham. doi:10.1007/978-3-319-24100-5. ISBN 978-3-319-24098-5. S2CID 138704361.
