= Dimethylzinc =

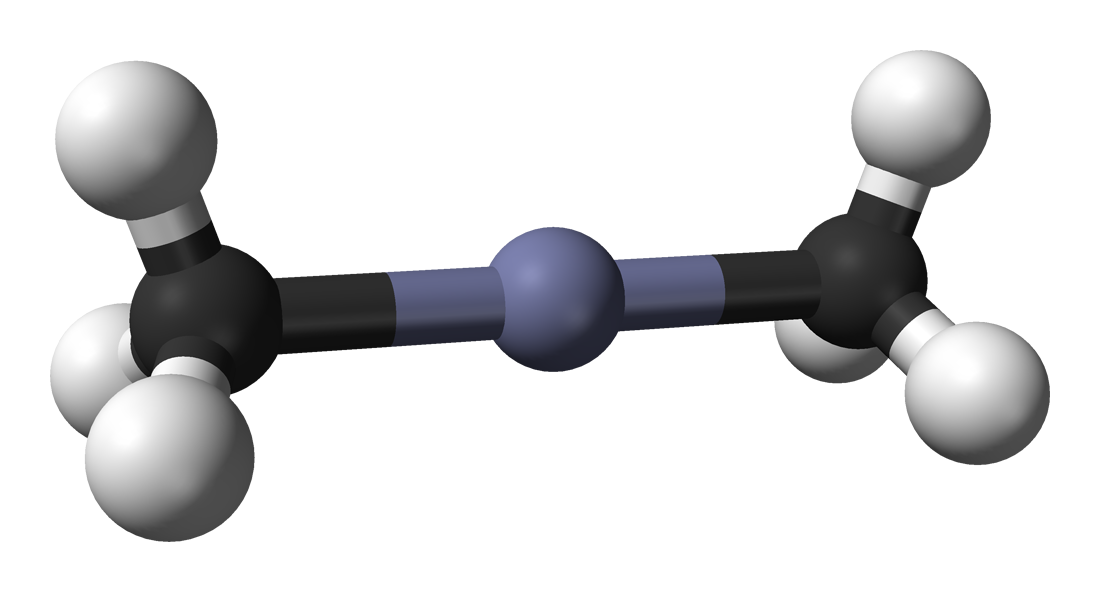
- Ball-and-stick model of dimethylzinc H, C, Zn

Names
- IUPAC name Dimethylzinc
- Other names: 2-Zincapropane; Dimethyl zinc; Dimethylzincane; DMZ; DMZn; Methylzinc; Zinc carbanide; Zinc methanide; Zinc trihydrogen methanide; Zinc methyl; Zinc trihydrogenmethanide

Identifiers
CAS Number	544-97-8
3D model (JSmol)	Interactive image
ChEBI	CHEBI:51497
ChemSpider	10254473
ECHA InfoCard	100.008.077
PubChem CID	11010
UNII	8H6R0N8W2F
CompTox Dashboard (EPA)	DTXSID5060271
- InChI: InChI=1S/2CH3.Zn/h2*1H3; Key: AXAZMDOAUQTMOW-UHFFFAOYSA-N; InChI=1/2CH3.Zn/h2*1H3;/rC2H6Zn/c1-3-2/h1-2H3 Key: AXAZMDOAUQTMOW-WPFVDKAYAX
- SMILES: C[Zn]C

Properties
Chemical formula	Zn(CH_{3})_{2}
Molar mass	95.478 g/mol
Appearance	Colorless liquid
Odor	Garlic
Density	1.386 g/cm^{3} at 10.5 °C
Melting point	−42 °C (−44 °F; 231 K)
Boiling point	46 °C (115 °F; 319 K)
Solubility	Soluble in xylene, diethyl ether, hydrocarbons; decomposes in water, ethanol and acids
Vapor pressure	50.13 kPa
Thermal conductivity	0.1627 W/(m∙K) at 70 °C (158 °F)
Viscosity	0.807 mPa·s at 70 °F (21 °C)

Thermochemistry
Heat capacity (C)	129.20 J/(mol∙K) (liquid at 25 °C (77 °F))

Hazards
- Occupational safety and health (OHS/OSH)
Main hazards	Spontaneously ignites in air and violently reacts with water, evolving irritant and toxic fumes.
- GHS labelling
Pictograms	(GHS02: Flammable) (GHS05: Corrosive) (GHS09: Environmental hazard)
Signal word	Danger
Hazard statements	H225, H250, H260, H314, H410
Precautionary statements	P210, P222, P223, P231+P232, P233, P235, P240, P241, P242, P243, P260, P264, P273, P280, P301+P330+P331, P302, P303+P361+P353, P304+P340, P305, P316, P317, P321, P334, P335, P338, P361, P363, P370+P378, P391, P402+P404, P403, P405, P501
NFPA 704 (fire diamond)	3 4 3 W
Autoignition temperature	0 °F (−18 °C)

Related compounds
Related compounds	Diethylzinc; Diphenylzinc; Dimethylcadmium; Dimethylmercury; Dimethylmagnesium
- Except where otherwise noted, data are given for materials in their standard state (at 25 °C [77 °F], 100 kPa). verify (what is ?) Infobox references

Dimethylzinc, also known as zinc methyl, DMZ, or DMZn, is a toxic organozinc compound with the chemical formula Zn(CH_{3})_{2}. It belongs to the large series of similar compounds such as diethylzinc.

== Preparation ==
It is formed by the action of methyl iodide on zinc or zinc-sodium alloy at elevated temperatures.

2 Zn + 2 CH_{3}I → Zn(CH_{3})_{2} + ZnI_{2}

Sodium assists the reaction of the zinc with the methyl iodide. Zinc iodide is formed as a byproduct.

== Properties ==
Dimethylzinc is a colorless mobile volatile liquid, which has a characteristic disagreeable garlic-like odor. It is a very reactive and strong reducing agent. It is soluble in alkanes and often sold as a solution in hexanes. The triple point of dimethylzinc is 230.13 K (−43.02 °C) ± 0.02 K. The monomeric molecule of dimethylzinc is linear at Zn center and tetragonal at C centers.

== Structure ==
In the solid state the compound exists in two modifications. The tetragonal high-temperature phase shows a two-dimensional disorder, while the low-temperature phase which is monoclinic is ordered. The molecules are linear with Zn-C bond lengths measuring 192.7(6) pm. The structure of the gas-phase shows a very similar Zn-C distance of 193.0(2) pm.

== History ==
Dimethylzinc was first prepared by Edward Frankland during his work with Robert Bunsen in 1849 at the University of Marburg. After heating a mixture of zinc and methyl iodide in an airtight vessel, a flame burst out when the seal was broken. In the laboratory, this synthesis method remains unchanged today, except that copper or copper compounds are used to activate the zinc.

== Uses ==
Dimethylzinc has been of great importance in the synthesis of organic compounds. It was used for a long time to introduce methyl groups into organic molecules or to synthesize organometallic compounds containing methyl groups. Grignard reagents, (organo-magnesium compounds), which are easier to handle and less flammable, replaced organo-zinc compounds in most laboratory syntheses. Due to differences in reactivity (as well as in reaction byproducts) between organo-zinc compounds and Grignard reagents, organo-zinc compounds may be preferred in some syntheses.

Its high vapor pressure has led to extensive uses in the production of semiconductors, e.g. metalorganic chemical vapor deposition (MOCVD) for the preparation of wide band gap II–VI semiconducting films (e.g. ZnO, ZnS, ZnSe, ZnTe, Cd_{x}Hg_{1−x}Te) and as p-dopant precursors for III–V semiconductors (e.g. AlN, AlP, Al_{x}Ga_{1−x}As, GaAs, InP), which have many electronic and photonic applications.

It is used as an accelerator in rubber vulcanization, as a fungicide, and as a methylating agent in methyltitanium trichloride.

== Toxicity and hazards ==
Inhalation of dimethylzinc mist or vapor causes immediate irritation of the upper respiratory tract, and may cause pneumonia and death. Eyes are immediately and severely irritated and burned by liquid, vapor, or dilute solutions. If not removed by thorough flushing with water, this chemical may permanently damage the cornea, eventually causing blindness. If dimethylzinc contacts the skin, it causes thermal and acid burns by reacting with moisture on skin. Unless washed quickly, skin may be scarred. Ingestion, while unlikely, also causes immediate burns. Nausea, vomiting, cramps, and diarrhea may follow, and tissues may ulcerate if not promptly treated. Upon heating, dimethylzinc vapor decomposes to irritating and toxic products.

Contact of dimethylzinc with oxidants may form explosive peroxides. Dimethylzinc oxidises in air very slowly, producing methylzinc methoxide CH_{3}ZnOCH_{3}.

Dimethylzinc is very pyrophoric and can spontaneously ignite in air. It burns in air with a blue flame, giving off a garlic-like odor. The products of decomposition (fire smoke) include zinc oxide, which itself is not toxic, but its fumes can irritate lungs and cause metal fume fever, severe injury, or death.

Dimethylzinc fire must be extinguished with dry sand. The fire reacts violently or explosively with water, generating very flammable methane gas which can explode in air upon catching fire, and lung-irritating smoke of zinc oxide. Dimethylzinc fire reacts violently or explosively with methanol, ethanol and 2,2-dichloropropane. It explodes in oxygen and ozone. Improperly handled containers of dimethylzinc can explode, causing serious injuries or death.
