= Kneissl (surname) =

Kneißl or Kneissl is a German-language surname. It may refer to:

- Franz Kneissl (1921–1994), Austrian bobsledder
- Karin Kneissl (1965), Austrian diplomat, journalist and independent politician
- Mathias Kneißl (1875–1902), German outlaw, poacher and popular social rebel
- Michael Kneissl (1966), German physicist
- Sebastian Kneißl (1983), German former professional footballer
