= Chemically inert =

Substance that is not chemically reactive

In chemistry, the term chemically inert is used to describe a substance that is not chemically reactive. From a thermodynamic perspective, a substance is inert, or nonlabile, if it is thermodynamically unstable (negative standard Gibbs free energy of formation) yet decomposes at a slow, or negligible rate.

Most of the noble gases, which appear in the last column of the periodic table, are classified as inert (or unreactive). These elements are stable in their naturally occurring form (gaseous form) and they are called inert gases.

== Noble gas ==
The noble gases (helium, neon, argon, krypton, xenon, radon, and—in some cases—oganesson) were previously known as inert gases because of their perceived lack of chemical reactivity. This belief was invariably given credence by these elements possessing a complete valence electron shell and thus are disinclined from altering their current electron configuration per the octet 'rule'.

It has now been experimentally shown under specific conditions that all of these gases, except oganesson, can react to form chemical compounds, such as xenon tetrafluoride. However, a large amount of energy is required to drive such reactions, usually in the form of heat, pressure, or radiation, often assisted by catalysts.

== Inert gas ==
The term inert may also be applied in a relative sense. For example, molecular nitrogen is an inert gas under ordinary conditions, existing as diatomic molecules, N_{2}. The presence of a strong triple covalent bond in the N_{2} molecule renders it unreactive under normal circumstances. Nevertheless, nitrogen gas does react with the alkali metal lithium to form compound lithium nitride (Li_{3}N), even under ordinary conditions. Under high pressures and temperatures and with the right catalysts, nitrogen becomes more reactive; the Haber process uses such conditions to produce ammonia from atmospheric nitrogen.

=== Main uses ===
Inert atmospheres consisting of gases such as argon, nitrogen, or helium are commonly used in chemical reaction chambers and in storage containers for oxygen- or water-sensitive substances, to prevent unwanted reactions of these substances with oxygen or water.

Argon is widely used in fluorescence tubes and low energy light bulbs. Argon gas helps to protect the metal filament inside the bulb from reacting with oxygen and corroding the filament under high temperature.

Neon is used in making advertising signs. Neon gas in a vacuum tube glows bright red in colour when electricity is passed through. Different coloured neon lights can also be made by using other gases.

Helium gas is used in cryogenics, welding, and rocketry, among other uses. It is also used to fill blimps, scientific balloons, and party balloons. Balloons filled with it float upwards as helium gas is less dense than air.

== See also ==
- Noble metal
