= Metalorganic vapour-phase epitaxy =

Method of producing thin films (polycrystalline and single crystal)

Illustration of the process

Metalorganic vapour-phase epitaxy (MOVPE), also known as organometallic vapour-phase epitaxy (OMVPE) or metalorganic chemical vapour deposition (MOCVD), is a chemical vapour deposition method used to produce single- or polycrystalline thin films. It is a process for growing crystalline layers to create complex semiconductor multilayer structures. In contrast to molecular-beam epitaxy (MBE), the growth of crystals is by chemical reaction and not physical deposition. This takes place not in vacuum, but from the gas phase at moderate pressures (10 to 760 Torr). As such, this technique is preferred for the formation of devices incorporating thermodynamically metastable alloys, and it has become a major process in the manufacture of optoelectronics, such as light-emitting diodes, its most widespread application. It was first demonstrated in 1967 at North American Aviation (later Rockwell International) Autonetics Division in Anaheim CA by Harold M. Manasevit.

== Basic principles ==
In MOCVD ultrapure precursor gases are injected into a reactor, usually with a non-reactive carrier gas. For a III-V semiconductor, a metalorganic could be used as the group III precursor and a hydride for the group V precursor. For example, indium phosphide can be grown with trimethylindium ((CH_{3})_{3}In) and phosphine (PH_{3}) precursors.

As the precursors approach the semiconductor wafer, they undergo pyrolysis and the subspecies absorb onto the semiconductor wafer surface. Surface reaction of the precursor subspecies results in the incorporation of elements into a new epitaxial layer of the semiconductor crystal lattice. In the mass-transport-limited growth regime in which MOCVD reactors typically operate, growth is driven by supersaturation of chemical species in the vapor phase. MOCVD can grow films containing combinations of group III and group V, group II and group VI, group IV.

Required pyrolysis temperature increases with increasing chemical bond strength of the precursor. The more carbon atoms are attached to the central metal atom, the weaker the bond. The diffusion of atoms on the substrate surface is affected by atomic steps on the surface.

The vapor pressure of the group III metal organic source is an important control parameter for MOCVD growth, since it determines the growth rate in the mass-transport-limited regime.

== Reactor components ==
MOCVD apparatus

In the metal organic chemical vapor deposition (MOCVD) technique, reactant gases are combined at elevated temperatures in the reactor to cause a chemical interaction, resulting in the deposition of materials on the substrate.

A reactor is a chamber made of a material that does not react with the chemicals being used. It must also withstand high temperatures. This chamber is composed by reactor walls, liner, a susceptor, gas injection units, and temperature control units. Usually, the reactor walls are made from stainless steel or quartz. Ceramic or special glasses, such as quartz, are often used as the liner in the reactor chamber between the reactor wall and the susceptor. To prevent overheating, cooling water must be flowing through the channels within the reactor walls. A substrate sits on a susceptor which is at a controlled temperature. The susceptor is made from a material resistant to the temperature and metalorganic compounds used, often it is machined from graphite. For growing nitrides and related materials, a special coating, typically of silicon nitride or tantalum carbide, on the graphite susceptor is necessary to prevent corrosion by ammonia (NH_{3}) gas.

One type of reactor used to carry out MOCVD is a cold-wall reactor. In a cold-wall reactor, the substrate is supported by a pedestal, which also acts as a susceptor. The pedestal/susceptor is the primary origin of heat energy in the reaction chamber. Only the susceptor is heated, so gases do not react before they reach the hot wafer surface. The pedestal/susceptor is made of a radiation-absorbing material such as carbon. In contrast, the walls of the reaction chamber in a cold-wall reactor are typically made of quartz which is largely transparent to the electromagnetic radiation. The reaction chamber walls in a cold-wall reactor, however, may be indirectly heated by heat radiating from the hot pedestal/susceptor, but will remain cooler than the pedestal/susceptor and the substrate the pedestal/susceptor supports.

In hot-wall CVD, the entire chamber is heated. This may be necessary for some gases to be pre-cracked before reaching the wafer surface to allow them to stick to the wafer.

=== Gas inlet and switching system ===
Gas is introduced via devices known as 'bubblers'. In a bubbler a carrier gas (usually hydrogen in arsenide & phosphide growth or nitrogen for nitride growth) is bubbled through the metalorganic liquid, which picks up some metalorganic vapour and transports it to the reactor. The amount of metalorganic vapour transported depends on the rate of carrier gas flow and the bubbler temperature/pressure, and is usually controlled automatically and most accurately by using an ultrasonic concentration measuring feedback gas control system. Allowance must be made for saturated vapors.

=== Pressure maintenance system ===
Gas exhaust and cleaning system. Toxic waste products must be converted to liquid or solid wastes for recycling (preferably) or disposal. Ideally processes will be designed to minimize the production of waste products.

== Organometallic precursors ==
- Aluminium
  - Trimethylaluminium (TMA or TMAl), liquid
  - Triethylaluminium (TEA or TEAl), liquid
- Gallium
  - Trimethylgallium (TMG or TMGa), liquid
  - Triethylgallium (TEG or TEGa), liquid
- Indium
  - Trimethylindium (TMI or TMIn), solid
  - Triethylindium (TEI or TEIn), liquid
  - Di-isopropylmethylindium (DIPMeIn), liquid
  - Ethyldimethylindium (EDMIn), liquid
- Germanium
  - Isobutylgermane (IBGe), liquid
  - Dimethylamino germanium trichloride (DiMAGeC), liquid
  - Tetramethylgermane (TMGe), liquid
  - Tetraethylgermanium(TEGe), liquid
  - Germane GeH_{4}, gas
- Nitrogen
  - Phenyl hydrazine, liquid
  - Dimethylhydrazine (DMHy), liquid
  - Tertiarybutylamine (TBAm), liquid
  - Ammonia NH_{3}, gas
- Phosphorus
  - Phosphine PH_{3}, gas
  - Tertiarybutyl phosphine (TBP), liquid
  - Bisphosphinoethane (BPE), liquid
- Arsenic
  - Arsine AsH_{3}, gas
  - Tertiarybutyl arsine (TBAs), liquid
  - Monoethyl arsine (MEAs), liquid
  - Trimethyl arsine (TMAs), liquid
- Antimony
  - Trimethyl antimony (TMSb), liquid
  - Triethyl antimony (TESb), liquid
  - Tri-isopropyl antimony (TIPSb), liquid
  - Stibine SbH_{3}, gas
- Cadmium
  - Dimethyl cadmium (DMCd), liquid
  - Diethyl cadmium (DECd), liquid
  - Methyl Allyl Cadmium (MACd), liquid
- Tellurium
  - Dimethyl telluride (DMTe), liquid
  - Diethyl telluride (DETe), liquid
  - Di-isopropyl telluride (DIPTe), liquid
- Titanium
  - Alkoxides, such as titanium isopropoxide or titanium ethoxide
- Selenium
  - Dimethyl selenide (DMSe), liquid
  - Diethyl selenide (DESe), liquid
  - Di-isopropyl selenide (DIPSe), liquid
  - Di-tert-butyl selenide (DTBSe), liquid
- Zinc
  - Dimethylzinc (DMZ), liquid
  - Diethylzinc (DEZ), liquid

== Semiconductors grown by MOCVD ==
=== III-V semiconductors ===
- AlN
- AlP
- AlGaN
- AlGaP
- AlGaAs
- AlGaSb
- AlGaInP
- AlInSb
- GaSb
- GaAsP
- GaAsSb
- GaAs
- GaN
- GaP
- InAlAs
- InAlP
- InSb
- InGaSb
- InGaN
- GaInAlAs
- GaInAlN
- GaInAsN
- GaInAsP
- GaInAs
- GaInP
- InN
- InP
- InAs
- InAsSb
- AlInN

=== II-VI semiconductors ===
- ZnO
- ZnS
- ZnSe
- ZnTe
- CdO
- Cd_{x}Hg_{1−x}Te

=== IV semiconductors ===
- Si
- Ge
- Strained silicon

=== IV-V-VI semiconductors ===
- GeSbTe

=== Environment, health and safety ===
As MOCVD has become well-established production technology, there are equally growing concerns associated with its bearing on personnel and community safety, environmental impact and maximum quantities of hazardous materials (such as gases and metalorganics) permissible in the device fabrication operations. The safety as well as responsible environmental care have become major factors of paramount importance in the MOCVD-based crystal growth of compound semiconductors. As the application of this technique in industry has grown, a number of companies have also grown and evolved over the years to provide the ancillary equipment required to reduce risk. This equipment includes but is not limited to computer automated gas and chemical delivery systems, toxic and carrier gas sniffing sensors which can detect single digit ppb amounts of gas, and of course abatement equipment to fully capture toxic materials which can be present in the growth of arsenic containing alloys such as GaAs and InGaAsP.

== See also ==
- Atomic layer deposition
- Hydrogen purifier
- List of semiconductor materials
- Metalorganics
- Molecular beam epitaxy
- Thin-film deposition
