= Trimethylaluminium =

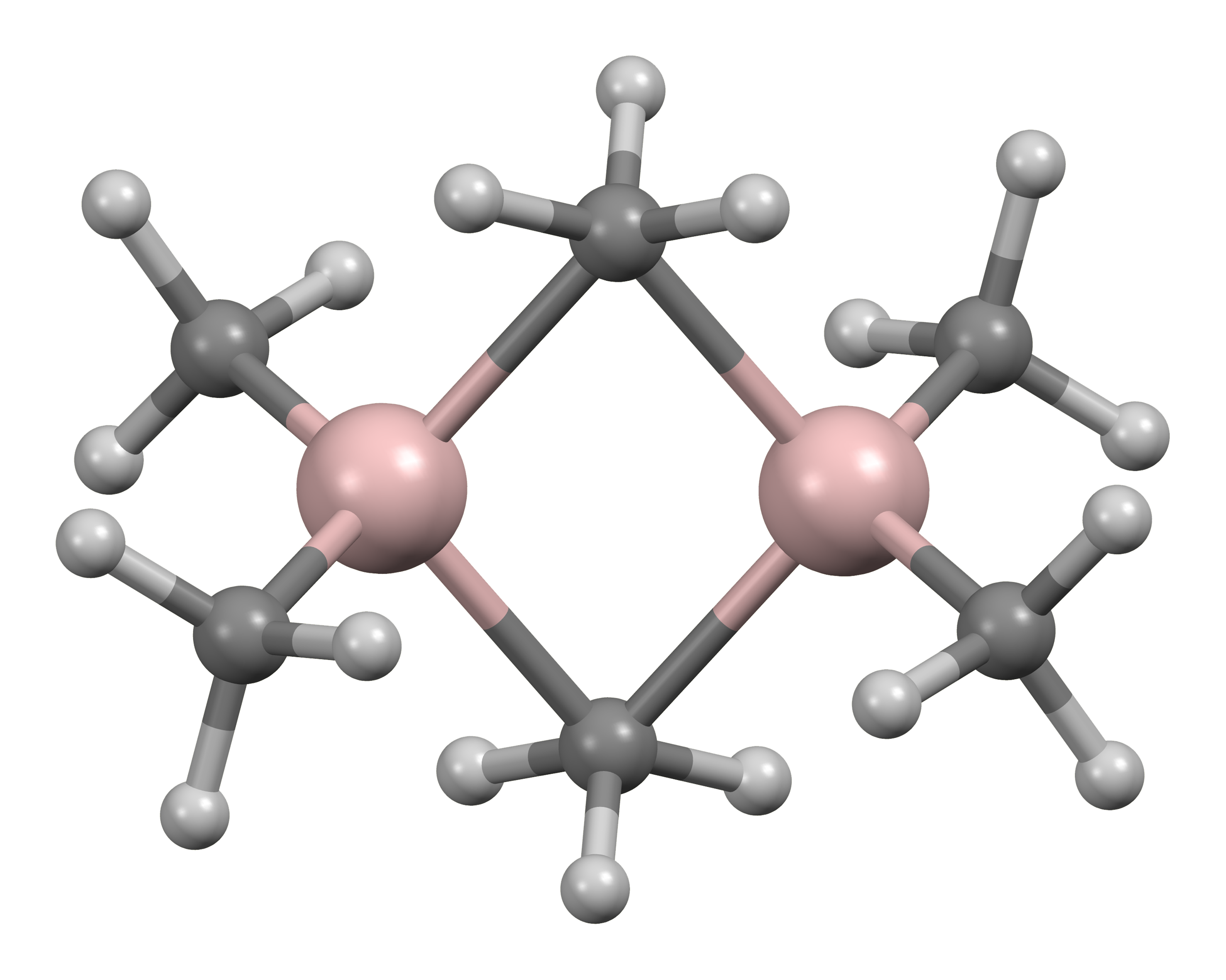
- Al, C, H

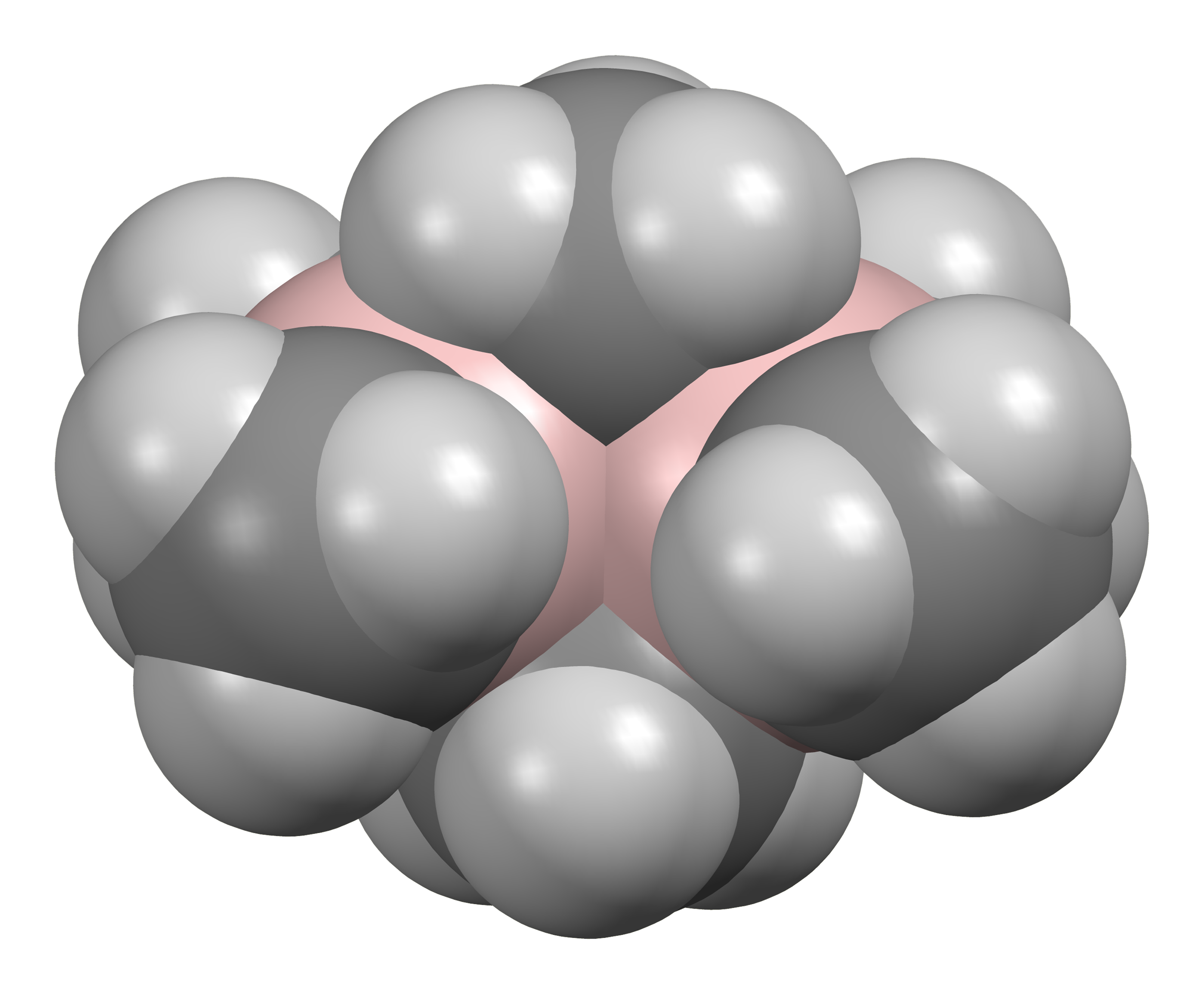

Names
- IUPAC name Trimethylalumane
- Other names: Trimethylaluminum; Aluminium trimethyl; Aluminum trimethyl

Identifiers
CAS Number	75-24-1
3D model (JSmol)	dimer: Interactive image; monomer: Interactive image
Abbreviations	TMA; TMAl; AlMe_{3} Al_{2}Me_{6}
ChemSpider	10606585
ECHA InfoCard	100.000.776
PubChem CID	16682925
UNII	AV210LG46J
CompTox Dashboard (EPA)	DTXSID9058787
- InChI: InChI=1S/3CH3.Al/h3*1H3; Key: JLTRXTDYQLMHGR-UHFFFAOYSA-N; InChI=1/3CH3.Al/h3*1H3;/rC3H9Al/c1-4(2)3/h1-3H3 Key: JLTRXTDYQLMHGR-MZZUXTGEAJ
- SMILES: dimer: C[Al-](C)([CH3+]1)[CH3+][Al-]1(C)C; monomer: C[Al](C)C

Properties
Chemical formula	Al_{2}(CH_{3})_{6}
Molar mass	144.17 g/mol 72.09 g/mol (Al(CH_{3})_{3})
Appearance	Colorless liquid
Density	0.752 g/cm^{3} (20 °C)
Melting point	15.4 °C (59.7 °F; 288.5 K)
Boiling point	125–130 °C (257–266 °F; 398–403 K)
Solubility in water	Reacts
Vapor pressure	1.2 kPa (20 °C); 9.24 kPa (60 °C)
Viscosity	1.12 cP (20 °C); 0.9 cP (30 °C)

Thermochemistry
Heat capacity (C)	155.6 J/(mol·K)
Std molar entropy (S^{⦵}_{298})	209.4 J/(mol·K)
Std enthalpy of formation (Δ_{f}H^{⦵}_{298})	−136.4 kJ/mol
Gibbs free energy (Δ_{f}G^{⦵})	−9.9 kJ/mol

Hazards
- Occupational safety and health (OHS/OSH)
Main hazards	Pyrophoric, severe skin burns and eye damage
- GHS labelling
Pictograms	(GHS02: Flammable) (GHS05: Corrosive)
Signal word	Danger
Hazard statements	H250, H260, H314
Precautionary statements	P222, P223, P231+P232, P280, P370+P378, P422
NFPA 704 (fire diamond)	3 4 3 W
Flash point	−17.0 °C (1.4 °F; 256.1 K)

Related compounds
Related compounds	Triethylaluminium; Trimethylborane; Trimethylgallium; Trimethylindium
- Except where otherwise noted, data are given for materials in their standard state (at 25 °C [77 °F], 100 kPa). verify (what is ?) Infobox references

Trimethylaluminium or TMA is one of the simplest examples of an organoaluminium compound. Despite its name it has the formula Al_{2}(CH_{3})_{6} (abbreviated as Al_{2}Me_{6}, where Me stands for methyl), as it exists as a dimer. This colorless liquid is pyrophoric. It is an industrially important compound, closely related to triethylaluminium.

== Structure and bonding ==
The structure and bonding in Al_{2}R_{6} and diborane are analogous (R = alkyl). In Al_{2}Me_{6}, the Al-C(terminal) and Al-C(bridging) distances are 1.97 and 2.14 Å, respectively. The Al center is tetrahedral. The carbon atoms of the bridging methyl groups are each surrounded by five neighbors: three hydrogen atoms and two aluminium atoms. The methyl groups interchange readily intramolecularly. At higher temperatures, the dimer Al_{2}Me_{6} cracks into monomeric AlMe_{3}.

== Synthesis ==
TMA is prepared via a two-step process that can be summarized as follows:

2 Al + 6 CH_{3}Cl + 6 Na → Al_{2}(CH_{3})_{6} + 6 NaCl

== Applications ==
=== Catalysis ===
Starting with the invention of Ziegler-Natta catalysis, organoaluminium compounds have a prominent role in the production of polyolefins, such as polyethylene and polypropylene. Methylaluminoxane, which is produced from TMA, is an activator for many transition metal catalysts.

=== Semiconductor applications ===
TMA is also used in semiconductor fabrication to deposit thin film, high-k dielectrics such as Al_{2}O_{3} via the processes of chemical vapor deposition or atomic layer deposition. TMA is the preferred precursor for metalorganic vapour phase epitaxy (MOVPE) of aluminium-containing compound semiconductors, such as AlAs, AlN, AlP, AlSb, AlGaAs, AlInGaAs, AlInGaP, AlGaN, AlInGaN, AlInGaNP, etc. Criteria for TMA quality focus on (a) elemental impurities, (b) oxygenated and organic impurities.

=== Photovoltaic applications ===
In deposition processes very similar to semiconductor processing, TMA is used to deposit thin film, low-k (non-absorbing) dielectric layer stacks with Al_{2}O_{3} via the processes of chemical vapor deposition or atomic layer deposition. The Al_{2}O_{3} provides excellent surface passivation of p-doped silicon surfaces. The Al_{2}O_{3} layer is typically the bottom layer with multiple silicon nitride (Si_{x}N_{y}) layers for capping.

== Reactions ==
=== Hydrolysis and related protonolysis reactions ===
Trimethylaluminium is hydrolyzed readily, even dangerously:

Al_{2}Me_{6} + 3 H_{2}O → Al_{2}O_{3} + 6 CH_{4}

Under controlled conditions, the reaction can be stopped to give methylaluminoxane:

AlMe_{3} + H_{2}O → 1/n [AlMeO]_{n} + 2 CH_{4}

Alcoholysis and aminolysis reactions proceed comparably. For example, dimethylamine gives the dialuminium diamide dimer:

2 AlMe_{3} + 2 HNMe_{2} → [AlMe_{2}NMe_{2}]_{2} + 2 CH_{4}

=== Reactions with metal chlorides ===
TMA reacts with many metal halides to install alkyl groups. When combined with gallium trichloride, it gives trimethylgallium. Al_{2}Me_{6} reacts with aluminium trichloride to give (AlMe_{2}Cl)_{2}.

TMA/metal halide reactions have emerged as reagents in organic synthesis. Tebbe's reagent, which is used for the methylenation of esters and ketones, is prepared from TMA and titanocene dichloride. In combination with 20 to 100 mol % Cp_{2}ZrCl_{2} (zirconocene dichloride), the (CH_{3})_{2}Al−CH_{3} adds "across" alkynes to give vinyl aluminium species that are useful in organic synthesis in a reaction known as carboalumination.

=== Adducts ===
As for other "electron-deficient" compounds, trimethylaluminium gives adducts R_{3}N·AlMe_{3}. The Lewis acid properties of AlMe_{3} have been quantified. The enthalpy data show that AlMe_{3} is a hard acid and its acid parameters in the ECW model are E_{A} = 8.66 and C_{A} = 3.68.

These adducts, e.g. the complex with the tertiary amine DABCO, are safer to handle than TMA itself.

The NASA ATREX mission (Anomalous Transport Rocket Experiment) employed the white smoke that TMA forms on air contact to study the high altitude jet stream.

=== Synthetic reagent ===
TMA is a source of methyl nucleophiles, akin to methyl lithium, but less reactive. It reacts with ketones to give, after a hydrolytic workup, tertiary alcohols.

== Safety ==
Trimethylaluminium is pyrophoric, reacting violently with air and water, releasing gases which can spontaneously ignite. Violent reactions are also possible with acids, oxygen, alcohols, halogens and oxidizing agents. It may cause severe skin burns and serious eye damage.
