= Trimethylindium =

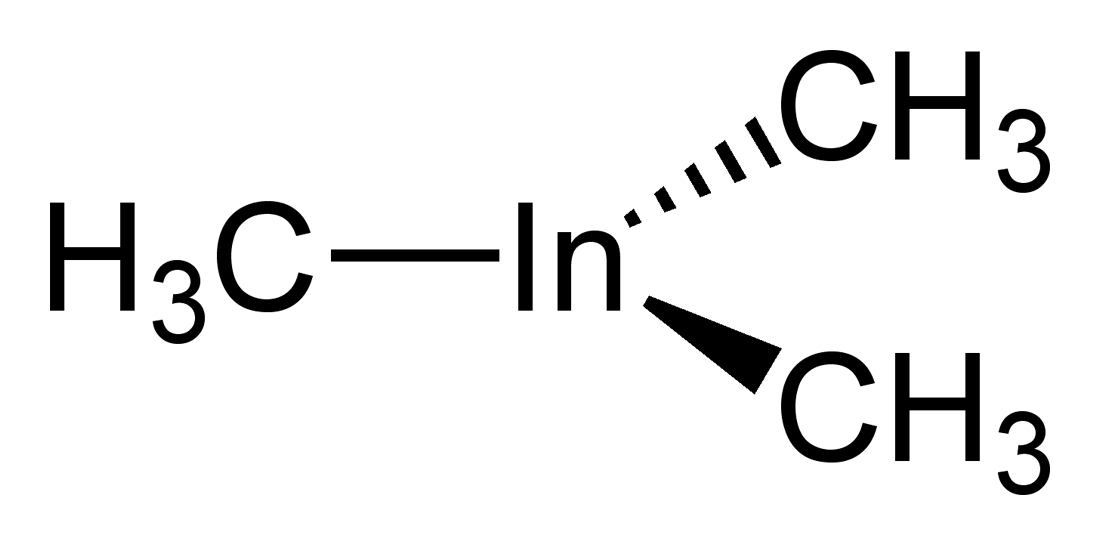
- Stereo, skeletal formula of trimethylindium with all implicit hydrogens shown

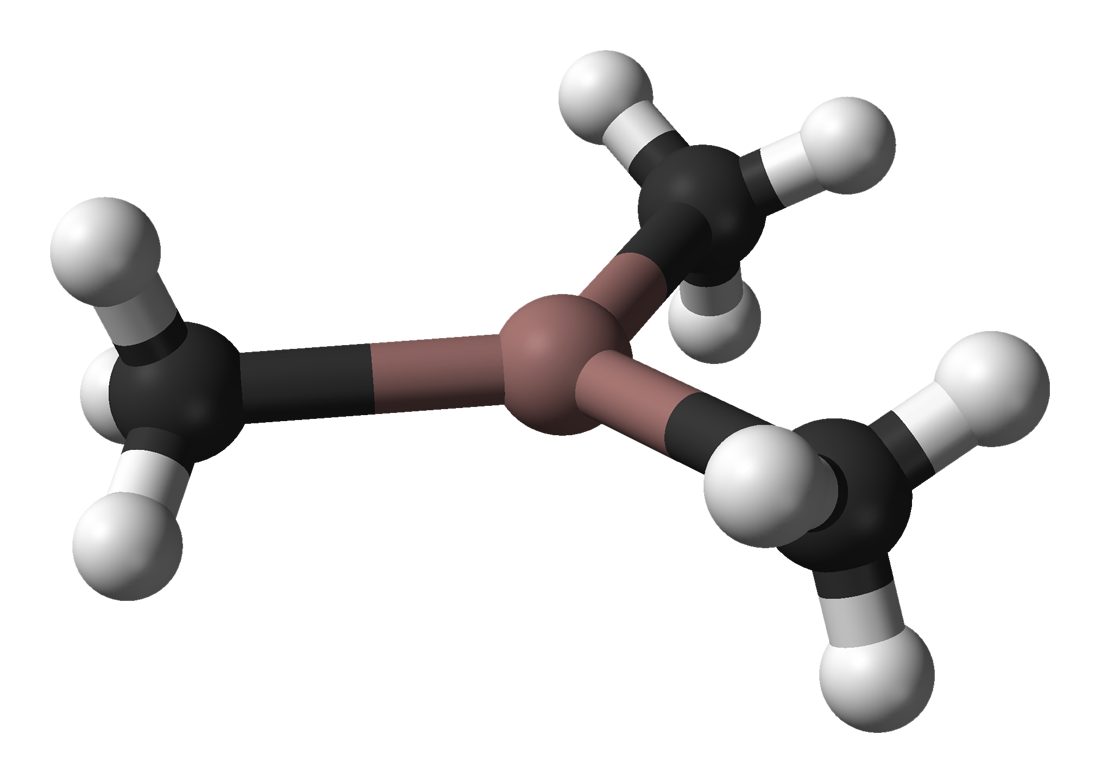
- Ball and stick model of trimethylindium

Names
- Preferred IUPAC name Trimethylindium
- Systematic IUPAC name Trimethylindigane
- Other names Trimethylindane, indium trimethyl

Identifiers
CAS Number	3385-78-2
3D model (JSmol)	Interactive image
ChemSpider	69370
ECHA InfoCard	100.020.183
EC Number	222-200-9
PubChem CID	76919
UNII	WR722GMA7H
CompTox Dashboard (EPA)	DTXSID90187490
- InChI: InChI=1S/3CH3.In/h3*1H3; Key: IBEFSUTVZWZJEL-UHFFFAOYSA-N; InChI=1/3CH3.In/h3*1H3;/rC3H9In/c1-4(2)3/h1-3H3 Key: IBEFSUTVZWZJEL-SGQDGSKVAB
- SMILES: C[In](C)C

Properties
Chemical formula	InC_{3}H_{9}
Molar mass	159.922 g mol^{−1}
Appearance	White, opaque crystals
Density	1.568 g cm^{−3} (at 20 °C)
Melting point	88 °C (190 °F; 361 K)
Boiling point	134 °C (273 °F; 407 K) (decomposes above 101 °C (214 °F; 374 K))
Solubility in water	Reacts

Thermochemistry
Std enthalpy of formation (Δ_{f}H^{⦵}_{298})	150.5-169.7 kJ mol^{−1}

Hazards
- Occupational safety and health (OHS/OSH)
Main hazards	Pyrophoric
- GHS labelling
Pictograms	(GHS02: Flammable) (GHS05: Corrosive)
Signal word	Danger
Hazard statements	H250, H260, H261, H314
Precautionary statements	P210, P222, P223, P231+P232, P260, P264, P280, P301+P330+P331, P302+P334, P303+P361+P353, P304+P340, P305+P351+P338, P310, P321, P335+P334, P363, P370+P378, P402+P404, P405, P422, P501

Related compounds
Related compounds	Triethylindium; Trimethylborane; Trimethylaluminium; Trimethylgallium
- Except where otherwise noted, data are given for materials in their standard state (at 25 °C [77 °F], 100 kPa). verify (what is ?) Infobox references

Trimethylindium, often abbreviated to TMI or TMIn, is the organoindium compound with the formula In(CH_{3})_{3}. It is a colorless, pyrophoric solid. Unlike trimethylaluminium, but akin to trimethylgallium, TMI is monomeric.

== Preparation ==
TMI is prepared by the reaction of indium trichloride with methyl lithium.

InCl_{3} + 3 LiMe → Me_{3}In^{.}OEt_{2} + 3 LiCl

== Properties ==
Compared to trimethylaluminium and trimethylgallium, InMe_{3} is a weaker Lewis acid. It forms adducts with secondary amines and phosphines. A complex with the heterocyclic triazine ligand (Pr^{i}NCH_{2})_{3} forms a complex with 6-coordinate In, where the C-In-C angles are 114°-117° with three long bonds to the tridentate ligand with N-In-N angles of 48.6° and long In-N bonds of 278 pm.

== Structure ==
In the gaseous state InMe_{3} is monomeric, with a trigonal planar structure, and in benzene solution it is tetrameric. In the solid state there are two polymorphs, a tetragonal phase which is obtained, for example, by sublimation and a lower density rhombohedral phase discovered in 2005, when InMe_{3} re-crystallised from hexane solution.

In the tetragonal form InMe_{3} is tetrameric as in benzene solution and there is bridging between tetramers to give an infinite network. Each indium atom is five coordinate, in a distorted trigonal planar configuration, the three shortest bonds (ca. 216 pm) are those in the equatorial plane, with longer axial bonds, 308 pm for the In-C bonds joining the InMe_{3} units to form the tetramers and 356 pm for the In-C linking the tetramers into an infinite network. The solid state structures of GaMe_{3} and TlMe_{3} are similar. The association in the solid state accounts for the high melting point of 89°–89.8 °C compared to triethylindium which melts at −32 °C.

The rhombohedral form of InMe_{3} consists of cyclic hexamers with 12 membered (InC)_{6} rings in an extended chair conformation. The hexamers are interlinked into an infinite network. Indium atoms are five coordinate the equatorial In-C distances average 216.7pm almost identical to the average for the tetragonal form, and the axial bonds are 302.8pm joining the InMe_{3} units into hexamers and 313.4 pm linking the hexamers to form the infinite network.

== Application to microelectronics ==
Indium is a component of several compound semiconductors, including as InP, InAs, InN, InSb, GaInAs, InGaN, AlGaInP, AlInP, and AlInGaNP. These materials are prepared by metalorganic vapour phase epitaxy (MOVPE) and TMI is the preferred source for the indium component. High purity in TMI (99.9999% pure or greater) is essential for many of these applications. For some materials, electron mobilities are observed as high as 287,000 cm²/Vs at 77 K and 5400 cm²/Vs at 300 K, and background carrier concentration as low as 6×10^{13} cm^{−3}.

=== Vapor pressure equation ===
The vapor pressure equation log P (Torr) = 10.98–3204/T (K) describes TMI within a wide range of MOVPE growth conditions.

== Safety ==
TMI is pyrophoric.
