= Anomalous Transport Rocket Experiment =

Watch this video to learn more about NASA's Anomalous Transport Rocket Experiment (ATREX) mission.

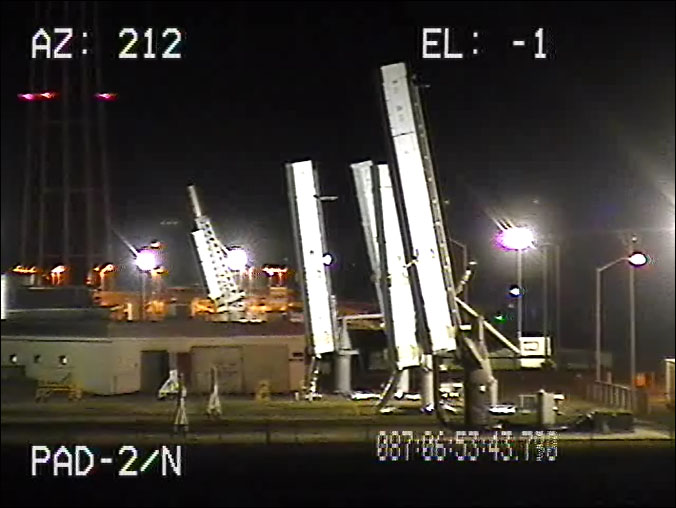
All launchers at Pad 2 of the Wallops Flight Facility at nominal settings. March 27, 2012, 2:53 a.m. EDT (UTC−04)

The Anomalous Transport Rocket Experiment (ATREX) is a heliophysics experiment that was conducted by NASA's Goddard Space Flight Center out of the Wallops Flight Facility located on the Eastern Shore of Virginia. The mission entailed the use of 5 sounding rockets launched closely in time together, each of which released a chemical tracer into the high-altitude jet stream.

The rocket launches were widely visible to residents of the Eastern seaboard from as far north as New York to as far south as North Carolina, while the tracers were visible throughout the Eastern seaboard. ATREX principal investigator Miguel Larsen said of the chemical tracer release: "They occur in the middle of the night, and they glow, It's not extremely bright, but it's definitely visible."

The mission operating window was set from March 14 to April 3, 2012, with launch windows expected to occur between 11:00 pm and 6:30 am the following morning, local time. The first launch attempt was cancelled due to internal radio frequency interference on one of the instrumented payloads. The malfunction was detected during preparations for the launches during the evening of March 14. Five other launch attempts were subsequently cancelled, primarily due to weather. The launch attempt that took place on the evening of March 20–21 reached T-15 minutes before being put on hold and subsequently canceled due to an equipment problem and weather conditions.

The launch took place just before the launch window closed for the mission at 5 a.m. EDT, Tuesday, March 27, 2012.

== Mission details ==
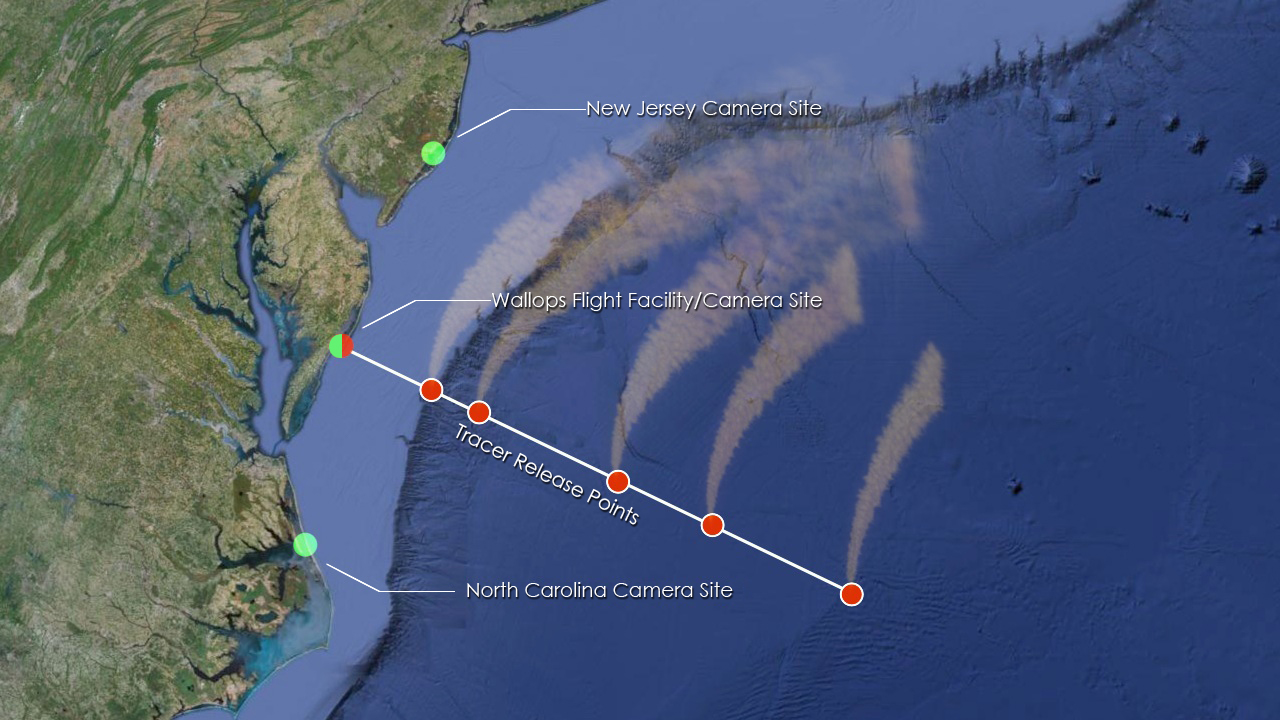

The mission used two Terrier Improved Malemute, two Terrier Improved Orion, and one Terrier Oriole sounding rockets. The rockets were launched within a span of 5 minutes and 20 seconds, with one rocket launched every 80 seconds. All five released their chemical tracer payload, which is made up of trimethyl aluminum, at roughly the same time while at slightly different altitudes. Two of the rockets also carried instruments in order to measure atmospheric pressure and temperature, while three different cameras located in North Carolina, New Jersey, and Wallops Flight Facility, tracked the tracers in order to measure how quickly they move away from each other.
