= Triethylborane =

Pyrophoric liquid

Triethylborane
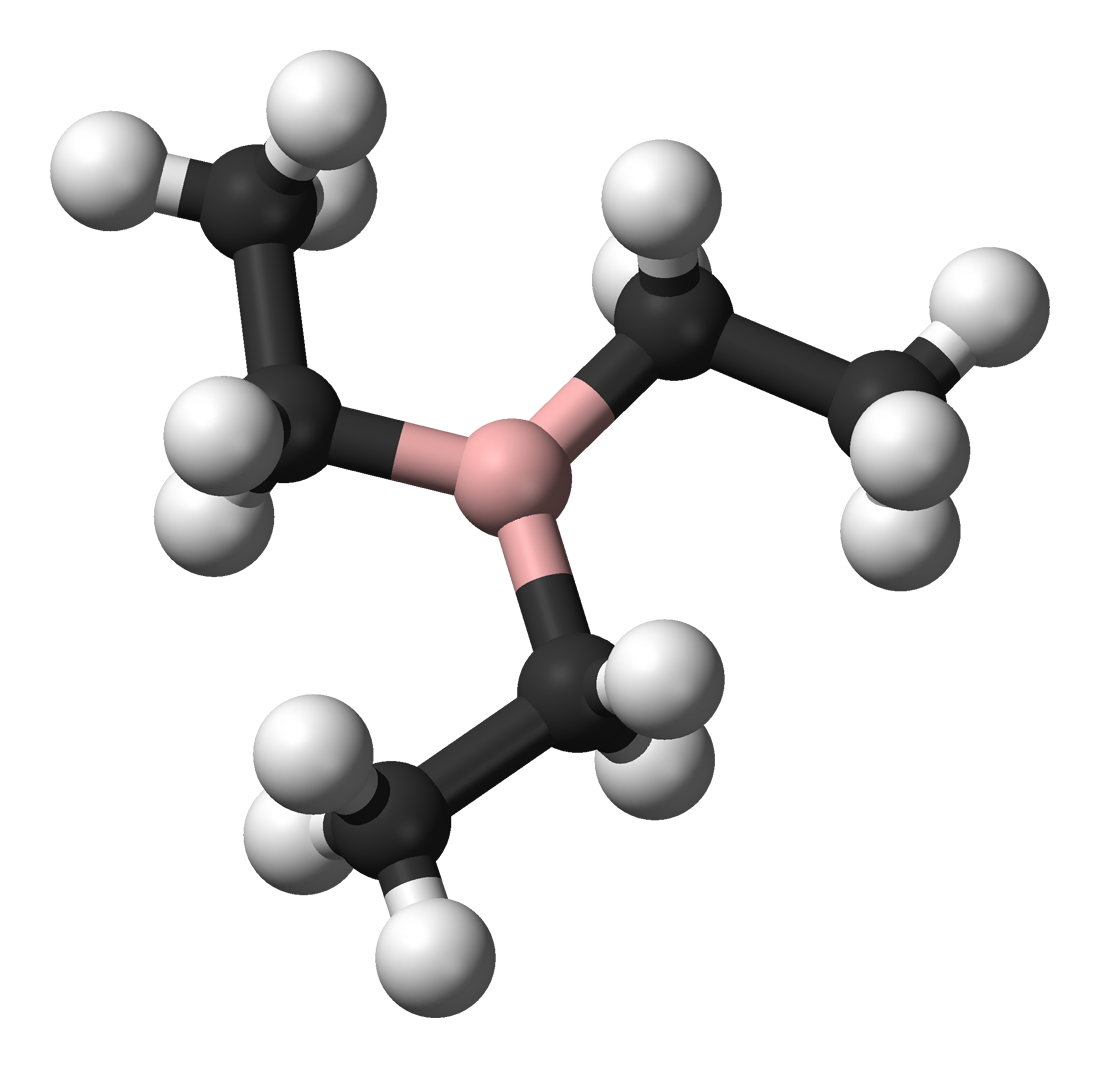
Ball-and-stick model of triethylborane

Names
- Preferred IUPAC name Triethylborane
- Other names Triethylborine, triethylboron

Identifiers
CAS Number	97-94-9
3D model (JSmol)	Interactive image
ChemSpider	7079
ECHA InfoCard	100.002.383
EC Number	202-620-9
PubChem CID	7357
UNII	Z3S980Z4P3
CompTox Dashboard (EPA)	DTXSID2052653
- InChI: InChI=1S/C6H15B/c1-4-7(5-2)6-3/h4-6H2,1-3H3 Key: LALRXNPLTWZJIJ-UHFFFAOYSA-N; InChI=1/C6H15B/c1-4-7(5-2)6-3/h4-6H2,1-3H3 Key: LALRXNPLTWZJIJ-UHFFFAOYAU
- SMILES: B(CC)(CC)CC

Properties
Chemical formula	(CH_{3}CH_{2})_{3}B
Molar mass	98.00 g/mol
Appearance	Colorless liquid
Density	0.677 g/cm^{3}
Melting point	−93 °C (−135 °F; 180 K)
Boiling point	95 °C (203 °F; 368 K)
Solubility in water	Not applicable; highly reactive

Hazards
- Occupational safety and health (OHS/OSH)
Main hazards	Spontaneously flammable in air; causes burns
- GHS labelling
Pictograms	(GHS02: Flammable) (GHS05: Corrosive) (GHS06: Toxic) (GHS08: Health hazard)
Signal word	Danger
Hazard statements	H225, H250, H301, H314, H330, H360
Precautionary statements	P201, P202, P210, P222, P233, P240, P241, P242, P243, P260, P264, P270, P271, P280, P281, P284, P301+P310, P301+P330+P331, P302+P334, P303+P361+P353, P304+P340, P305+P351+P338, P308+P313, P310, P320, P321, P330, P363, P370+P378, P403+P233, P403+P235, P405, P422, P501
NFPA 704 (fire diamond)	3 4 4 W
Flash point	< −20 °C (−4 °F; 253 K)
Autoignition temperature	−20 °C (−4 °F; 253 K)
Safety data sheet (SDS)	External SDS

Related compounds
Related compounds	Tetraethyllead; Diborane; Sodium tetraethylborate; Trimethylborane; Triethylaluminium; Triethylgallium; Triethylindium
- Except where otherwise noted, data are given for materials in their standard state (at 25 °C [77 °F], 100 kPa). verify (what is ?) Infobox references

Triethylborane (TEB), also called triethylboron, is an organoborane (a compound with a B–C bond). It is a colorless pyrophoric liquid. Its chemical formula is (CH_{3}CH_{2})_{3}B or (C_{2}H_{5})_{3}B, abbreviated Et_{3}B. It is soluble in organic solvents tetrahydrofuran and hexane.

== Preparation and structure ==
Triethylborane is prepared by the reaction of trimethyl borate with triethylaluminium:

Et_{3}Al + (MeO)_{3}B → Et_{3}B + (MeO)_{3}Al

The molecule is monomeric, unlike H_{3}B and Et_{3}Al, which tend to dimerize. It has a planar BC_{3} core.

== Applications ==
=== Turbojet engines ===
Triethylborane was used to ignite the JP-7 fuel in the Pratt & Whitney J58 turbojet/ramjet engines powering the Lockheed SR-71 Blackbird and its predecessor, the A-12 OXCART. Triethylborane is suitable because it ignites readily upon exposure to oxygen. It was chosen as an ignition method for reliability reasons, and in the case of the Blackbird, because JP-7 fuel has very low volatility and is difficult to ignite. Conventional ignition plugs posed a high risk of malfunction. Triethylborane was used to start each engine and to ignite the afterburners.

=== Rocketry ===
Mixed with 10–15% triethylaluminium, it was used before lift-off to ignite the F-1 engines on the Saturn V rocket.

The Merlin engines that power the SpaceX Falcon 9 rocket use a triethylaluminium-triethylborane mixture (TEA-TEB) as a first- and second-stage ignitor.

The Firefly Aerospace Alpha launch vehicle's Reaver engines are also ignited by a triethylaluminium-triethylborane mixture.

=== Organic chemistry ===
Industrially, triethylborane is used as an initiator in radical reactions, where it is effective even at low temperatures. As an initiator, it can replace some organotin compounds.

It reacts with metal enolates, yielding enoxytriethylborates that can be alkylated at the α-carbon atom of the ketone more selectively than in its absence. For example, the enolate from treating cyclohexanone with potassium hydride produces 2-allylcyclohexanone in 90% yield when triethylborane is present. Without it, the product mixture contains 43% of the mono-allylated product, 31% di-allylated cyclohexanones, and 28% unreacted starting material. The choice of base and temperature influences whether the more or less stable enolate is produced, allowing control over the position of substituents. Starting from 2-methylcyclohexanone, reacting with potassium hydride and triethylborane in THF at room temperature leads to the more substituted (and more stable) enolate, whilst reaction at −78 °C with potassium hexamethyldisilazide, KN[Si(CH_{3})_{3}]_{2} and triethylborane generates the less substituted (and less stable) enolate. After reaction with methyl iodide the former mixture gives 2,2-dimethylcyclohexanone in 90% yield while the latter produces 2,6-dimethylcyclohexanone in 93% yield. The Et stands for ethyl group CH_{3}CH_{2}−.

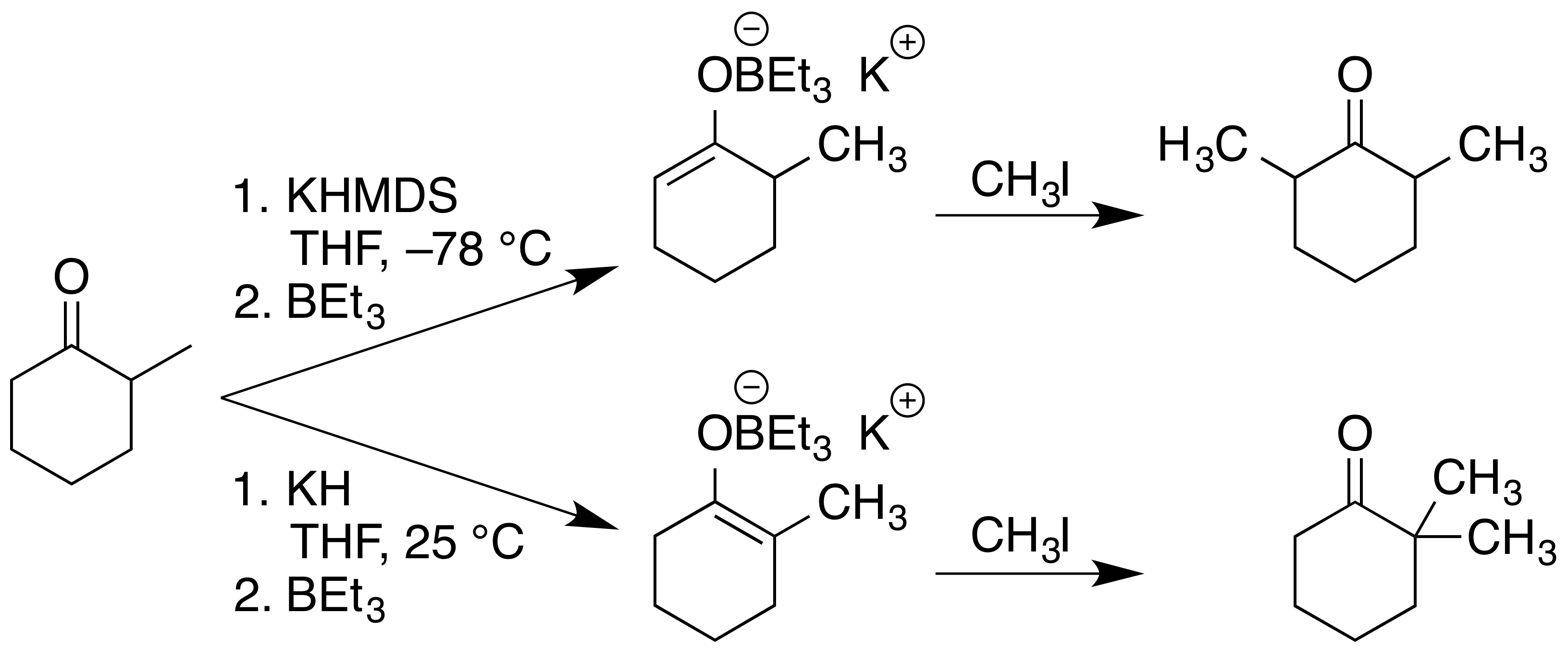

It is used in the Barton–McCombie deoxygenation reaction for deoxygenation of alcohols. In combination with lithium tri-tert-butoxyaluminum hydride it cleaves ethers. For example, THF is converted, after hydrolysis, to 1-butanol. It also promotes certain variants of the Reformatskii reaction.

Triethylborane is the precursor to the reducing agents lithium triethylborohydride ("Superhydride") and sodium triethylborohydride.

MH + Et_{3}B → MBHEt_{3} (M = Li, Na)

Triethylborane reacts with methanol to form diethyl(methoxy)borane, which is used as the chelating agent in the Narasaka–Prasad reduction for the stereoselective generation of syn-1,3-diols from β-hydroxyketones.

== Safety ==
Triethylborane is strongly pyrophoric, with an autoignition temperature of −20 °C (−4 °F), burning with an apple-green flame characteristic for boron compounds. Thus, it is typically handled and stored using air-free techniques. Triethylborane is also acutely toxic if swallowed, with an LD_{50} of 235 mg/kg in rat test subjects.

== See also ==
- Organoboranes
- Pentaborane
- Zip fuel
