= Johnson's figure of merit =

Johnson's figure of merit is a measure of suitability of a semiconductor material for high frequency power transistor applications and requirements. More specifically, it is the product of the charge carrier saturation velocity in the material and the electric breakdown field under same conditions, first proposed by Edward O. Johnson of RCA in 1965.

Note that this figure of merit (FoM), sometimes referred to as JFoM, is applicable to both field-effect transistors (FETs), and with proper interpretation of the parameters, also to bipolar junction transistors (BJTs).

JFoM is meant to identify the relative suitability of a bulk semiconductor material for high power and high speed applications. There are variations on this FoM for evaluating relative merit specifically at high frequencies by including the cut-off frequency of a transistor made of the specific material. There are FoMs used for particular power applications like switching for example.

== Example materials ==
Note that both saturation velocity and breakdown voltage are temperature and doping/impurity level dependent

Material	Saturation velocity × 10^{5} m/s	V_{breakdown} MV/cm	JFoM Si: 1.0	Notes/refs
Silicon	1.0	0.3	1.0	
GaAs	1.2	0.3	1.2	
SiC	2.0	2.5	16.7	
InP	0.67	0.5	1.2	
GaN	2	3	20	
Diamond	2.1	10	70	

JFoM figures may vary significantly between different sources mainly due to temperature effects and sensitivity to material purity and other conditions such as crystal orientation and the measurement technique used. Breakdown field also shows some dependency on the field value itself, and somewhat to the frequency of the field also if it is not a static one. For this reason, high field electron velocities should be used for this estimation. Also, note that semiconductors GaAs and InP, belonging to two-valley family of Group III-V materials, have peak electron velocities greater than the high field saturation velocities used here.
