= Trimethylgallium =

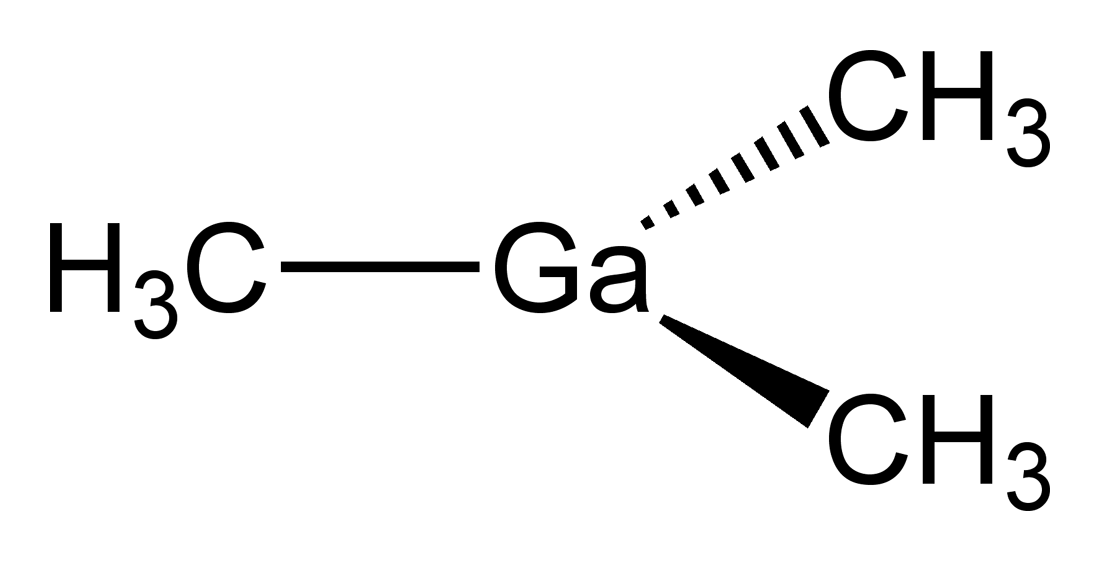
- Structural formula of trimethylgallium

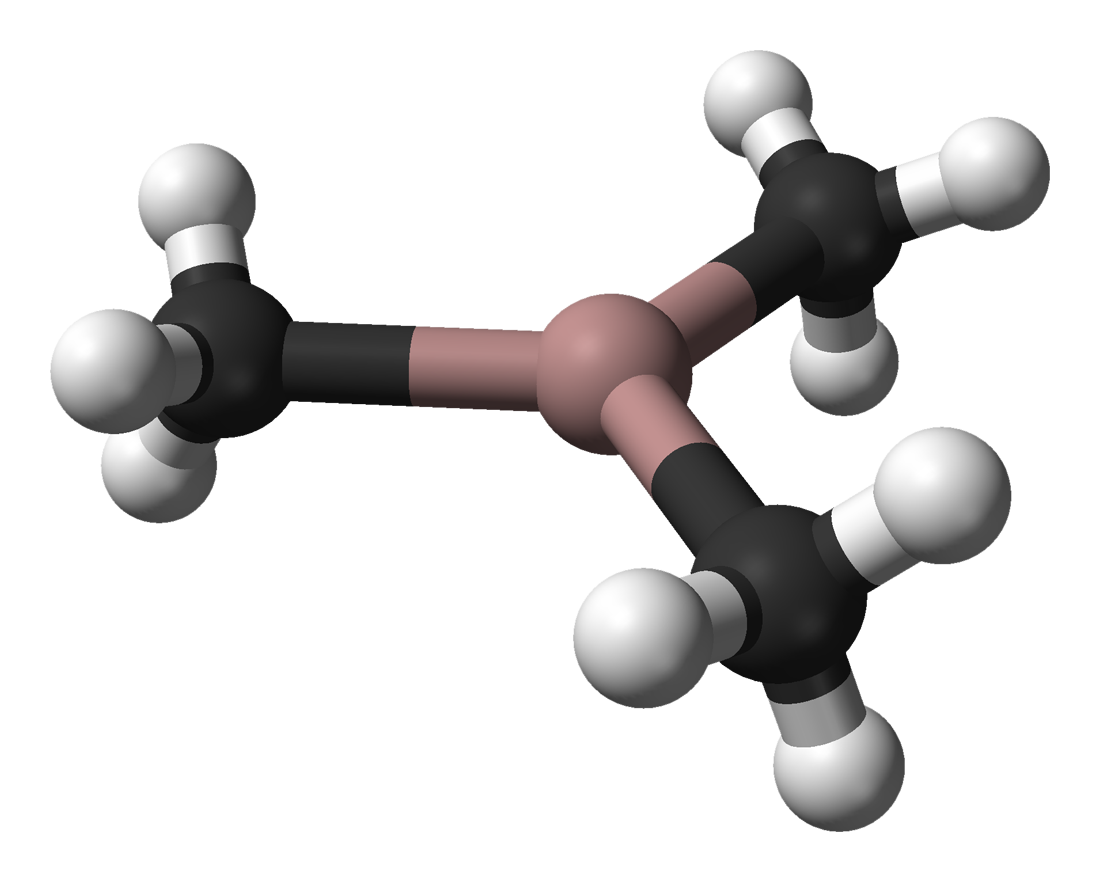
- Ball-and-stick model of trimethylgallium

Names
- IUPAC name trimethylgallane, trimethanidogallium

Identifiers
CAS Number	1445-79-0
3D model (JSmol)	Interactive image
ChemSpider	14323
ECHA InfoCard	100.014.452
EC Number	215-897-6
PubChem CID	15051
CompTox Dashboard (EPA)	DTXSID2061696
- InChI: InChI=1S/3CH3.Ga/h3*1H3; Key: XCZXGTMEAKBVPV-UHFFFAOYSA-N; InChI=1/3CH3.Ga/h3*1H3;/rC3H9Ga/c1-4(2)3/h1-3H3 Key: XCZXGTMEAKBVPV-YHXBHQJBAF
- SMILES: [Ga](C)(C)C

Properties
Chemical formula	Ga(CH_{3})_{3}
Molar mass	114.827 g/mol
Appearance	colourless liquid
Melting point	−15 °C (5 °F; 258 K)
Boiling point	55.7 °C (132.3 °F; 328.8 K)
Solubility in water	Reacts

Hazards
- Occupational safety and health (OHS/OSH)
Main hazards	Pyrophoric (can ignite spontaneously in air), reacts with water to release methane

Related compounds
Related compounds	Triethylgallium; Trimethylborane; Trimethylaluminium; Trimethylindium
- Except where otherwise noted, data are given for materials in their standard state (at 25 °C [77 °F], 100 kPa). verify (what is ?) Infobox references

Trimethylgallium, often abbreviated to TMG or TMGa, is the organogallium compound with the formula Ga(CH_{3})_{3}. It is a colorless, pyrophoric liquid. Unlike trimethylaluminium, TMG adopts a monomeric structure. When examined in detail, the monomeric units are clearly linked by multiple weak Ga---C interactions, reminiscent of the situation for trimethylindium.

== Preparation ==
Two forms of TMG are typically investigated: Lewis base adducts or TMG itself. All are prepared by reactions of gallium trichloride with various methylating agents. When the methylation is conducted with methylmagnesium iodide in diethyl ether, the product is the poorly volatile diethyl ether adduct. As noted by TMG discoverers Kraus and Toonder in 1933, the ether ligand is not readily lost, although it may be displaced with liquid ammonia. When the alkylation is conducted with methyl lithium in the presence of a tertiary phosphine the air-stable phosphine adduct is obtained:

GaCl_{3} + 3 MeLi + PR_{3} → R_{3}P−GaMe_{3} + 3 LiCl

Heating the solid phosphine adduct under vacuum liberates the base-free TMG:

R_{3}P−GaMe_{3} → R_{3}P + GaMe_{3}

Other non-volatile bases have been described. Other methylating agents for the synthesis of TMG include dimethylzinc and trimethylaluminium.

== Applications ==
TMG is the preferred metalorganic source of gallium for metalorganic vapour phase epitaxy (MOVPE) of gallium-containing compound semiconductors, such as GaAs, GaN, GaP, GaSb, InGaAs, InGaN, AlGaInP, InGaP, AlInGaNP and Ga_{2}O_{3}. These material are used in the production of LED lighting and semiconductors as a metalorganic chemical vapor deposition precursor.
