= Triethylgallium =

Names
- IUPAC name triethylgallane
- Systematic IUPAC name triethylgallium

Identifiers
CAS Number	1115-99-7
3D model (JSmol)	Interactive image
ChemSpider	59583
ECHA InfoCard	100.012.939
EC Number	214-232-7
PubChem CID	66198
CompTox Dashboard (EPA)	DTXSID1061497
- InChI: InChI=1S/3C2H5.Ga/c3*1-2;/h3*1H2,2H3; Key: RGGPNXQUMRMPRA-UHFFFAOYSA-N
- SMILES: CC[Ga](CC)CC

Properties
Chemical formula	C_{6}H_{15}Ga
Molar mass	156.9 g/mol
Appearance	colourless liquid
Melting point	−82.3 °C (−116.1 °F; 190.8 K)
Boiling point	143 °C (289 °F; 416 K)
Solubility in water	Reacts

Hazards
- Occupational safety and health (OHS/OSH)
Main hazards	pyrophoric

Related compounds
Related compounds	Trimethylgallium; Triethylborane; Triethylaluminium; Triethylindium
- Except where otherwise noted, data are given for materials in their standard state (at 25 °C [77 °F], 100 kPa). Infobox references

Triethylgallium is the organogallium compound with the formul Ga(C_{2}H_{5})_{3}. Also called TEGa, it is a metalorganic source of gallium for metalorganic vapour phase epitaxy (MOVPE) of compound semiconductors. It is a colorless pyrophoric liquid, typically handled with air-free techniques. It was discovered by Cornell University chemists L. M. Dennis and Winton Patnode in 1931.

== Preparation and reactions ==
The main routes involve alkylation of gallium trichloride. When this alkylation is effected with ethyl Grignard reagent in ether, the product is the diethyl ether adduct of triethylgallium. The ether is not easily removed. Thus an alternative route involves transmetalation with triethylaluminium according to this simplified equation:

GaCl_{3} + 3 AlEt_{3} → GaEt_{3} + 3 AlClEt_{2}

Triethylgallium readily converts to the air-stable, colorless alkoxide by two routes, oxidation and alcoholysis:

GaEt_{3} + 0.5 O_{2} → GaEt_{2}(OEt)
GaEt_{3} + EtOH → GaEt_{2}(OEt) + EtH

The sweet odor associated with triethylgallium is due to the alkoxide.

Redistribution reactions occur with gallium trichloride:

2GaEt_{3} + GaCl_{3} → 3 GaEt_{2}Cl

== Applications ==
TEGa can be a useful alternative to trimethylgallium in the metalorganic vapour phase epitaxy of compound semiconductors because films grown using TEGa have been shown to have a lower carbon impurity concentration.

== Related compounds ==
- Trimethylgallium, with similar properties.
