= Triethylaluminium =

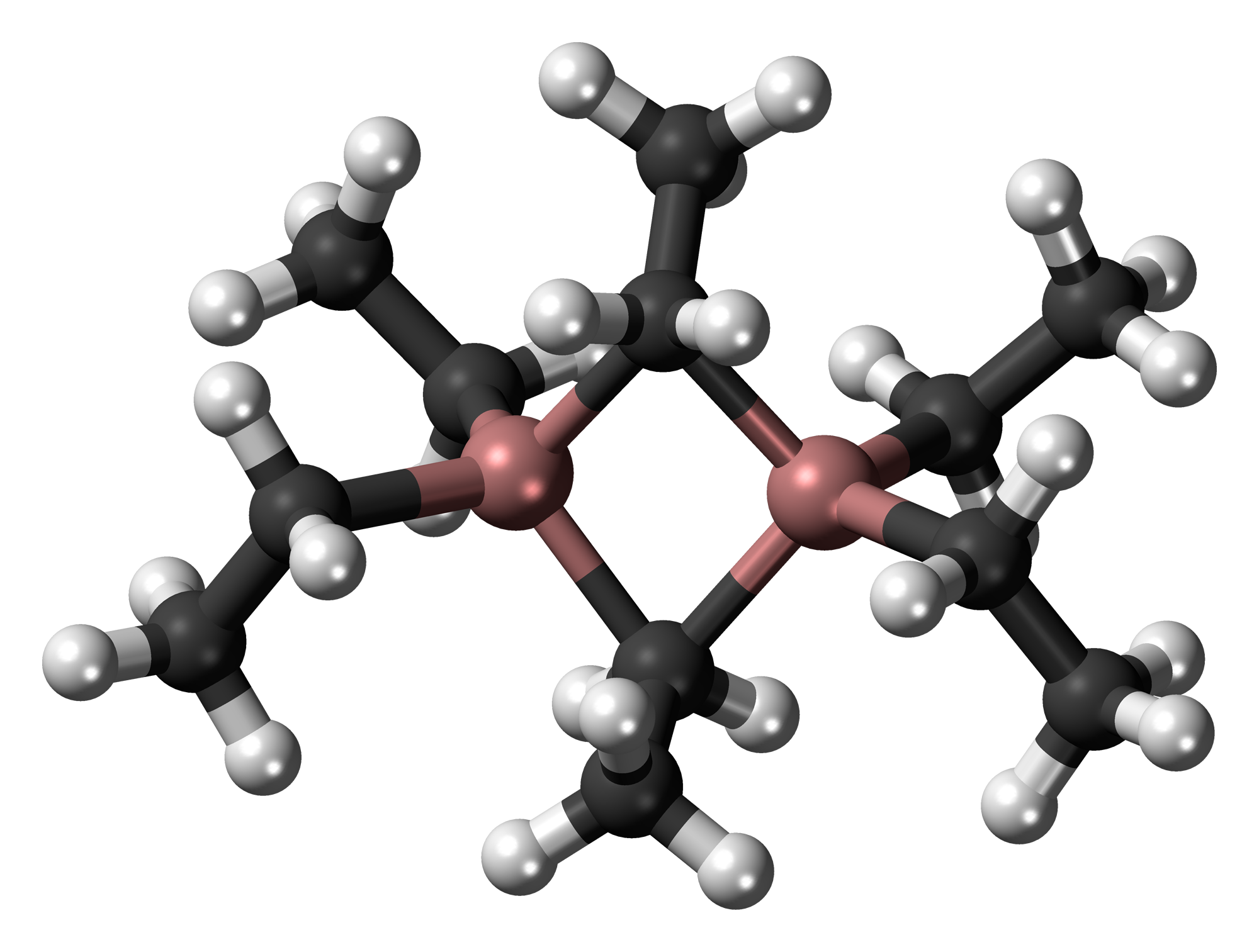

Names
- IUPAC name Triethylalumane

Identifiers
CAS Number	97-93-8
3D model (JSmol)	Interactive image; dimer: Interactive image
Abbreviations	TEA, TEAl, TEAL
ChemSpider	10179159
ECHA InfoCard	100.002.382
EC Number	202-619-3
PubChem CID	16682930
UNII	H426E9H3TT
UN number	3051
CompTox Dashboard (EPA)	DTXSID6026616
- InChI: InChI=1S/3C2H5.Al/c3*1-2;/h3*1H2,2H3; Key: VOITXYVAKOUIBA-UHFFFAOYSA-N; InChI=1/3C2H5.Al/c3*1-2;/h3*1H2,2H3;/rC6H15Al/c1-4-7(5-2)6-3/h4-6H2,1-3H3 Key: VOITXYVAKOUIBA-DVVALISXAR
- SMILES: CC[Al](CC)CC; dimer: CC[Al-](CC)([CH2+]1C)[CH2+](C)[Al-]1(CC)CC

Properties
Chemical formula	C_{12}H_{30}Al_{2}
Molar mass	228.335 g·mol^{−1}
Appearance	Colorless liquid
Density	0.8324 g/mL at 25 °C
Melting point	−46 °C (−51 °F; 227 K)
Boiling point	128 to 130 °C (262 to 266 °F; 401 to 403 K) at 50 mmHg
Solubility in water	Reacts
Solubility	Ether, hydrocarbons, THF

Hazards
- Occupational safety and health (OHS/OSH)
Main hazards	pyrophoric
- GHS labelling
Pictograms	(GHS02: Flammable) (GHS05: Corrosive)
Signal word	Danger
Hazard statements	H250, H260, H314
Precautionary statements	P210, P222, P223, P231+P232, P260, P264, P280, P301+P330+P331, P302+P334, P303+P361+P353, P304+P340, P305+P351+P338, P310, P321, P335+P334, P363, P370+P378, P402+P404, P405, P422, P501
NFPA 704 (fire diamond)	3 4 3 W
Flash point	−18 °C (0 °F; 255 K)

Related compounds
Related compounds	Trimethylaluminium; Triisobutylaluminium; Triethylborane; Triethylgallium; Triethylindium
- Except where otherwise noted, data are given for materials in their standard state (at 25 °C [77 °F], 100 kPa). verify (what is ?) Infobox references

Triethylaluminium (generally abbreviated as TEA) is one of the simplest examples of an organoaluminium compound. Despite its name, the compound has the formula Al_{2}(C_{2}H_{5})_{6}, which equates to the dimer of the expected species. This kind of oligomerization is common in sterically unhindered organometallics. It is an exceedingly pyrophoric material that exists as a colourless liquid over a wide range of temperatures. It is an industrially important compound, closely related to trimethylaluminium.

== Structure and bonding ==
The structure and bonding in Al_{2}R_{6} and diborane are analogous (R = alkyl). Referring to Al_{2}Me_{6}, the Al-C(terminal) and Al-C(bridging) distances are 1.97 and 2.14 Å, respectively. The Al center is tetrahedral. The carbon atoms of the bridging ethyl groups are each surrounded by five neighbors: carbon, two hydrogen atoms and two aluminium atoms. The ethyl groups interchange readily intramolecularly. At higher temperatures, the dimer cracks into monomeric AlEt_{3}.

== Synthesis and reactions ==
Triethylaluminium can be formed via several routes. The discovery of an efficient route was a significant technological achievement. The multistep process uses aluminium, hydrogen gas, and ethylene, summarized as follows:

2 Al + 3 H_{2} + 6 C_{2}H_{4} → Al_{2}Et_{6}

Because of this efficient synthesis, triethylaluminium is one of the most available organoaluminium compounds.

Triethylaluminium can also be generated from ethylaluminium sesquichloride (Al_{2}Cl_{3}Et_{3}), which arises by treating aluminium powder with chloroethane. Reduction of ethylaluminium sesquichloride with an alkali metal such as sodium gives triethylaluminium:

2 Al_{2}Cl_{3}Et_{3} + 6 Na → Al_{2}Et_{6} + 2 Al + 6 NaCl

=== Reactivity ===
The Al–C bonds of triethylaluminium are polarized to such an extent that the carbon is easily protonated, releasing ethane:

Al_{2}Et_{6} + 6 HX → 2 AlX_{3} + 6 EtH

For this reaction, even weak acids can be employed such as terminal acetylenes and alcohols.

The linkage between the pair of aluminium centres is relatively weak and can be cleaved by Lewis bases (L) to give adducts with the formula AlEt_{3}L:

Al_{2}Et_{6} + 2 L → 2 LAlEt_{3}

== Applications ==
=== Precursors to fatty alcohols ===
Triethylaluminium is used industrially as an intermediate in the production of fatty alcohols, which are converted to detergents. The first step involves the oligomerization of ethylene by the Aufbau reaction, which gives a mixture of trialkylaluminium compounds (simplified here as octyl groups):

Al_{2}(C_{2}H_{5})_{6} + 18 C_{2}H_{4} → Al_{2}(C_{8}H_{17})_{6}

Subsequently, these trialkyl compounds are oxidized to aluminium alkoxides, which are then hydrolysed:

Al_{2}(C_{8}H_{17})_{6} + 3 O_{2} → Al_{2}(OC_{8}H_{17})_{6}
Al_{2}(OC_{8}H_{17})_{6} + 6 H_{2}O → 6 C_{8}H_{17}OH + 2 Al(OH)_{3}

=== Co-catalysts in olefin polymerization ===
A large amount of TEAL and related aluminium alkyls are used in Ziegler-Natta catalysis. They serve to activate the transition metal catalyst both as a reducing agent and an alkylating agent. TEAL also functions to scavenge water and oxygen.

=== Reagent in organic and organometallic chemistry ===
Triethylaluminium has niche uses as a precursor to other organoaluminium compounds, such as diethylaluminium cyanide:

$$\ce{{1/2Al2Et6} + HCN ->}\ \tfrac 1 n \ce{[Et2AlCN]}_n + \ce{C2H6}$$

=== Pyrophoric agent ===
Triethylaluminium ignites on contact with air and will ignite and/or decompose on contact with water, and with any other oxidizer—it is one of the few substances sufficiently pyrophoric to ignite on contact with cryogenic liquid oxygen. The enthalpy of combustion, Δ_{c}H°, is –5105.70 ± 2.90 kJ/mol (–22.36 kJ/g). Its easy ignition makes it particularly desirable as a rocket engine ignitor. The SpaceX Falcon 9 rocket uses a triethylaluminium-triethylborane mixture as a first-stage ignitor.

Triethylaluminium thickened with polyisobutylene is used as an incendiary weapon, as a pyrophoric alternative to napalm; e.g., in the M74 clip holding four rockets for the M202A1 launchers. In this application it is known as TPA, for thickened pyrotechnic agent or thickened pyrophoric agent. The usual amount of the thickener is 6%. The amount of thickener can be decreased to 1% if other diluents are added. For example, n-hexane, can be used with increased safety by rendering the compound non-pyrophoric until the diluent evaporates, at which point a combined fireball results from both the triethylaluminium and the hexane vapors. The M202 was withdrawn from service in the mid-1980s owing to safety, transport, and storage issues. Some saw limited use in the Afghanistan War against caves and fortified compounds.

== See also ==
- Triethylborane, used as an ignitor in the Pratt & Whitney J58 turbojet/ramjet engines.
- Trimethylaluminium
