= Water-reactive substances =

Substances that readily reacts with water

Water-reactive substances are those that spontaneously undergo a chemical reaction with water, often noted as generating flammable gas. Some are highly reducing in nature. Notable examples include alkali metals, lithium through caesium, and alkaline earth metals, magnesium through barium.

Some water-reactive substances are also pyrophoric, like organometallics and sulfuric acid. The use of acid-resistant gloves and face shield is recommended for safe handling; fume hoods are another effective control of such substances.

The UN Recommendations on the Transport of Dangerous Goods Model Regulation classifies Water-reactive substances as Class 4.3 (substances which in contact with water emit flammable gases). Countries worldwide have adopted the UN model regulations into their transport of dangerous goods regulations for both international and domestic transportation by road, rail, air and sea. In an NFPA 704 fire diamond's white square, and in similar contexts, they are denoted as "~~W~~". The classification of substances as water-reactive is largely a consideration for the safety of firefighting and transportation operations.

All chemicals that react vigorously with water or liberate toxic gas when in contact with water are recognized for their hazardous nature in the "Approved Supply List", or the list of substances covered by the international legislation on major hazards, many of which are commonly used in manufacturing processes.

== Alkali metals ==
Group 1: Alkali metals

Reaction of sodium (Na) and water

Reaction of potassium (K) in water

The alkali metals (Li, Na, K, Rb, Cs, and Fr) are the most reactive metals in the periodic table - they all react vigorously or even explosively with cold water, resulting in the displacement of hydrogen.

The Group 1 metal (M) is oxidised to its metal ions, and water is reduced to hydrogen gas (H_{2}) and hydroxide ion (OH^{−}), giving a general equation of:

2 M(s) + 2 H_{2}O(l) ⟶ 2 M^{+}(aq) + 2 OH^{−}(aq) + H_{2}(g)

The Group 1 metals or alkali metals become more reactive as their number of energy levels increases.

== Alkaline earth metals ==
Group 2: Alkaline earth metals

The alkaline earth metals (Be, Mg, Ca, Sr, Ba, and Ra) are the second most reactive metals in the periodic table, and, like the Group 1 metals, have increasing reactivity with increasing numbers of energy levels. Beryllium (Be) is the only alkaline earth metal that does not react with water, though it reacts with steam if it is heated to high enough temperatures. Additionally, beryllium has a resistant outer oxide layer that lowers its reactivity at lower temperatures.

Magnesium shows insignificant reaction with water, but burns vigorously with steam or water vapor to produce white magnesium oxide and hydrogen gas:

Mg(s) + H_{2}O(g) ⟶ MgO(s) + H_{2}(g)

Magnesium has a mild reaction with cold water. The reaction is short-lived because the magnesium hydroxide layer formed on the magnesium is almost insoluble in water and prevents further reaction.

Mg(s) + 2H_{2}O(l) ⟶ Mg(OH)_{2}(s) + H_{2}(g)

A metal reacting with cold water will produce a metal hydroxide and hydrogen gas. However, if a metal reacts with steam, like magnesium, metal oxide is produced as a result of metal hydroxides splitting upon heating.

The hydroxides of calcium, strontium and barium are only slightly water-soluble but produce sufficient hydroxide ions to make the environment basic, giving a general equation of:

M(s) + 2 H_{2}O(l) ⟶ M(OH)_{2}(aq) + H_{2}(g)

Radium reacts similarly to the rest of the alkaline earth metals (other than magnesium), forming radium hydroxide and hydrogen gas. Notably, radium hydroxide is the most soluble out of all alkaline earth hydroxide species.

== Reactivity series of metals ==
Order of reactivity	Metal	Reactions with water or steam
Most reactive	potassium (K)	Very vigorous reaction with cold water
Second most reactive	sodium (Na)	Vigorous reaction with cold water
Third most reactive	calcium (Ca)	Less vigorous reaction with cold water
Least reactive	magnesium (Mg)	Slow reaction with cold water, vigorous with hot water

- If metals react with cold water, hydroxides are produced.
- If metals react with steam, oxides are formed.

Hydrogen is always produced when a metal reacts with cold water or steam.

== Halogens ==
Halogens are so named due to their potential to form salts, and form many simple strong acids with hydrogen. Out of the four stable halogens, only fluorine and chlorine have reduction potentials higher than that of oxygen, allowing them to form hydrofluoric acid and hydrochloric acid directly through reaction with water. The reaction of fluorine with water is especially hazardous, as an addition of fluorine gas to cold water will produce hydrofluoric acid, oxygen gas, and ozone. However, the reaction is fairly slow.
