= Triethylindium =

Names
- IUPAC name Triethylindium
- Other names Indium triethyl, triethylindigane, indiumtriethyl, TEI, TEIn

Identifiers
CAS Number	923-34-2
3D model (JSmol)	Interactive image
ChemSpider	92075
ECHA InfoCard	100.011.905
PubChem CID	101912
CompTox Dashboard (EPA)	DTXSID1061281
- InChI: InChI=1S/3C2H5.In/c3*1-2;/h3*1H2,2H3; Key: OTRPZROOJRIMKW-UHFFFAOYSA-N
- SMILES: CC[In](CC)CC

Properties
Chemical formula	In(CH_{2}CH_{3})_{3}
Molar mass	202.004 g·mol^{−1}
Appearance	Colorless liquid
Density	1.384 g/cm^{3}
Melting point	−32 °C (−26 °F; 241 K)
Boiling point	144 °C (291 °F; 417 K)
Solubility in water	Reacts violently
Refractive index (n_{D})	1.5380

Hazards
- Occupational safety and health (OHS/OSH)
Main hazards	Causes severe skin burns and serious eye damage. Spontaneously ignites on air.
- GHS labelling
Pictograms	(GHS02: Flammable) (GHS05: Corrosive)
Signal word	Danger
Hazard statements	H250, H314
Precautionary statements	P210, P222, P231, P233, P260, P264, P280, P301+P330+P331, P302+P335+P334, P302+P361+P354, P304+P340, P305+P354+P338, P316, P321, P363, P370+P378, P405, P501

Related compounds
Related compounds	Trimethylindium; Triethylborane; Triethylaluminium; Triethylgallium
- Except where otherwise noted, data are given for materials in their standard state (at 25 °C [77 °F], 100 kPa). Infobox references

Triethylindium is an organometallic compound. Its chemical formula is In(CH_{2}CH_{3})_{3}.

== Synthesis ==
This compound can be obtained by reacting indium(III) bromide with a diethyl ether solution of ethylmagnesium bromide:

InBr_{3} + 3 CH_{3}CH_{2}MgBr → In(CH_{2}CH_{3})_{3} + 3 MgBr_{2}

Other routes are also known.

== Properties ==
Indium triethyl is a colorless, toxic, oxidation and hydrolysis-sensitive liquid. It is a monomer in the gaseous and dissolved state. The compound reacts with halomethanes to form diethyl indium halides.

Triethylindium reacts violently with water:

In(CH_{2}CH_{3})_{3} + H_{2}O → In(CH_{2}CH_{3})_{2}OH + C_{2}H_{6}↑

== Applications ==
Indium triethyl is used to prepare indium phosphide layers for microelectronics.

== See also ==
- Trimethylindium
