= Aluminium gallium arsenide =

Semiconductor material

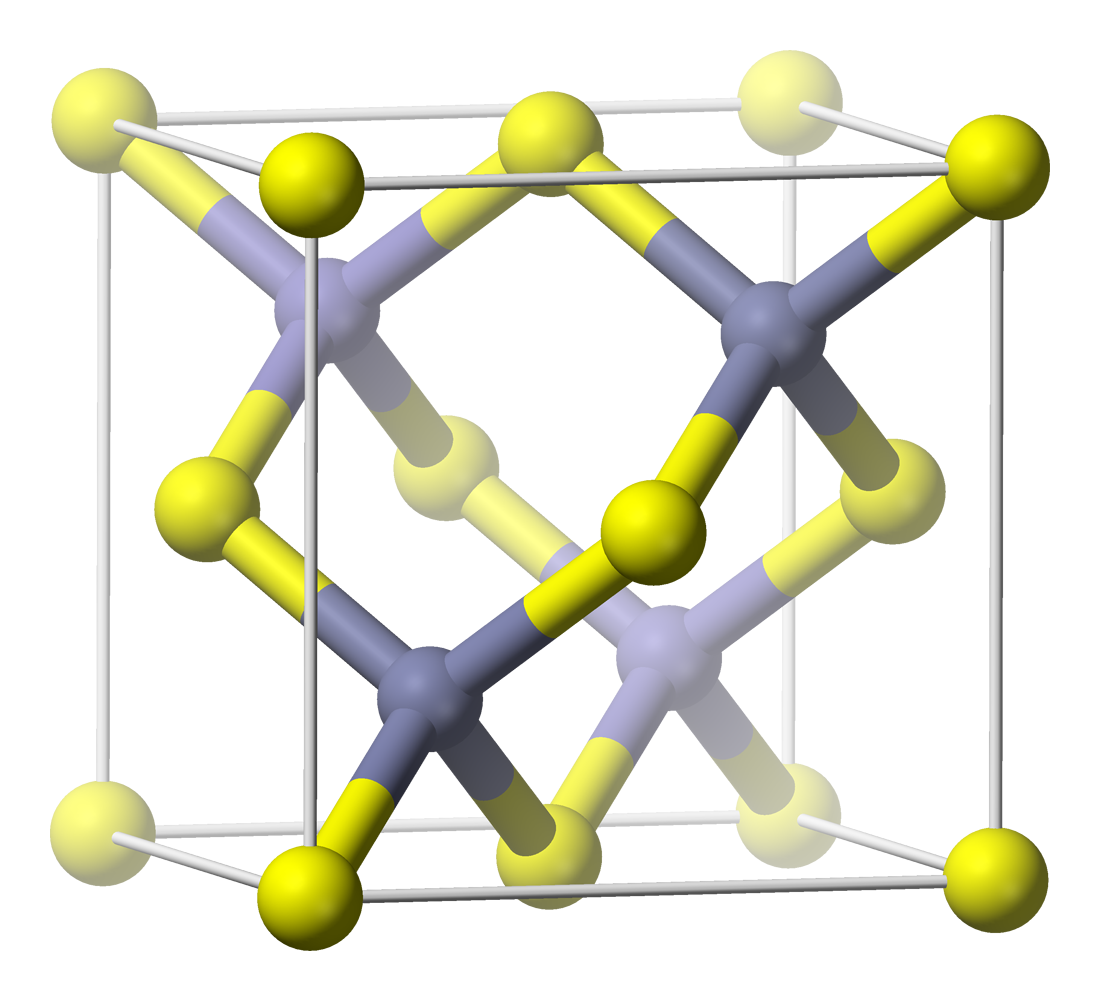
The crystal structure of aluminium gallium arsenide is zincblende.

Aluminium gallium arsenide (also gallium aluminium arsenide) (Al_{x}Ga_{1−x}As) is a semiconductor material with very nearly the same lattice constant as GaAs, but a larger bandgap. The x in the formula above is a number between 0 and 1 - this indicates an arbitrary alloy between GaAs and AlAs.

The chemical formula AlGaAs should be considered an abbreviated form of the above, rather than any particular ratio.

The bandgap varies between 1.42 eV (GaAs) and 2.16 eV (AlAs). For x < 0.4, the bandgap is direct.

The refractive index is related with the bandgap via the Kramers–Kronig relations and varies between 2.9 (x = 1) and 3.5 (x = 0). This allows the construction of Bragg mirrors used in VCSELs, RCLEDs, and substrate-transferred crystalline coatings.

Aluminium gallium arsenide is used as a barrier material in GaAs based heterostructure devices. The AlGaAs layer confines the electrons to a gallium arsenide region. An example of such a device is a quantum well infrared photodetector (QWIP).

It is commonly used in GaAs-based red- and near-infra-red-emitting (700–1100 nm) double-hetero-structure laser diodes.

== Safety and toxicity aspects ==
The toxicology of AlGaAs has not been fully investigated. The dust is an irritant to skin, eyes and lungs. The environment, health and safety aspects of aluminium gallium arsenide sources (such as trimethylgallium and arsine) and industrial hygiene monitoring studies of standard MOVPE sources have been reported recently in a review.
