= Aluminium gallium nitride =

Semiconductor material

Aluminium gallium nitride (AlGaN) is a wide-bandgap semiconductor material. It is an alloy of aluminium nitride and gallium nitride.

The bandgap of Al_{x}Ga_{1-x}N can be tailored to range from 3.4 eV (bandgap of GaN) to 6.2 eV (bandgap of AlN) depending on the AlN mole fraction, $x.$

AlGaN is used to manufacture light-emitting diodes operating in the blue to ultraviolet region of the spectrum. Emission wavelengths in the far-UV region (around 250 nm) have been achieved, with some research teams reporting emission with wavelengths as short as 222 nm and 210 nm.

AlGaN is also used in blue semiconductor lasers, detectors of ultraviolet radiation, and AlGaN/GaN high-electron-mobility transistors.

AlGaN is often used together with gallium nitride or aluminium nitride to form heterojunctions.

AlGaN layers are commonly grown on Gallium nitride, on sapphire or (111) Si substrates, and almost always with additional GaN layers.

== Safety and toxicity aspects ==
The toxicology of AlGaN has not been fully investigated. The AlGaN dust is an irritant to skin, eyes and lungs. The environment, health and safety aspects of aluminium gallium nitride sources (such as trimethylgallium and ammonia) and industrial hygiene monitoring studies of standard MOVPE sources have been reported recently in a review.
