= Pyrophoricity =

Tendency of a chemical compound to ignite in open air

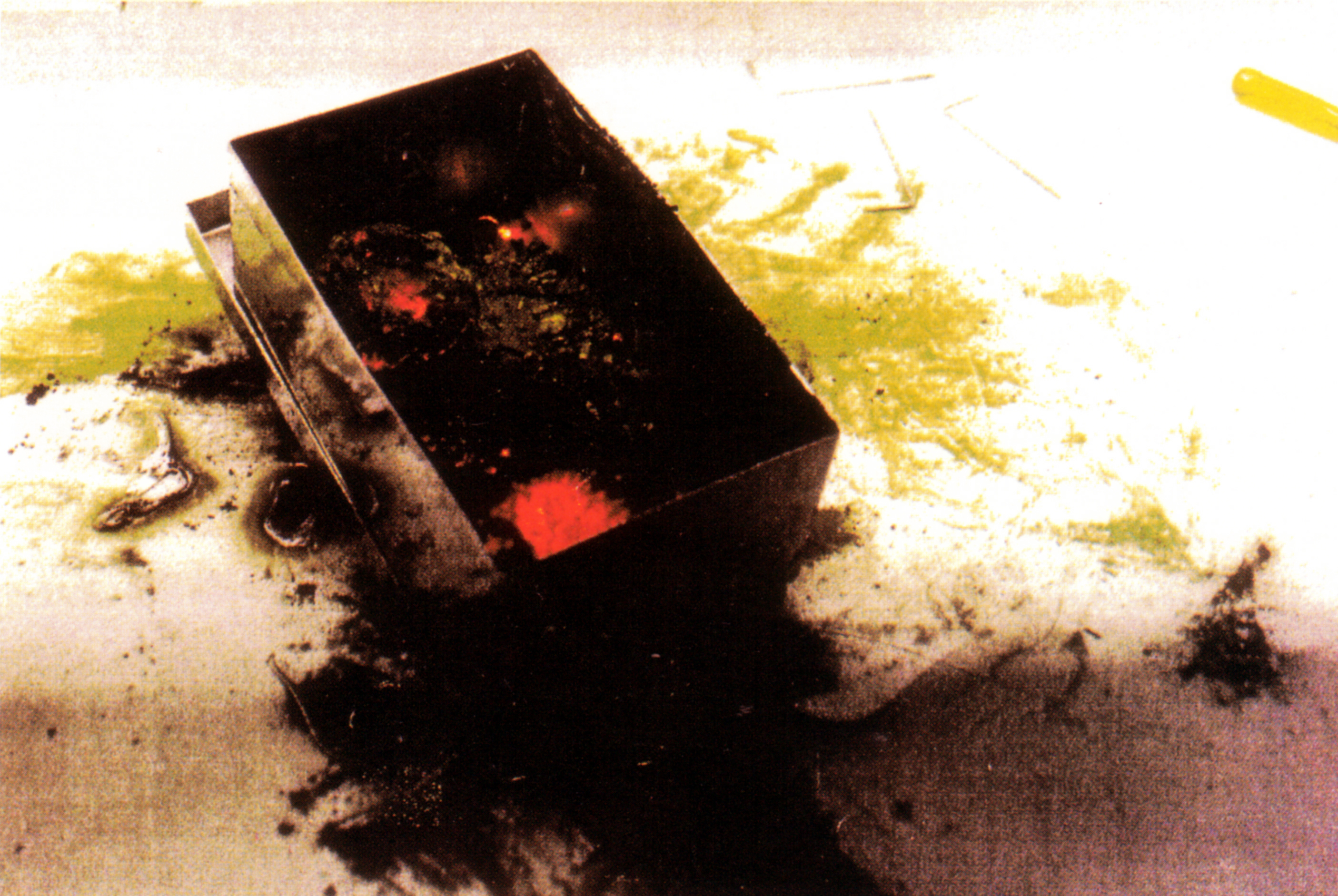
Plutonium pyrophoricity (spontaneously burning in contact with air, causes it to glow like an ember).

A substance is pyrophoric (from Ancient Greek: πυροφόρος, pyrophoros, 'fire-bearing') if it ignites spontaneously in air at or below 54 °C (129 °F) (for gases) or within five minutes after coming into contact with air (for liquids and solids). Examples are organolithium compounds and triethylborane, as well as actinides. Pyrophoric materials are often water-reactive as well and will ignite when they contact water or humid air. They can be handled safely in atmospheres of argon or (with a few exceptions) nitrogen. Class D fire extinguishers are designated for use in fires involving metals but not pyrophoric materials in general. A related concept is hypergolicity, in which two compounds spontaneously ignite when mixed.

== Uses ==
The creation of sparks from metals is based on the pyrophoricity of small metal particles, and pyrophoric alloys are made for this purpose. Practical applications include the sparking mechanisms in lighters and various toys, using ferrocerium; starting fires without matches, using a firesteel; the flintlock mechanism in firearms; and spark testing ferrous metals.

== Handling ==
The type of equipment required for transporting, handling and working with pyrophoric materials depends on the amounts of the materials and their flammability risks.

Small amounts of pyrophoric liquids are often supplied in a glass bottle with a polytetrafluoroethylene-lined septum. Larger amounts are supplied in metal tanks similar to gas cylinders, designed so a needle can fit through the valve opening. A syringe, carefully dried and flushed of air with an inert gas, is used to extract the liquid from its container.

When working with pyrophoric solids, researchers often employ a sealed glove box flushed with inert gas. Since these specialized glove boxes are expensive and require specialized and frequent maintenance, many pyrophoric solids are sold as solutions, or dispersions in mineral oil or lighter hydrocarbon solvents, so they can be handled in the atmosphere of the laboratory, while still maintaining an oxygen- and moisture-free environment. Mildly pyrophoric solids such as lithium aluminium hydride and sodium hydride can be handled in the air for brief periods of time, but the containers must be flushed with inert gas before the material is returned to the container for storage.

== Pyrophoric materials ==
=== Solids ===
- White phosphorus
- Alkali metals, especially potassium, rubidium, caesium, including the alloy NaK
- Actinides (all of which are pyrophoric metals, at least when finely divided), including neptunium, uranium, thorium, and plutonium.
  - Several compounds of plutonium are highly pyrophoric, and have caused some of the most destructive fires in research facilities operated by the United States Department of Energy.
- Finely divided metals (iron, aluminium, magnesium, calcium, zirconium, titanium, tungsten, bismuth, hafnium, osmium, and neodymium)
- Some metals and alloys in bulk form (cerium)
- Alkylated metal alkoxides or nonmetal halides (diethylethoxyaluminium, dichloro(methyl)silane)
- Potassium graphite (KC_{8})
- Metal hydrides (sodium hydride, lithium aluminium hydride, uranium trihydride)
- Partially or fully alkylated derivatives of metal and nonmetal hydrides (diethylaluminium hydride, trimethylaluminium, triethylaluminium, butyllithium), with a few exceptions (i.e. dimethylmercury and tetraethyllead)
- Copper fuel cell catalysts (zinc oxide, aluminium oxide)
- Grignard reagents (compounds of the form RMgX)
- Used hydrogenation catalysts such as palladium on carbon or Raney nickel (especially hazardous because of the adsorbed hydrogen)
- Iron(II) sulfide: often encountered in oil and gas facilities, where corrosion products in steel plant equipment can ignite if exposed to air
- Lead and carbon powders produced from decomposition of lead citrate
- Uranium, as shown in the disintegration of depleted uranium penetrator rounds into burning dust upon impact with their targets; in finely divided form it is readily ignitable, and uranium scrap from machining operations is subject to spontaneous ignition
- Petroleum hydrocarbon (PHC) sludge
- Many materials which are not pyrophoric (nor combustible) in a bulk form, become pyrophoric as nano-particles.

=== Liquids ===
- Diphosphane
- Metalorganics of main group metals (e.g. aluminium, gallium, indium, zinc, cadmium, etc.) and their non-aqueous solutions
- Triethylborane
- tert-Butyllithium
- Diethylzinc
- Triethylaluminium

=== Gases ===
- Nonmetal hydrides (arsine, phosphine, (Note: Phosphine (PH_{3}) is only pyrophoric if impure, with P_{2}H_{4} present.) diborane, germane, silane)
- Metal carbonyls (dicobalt octacarbonyl, nickel carbonyl)
