= Staring array =

Image sensor made of light-sensing pixels

A staring array, also known as staring-plane array or focal-plane array (FPA), is an image sensor consisting of an array (typically rectangular) of light-sensing pixels at the focal plane of a lens. FPAs are used most commonly for imaging purposes (e.g. taking pictures or video imagery), but can also be used for non-imaging purposes such as spectrometry, LIDAR, and wave-front sensing.

In radio astronomy, the FPA is at the focus of a radio telescope. At optical and infrared wavelengths, it can refer to a variety of imaging device types, but in common usage it refers to two-dimensional devices that are sensitive in the infrared spectrum. Devices sensitive in other spectra are usually referred to by other terms, such as CCD (charge-coupled device) and CMOS image sensor in the visible spectrum. FPAs operate by detecting photons at particular wavelengths and then generating an electrical charge, voltage, or resistance in relation to the number of photons detected at each pixel. This charge, voltage, or resistance is then measured, digitized, and used to construct an image of the object, scene, or phenomenon that emitted the photons.

Applications for infrared FPAs include missile or related weapons guidance sensors, infrared astronomy, manufacturing inspection, thermal imaging for firefighting, medical imaging, and infrared phenomenology (such as observing combustion, weapon impact, rocket motor ignition and other events that are interesting in the infrared spectrum).

== Comparison to scanning array ==
Staring arrays are distinct from scanning array and TDI imagers in that they image the desired field of view without scanning. Scanning arrays are constructed from linear arrays (or very narrow 2-D arrays) that are rastered across the desired field of view using a rotating or oscillating mirror to construct a 2-D image over time. A TDI imager operates in similar fashion to a scanning array except that it images perpendicularly to the motion of the camera. A staring array is analogous to the film in a typical camera; it directly captures a 2-D image projected by the lens at the image plane. A scanning array is analogous to piecing together a 2D image with photos taken through a narrow slit. A TDI imager is analogous to looking through a vertical slit out the side window of a moving car, and building a long, continuous image as the car passes the landscape.

Scanning arrays were developed and used because of historical difficulties in fabricating 2-D arrays of sufficient size and quality for direct 2-D imaging. Modern FPAs are available with up to 2048 x 2048 pixels, and larger sizes are in development by multiple manufacturers. 320 x 256 and 640 x 480 arrays are available and affordable even for non-military, non-scientific applications.

== Construction and materials ==
The difficulty in constructing high-quality, high-resolution FPAs derives from the materials used. Whereas visible imagers such as CCD and CMOS image sensors are fabricated from silicon, using mature and well-understood processes, IR sensors must be fabricated from other, more exotic materials because silicon is sensitive only in the visible and near-IR spectra. Infrared-sensitive materials commonly used in IR detector arrays include mercury cadmium telluride (HgCdTe, "MerCad", or "MerCadTel"), indium antimonide (InSb, pronounced "Inns-Bee"), indium gallium arsenide (InGaAs, pronounced "Inn-Gas"), and vanadium(V) oxide (VOx, pronounced "Vox"). A variety of lead salts can also be used, but are less common today. None of these materials can be grown into crystals anywhere near the size of modern silicon crystals, nor do the resulting wafers have nearly the uniformity of silicon. Furthermore, the materials used to construct arrays of IR-sensitive pixels cannot be used to construct the electronics needed to transport the resulting charge, voltage, or resistance of each pixel to the measurement circuitry. This set of functions is implemented on a chip called the multiplexer, or readout integrated circuits (ROIC), and is typically fabricated in silicon using standard CMOS processes. The detector array is then hybridized or bonded to the ROIC, typically using indium bump-bonding, and the resulting assembly is called an FPA.

Some materials (and the FPAs fabricated from them) operate only at cryogenic temperatures, and others (such as resistive amorphous silicon (a-Si) and VOx microbolometers) can operate at uncooled temperatures. Some devices are only practical to operate cryogenically as otherwise the thermal noise would swamp the detected signal. Devices can be cooled evaporatively, typically by liquid nitrogen (LN2) or liquid helium, or by using a thermo-electric cooler.

A peculiar aspect of nearly all IR FPAs is that the electrical responses of the pixels on a given device tend to be non-uniform. In a perfect device every pixel would output the same electrical signal when given the same number of photons of appropriate wavelength. In practice nearly all FPAs have both significant pixel-to-pixel offset and pixel-to-pixel photo response non-uniformity (PRNU). When un-illuminated, each pixel has a different "zero-signal" level, and when illuminated the delta in signal is also different. This non-uniformity makes the resulting images impractical for use until they have been processed to normalize the photo-response. This correction process requires a set of known characterization data, collected from the particular device under controlled conditions. The data correction can be done in software, in a DSP or FPGA in the camera electronics, or even on the ROIC in the most modern of devices.

The low volumes, rarer materials, and complex processes involved in fabricating and using IR FPAs makes them far more expensive than visible imagers of comparable size and resolution.

Staring plane arrays are used in modern air-to-air missiles and anti-tank missiles such as the AIM-9X Sidewinder, ASRAAM

Cross talk can inhibit the illumination of pixels.

== Applications ==
=== 3D LIDAR Imaging ===
Focal plane arrays (FPAs) have been reported to be used for 3D LIDAR imaging.

==== Improvements ====
In 2003, a 32 x 32 pixel breadboard was reported with capabilities to repress cross talk between FPAs. Researchers at the U.S. Army Research Laboratory used a collimator to collect and direct the breadboard’s laser beam onto individual pixels. Since low levels of voltage were still observed in pixels that did not illuminate, indicating that illumination was prevented by crosstalk. This cross talk was attributed to capacitive coupling between the microstrip lines and between the FPA’s internal conductors. By replacing the receiver in the breadboard for one with a shorter focal length, the focus of the collimator was reduced and the system’s threshold for signal recognition was increased. This facilitated a better image by cancelling cross talk.

Another method was to add a flat thinned substrate membrane (approximately 800 angstroms thick) to the FPA. This was reported to eliminate pixel-to-pixel cross talk in FPA imaging applications. In another an avalanche photodiode FPA study, the etching of trenches in between neighboring pixels reduced cross talk.

== See also ==
- Focal-plane array (radio astronomy)
