= Lynred =

French infrared technology company

- Type: Private
- Industry: Defense, Space, Industry
- Founded: 1986
- Headquarters: Av. de la Vauve, 91120 Palaiseau, France
- Key people: Hervé Bouaziz, Executive President and Xavier Caillouet, CEO
- Products: Infrared detectors
- Number of employees: 1050 (2021)
- Subsidiaries: Lynred USA
- Website: lynred.com

Lynred (often stylized as LYNRED; formerly called Sofradir) is a B2B company with headquarters in Palaiseau, France that designs and manufactures infrared (IR) detectors for military, space and commercial applications. LYNRED manufactures both cooled and uncooled microbolometers covering all infrared bands and is Europe’s leading supplier of this type of technology. The company’s headquarters are in Palaiseau, France and its R&D and production facilities are located in Veurey-Voroize in the Isère region of France.

In July 2019, Sofradir and ULIS merged to become LYNRED. The Lynred workforce numbers 1,000 and the company is focused on several markets: defense, space, security and surveillance, leisure, industry and automotive.

LYNRED's MCT IR detectors are being used by space agencies to observe deep space, observe the Earth, monitor the environment, and provide data on meteorological phenomena. Other LYNRED detectors are being used in thermal infrared cameras, missile seekers, research and development as well as surveillance and targeting equipment.

== History ==
Sofradir was established in 1986 by Thales, Sagem and CEA-Leti. The goal of establishing Sofradir was to create an organization that developed and produced IR detectors based on the focal plane array (FPA) technology developed at CEA-Leti. The Infrared Laboratory (Laboratoire InfraRouge) located within the public research institute at CEA-Leti located in Grenoble, France was established to perform research in order to develop future generations of FPAs. Sofradir was to bring these new generations of IR detectors to mature production levels.

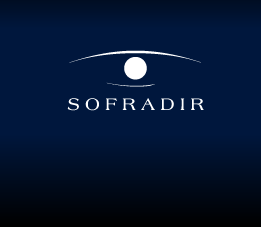
Former logo of Sofradir before LYNRED

Sofradir headquarters are located in Chatenay-Malabry (near Paris) while the development and production facilities are located in Veurey-Voroize near Grenoble. These facilities first became operational by October 1987 with MCT technologies transferred to it from the CEA-Leti infrared laboratories.

Sofradir was initially headed by Jean Louis Teszner from 1986 until end of 2000. Because of Teszner's significant experience, Sofradir quickly became the largest producer of MCT products in Europe due primarily to the research transferred to it from CEA-Leti. Low rate initial production of certain infrared detectors began in 1991, with mass production beginning in 1994. In parallel, the first space program (HELIOS II) also began in 1994, launching space activity at Sofradir.

In 2000, Sofradir was headed by Philippe Bensussan as chairman and CEO. Sofradir continued its development and production with second generation (TDI scanning) and third generation (staring) infrared detectors as well as others. The company also participated in the production of high performance infrared common modules (SADA II) for the US Army as well as 2D staring arrays mainly for use with missiles.

At the beginning of 2000, Sofradir began delivering QWIP detectors in cooperation with Thales Research and Technologies (TRT) and uncooled products based on the microbolometers technology which had been developed at CEA-Leti. Following these first deliveries, ULIS (a subsidiary of Sofradir at 85%) was established. (General Electric owns the remaining 15% of ULIS). ULIS would ultimately become the second-largest producer of microbolometer-based thermal imaging sensors.

Sofradir continued to increase the size of its facilities, in 2008 increasing the area by 50% including a 70% increase in area for clean rooms. In December 2008, Sofradir acquired Electrophysics Corp., renamed Sofradir EC, Inc., in Fairfield NJ USA. The acquisition was expected to accelerate the development of Sofradir and its subsidiary ULIS in the North American market.

In January 2019, Sofradir and its subsidiary Ulis confirmed their participation in the Nano 2022 program, the French component of the European IPCEI plan on nanoelectronics. The company plans to invest €150 million in this program over five years (2018–2022).

In June 2019, Sofradir (750 employees) and its subsidiary ULIS (200 employees) announced their merger and new company name: LYNRED. The US entity remains a subsidiary and has been renamed Lynred USA.

Post-merger LYNRED remains a jointly owned (50/50) subsidiary of Thales and Safran. The company currently develops and commercializes several IR technologies: microbolometers, InGaAs and MCT (Mercury Cadmium Telluride, also abbreviated as HgCdTe). LYNRED’s infrared detector portfolio covers the entire infrared electromagnetic spectrum, from SWIR to VLWIR.

In 2023, Lynred invested 85 million euros in its new Campus infrared technology production site, to meet the growing needs of both the military and automotive markets.

In December 2023, Hervé Bouaziz is appointed Executive President of Lynred, and Xavier Caillouet becomes CEO.

== Accomplishments ==
Sofradir pioneered the development of second- and third-generation IR detectors. It was one of the first to produce second-generation IR detectors. Second-generation IR detectors have a high level of sophistication because they require the integration of readout electronics on the Focal Plane Array (FPA) as well as signal processing. Sofradir was the first European IR detector manufacturer to have achieved space-deployed products, which are currently in orbit on Venus Express. Sofradir continues to produce highly specialized products such as those used in space applications In addition, Sofradir also produces infrared detector arrays for high volume production contracts.

Sofradir is also advancing the development of third-generation IR detectors made from MCT layers using the Molecular Beam Epitaxy (MBE) techniques. The MBE technique enables the development of a new class of IR detectors including dual-band and avalanche photodiode detector (APD).

LYNRED is the first European IR detector manufacturer to supply space-deployed products, currently in orbit on Venus Express. LYNRED continues to produce highly specialized products such as those used in space applications. The company has equipped dozens of space programs that have flown or are still in flight (Hayabusa, Sentinel 2, Sentinel 5 precursor, SGLI, Exomars, Prisma, Chandrayaan...).
