= Aluminium arsenide antimonide =

Chemical compound

Aluminium arsenide antimonide, or AlAsSb (AlAs_{1-x}Sb_{x}), is a ternary III-V semiconductor compound. It can be considered as an alloy between aluminium arsenide and aluminium antimonide. The alloy can contain any ratio between arsenic and antimony. AlAsSb refers generally to any composition of the alloy.

== Preparation ==
AlAsSb films have been grown by molecular beam epitaxy and metalorganic chemical vapor deposition on gallium arsenide, gallium antimonide and indium arsenide substrates. It is typically incorporated into layered heterostructures with other III-V compounds.

== Structural and Electronic Properties ==
Dependence of the direct and indirect band gaps of AlAsSb on composition at room temperature (T = 300 K).

The room temperature (T = 300 K) bandgap and lattice constant of AlAsSb alloys are between those of pure AlAs (a = 0.566 nm, E_{g} = 2.16 eV) and AlSb (a = 0.614 nm, E_{g} = 1.62 eV). Over all compositions, the bandgap is indirect, like it is in pure AlAs and AlSb. AlAsSb shares the same zincblende crystal structure as AlAs and AlSb.

== Applications ==
AlAsSb can be lattice-matched to GaSb, InAs and InP substrates, making it useful for heterostructures grown on these substrates.

AlAsSb is occasionally employed as a wide-bandgap barrier layer in InAsSb-based infrared barrier photodetectors. In these devices, a thin layer of AlAsSb is grown between doped, smaller-bandgap InAsSb layers. These device geometries are frequently referred to as "nbn" or "nbp" photodetectors, indicating a sequence of an n-doped layer, followed by a barrier layer, followed by an n- or p-doped layer. A large discontinuity is introduced into the conduction band minimum by the AlAsSb barrier layer, which restricts the flow of electrons (but not holes) through the photodetector in a manner that reduces the photodetector's dark current and improves its noise characteristics.
