= Institut National d'Optique =

National Optics Institute (INO)
- Industry: Aerospace; Astronomy; Agrifood; Biomedicine; Defense/Security; Electronics; Environment; Information Technology; Manufacturing; Natural Resources; Optics and Photonics; Telecommunications; Transport
- Founded: 1985
- Headquarters: Quebec City, Quebec, Canada
- Revenue: ▲$37.6 million(2011-2012)
- Net income: ▲$489,457(2011-2012)
- Number of employees: ≈ 200 (2012)

The National Optics Institute (INO) is a Quebec City-based private non-profit corporation founded in 1988. INO is a technological design and development firm that deals in optics and photonics for SMEs and large corporations in Canada and around the world. INO has 147 patents granted. In addition, over 103 other patent applications have been submitted and are awaiting approval. INO was recognized as a Centre of Excellence and Innovation by the Canadian government.

== History ==
INO was officially created in 1985 at the instigation of the Université Laval, which, at the time, accounted for half of Canada's researchers in optics/photonics, as well as the Canadian Association of Physicists, the Natural Sciences and Engineering Research Council of Canada and various partners in the Quebec City area. Its function is to be a centre of expertise in optics and photonics and to assist companies in acquiring a competitive edge and developing their business. INO aims to generate at least one spinoff company every year out of its scientific and technological research. The company has offices in Quebec City, Montreal, Hamilton and Edmonton.

INO was a pioneer in optics/photonics research for industrial development purposes, and today it is Canada’s leading centre for industrial research and commercialization. The processes and applications it has developed by combining optics and photonics have helped many Canadian companies stay competitive in their respective fields.

INO started its operations in 1988.

== Expertise ==
INO's technology and research programs include: Energy and Natural Resources, Defense and Security, MEMS and Microfabrication, Advanced Manufacturing, Environment, Optical Design, Vision, Lasers and Sources, as well as Biophotonics.

Since its creation, INO has helped create 28 companies, made 50 technology transfers to the industry, and carried out some 4,500 service contracts for businesses of all sizes. INO possesses a wide range of expertise: astronomy, biophotonics, microbolometers, fiber sensors, laser micromachining, fiber lasers, LIDAR, MEMS/MOEMS, microfabrication, optical design, specialty optical fibers, space and astronomy, vision and 3D sensors.

INO is a licensed microbolometer manufacturer.

== Company structure ==
INO is administered by a board of directors and advisory committee composed of experts in the field. The 18 members of the board are from the private sector as well as various universities and areas of government. INO has more than 200 employees, 80% of whom possess high-level scientific and technical training, such as: physicists, optical designers, electrical engineers, mechanical engineers, production/quality engineers, programmers, technologists, machinists and specialized technical assistants.

== International Society for Professional Innovation Management (ISPIM) ==
The first ISPIM took place in Singapore in December 2008 and was followed by a second event in New York City in December 2009. The idea behind the symposium was to hold an event outside of Europe, which is traditionally where the main ISPIM symposium takes place. Delegate numbers have steadily increased, and 185 people attended the New York event.

INO was host to the 3rd ISPIM symposium. Held from December 13 to 15 2010 at the Quebec City Convention Centre, the symposium allowed approximately 150 academics, business leaders, consultants and other professionals involved in innovation management from over 40 countries to exchange ideas and develop new paths for partnership.

== See also ==
- Charles Beaulieu
