= MZT =

MZT may refer to:

- Mercury zinc telluride
- Mazatlán International Airport (IATA Code: MZT) in Mazatlán, Mexico
- An acronym used by the Chinese Communist Party to describe Mao Zedong Thought
- Maternal to zygotic transition
- Macedonian basketball club KK MZT Skopje
