= Mercury zinc telluride =

Telluride of mercury and zinc

Mercury zinc telluride (HgZnTe, MZT) is a telluride of mercury and zinc, an alloy of mercury telluride and zinc telluride. It is a narrow-gap semiconductor material.

Mercury zinc telluride is used in infrared detectors and arrays for infrared imaging and infrared astronomy.

Mercury zinc telluride has better chemical, thermal, and mechanical stability than mercury cadmium telluride. The bandgap of MZT is more sensitive to composition fluctuations than that of MCT, which may be an issue for reproducible device fabrication. MZT is less amenable than MCT to fabrication of complex heterostructures by molecular beam epitaxy.

== See also ==
- Cadmium zinc telluride
- Mercury cadmium telluride
