= Roic =

ROIC may refer to:

- Return on invested capital
- Readout integrated circuit
