= Indium arsenide antimonide =

Mineral alloy

Indium arsenide antimonide, also known as indium antimonide arsenide or InAsSb (InAs_{1-x}Sb_{x}), is a ternary III-V semiconductor compound. It can be considered as an alloy between indium arsenide (InAs) and indium antimonide (InSb). The alloy can contain any ratio between arsenic and antimony. InAsSb refers generally to any composition of the alloy.

== Preparation ==
InAsSb films have been grown by molecular beam epitaxy (MBE), metalorganic vapor phase epitaxy (MOVPE) and liquid phase epitaxy (LPE) on gallium arsenide and gallium antimonide substrates. It is often incorporated into layered heterostructures with other III-V compounds.

=== Thermodynamic stability ===
Between 524 °C and 942 °C (the melting points of pure InSb and InAs, respectively), InAsSb can exist at a two-phase liquid-solid equilibrium, depending on temperature and average composition of the alloy.

InAsSb possesses an additional miscibility gap at temperatures below approximately 503 °C. This means that intermediate compositions of the alloy below this temperature are thermodynamically unstable and can spontaneously separate into two phases: one InAs-rich and one InSb-rich. This limits the compositions of InAsSb that can be obtained by near-equilibrium growth techniques, such as LPE, to those outside of the miscibility gap. However, compositions of InAsSb within the miscibility gap can be obtained with non-equilibrium growth techniques, such as MBE and MOVPE. By carefully selecting the growth conditions and maintaining relatively low temperatures during and after growth, it is possible to obtain compositions of InAsSb within the miscibility gap that are kinetically stable.

== Electronic properties ==
InAsSb bandgap in electron volts as a function of composition (x) and temperature (K).

InAsSb bandgap in electron volts as a function of composition (x) at 300 K (room temperature, blue line) and 77 K (liquid nitrogen temperature, red line).

The bandgap and lattice constant of InAsSb alloys are between those of pure InAs (a = 0.606 nm, E_{g} = 0.35 eV) and InSb (a = 0.648 nm, E_{g} = 0.17 eV). Over all compositions, the band gap is direct, like in InAs and InSb. The direct bandgap displays strong bowing, reaching a minimum with respect to composition at approximately x = 0.62 at room temperature and lower temperatures. The following empirical relationship has been suggested for the direct bandgap of InAsSb in eV as a function of composition (0 < x < 1) and temperature (in Kelvin):

$E_{g}(x,T) = 0.417 - (1.28\cdot 10^{-4})T - (2.6\cdot 10^{-7})T^{2} - x(C + 0.182 + (10^{-9})T^{2}) + x^{2}(C - (5.8\cdot 10^{-4}) + (10^{-7})T^{2})$

This equation is plotted in the figures, using a suggested bowing parameter of C = 0.75 eV. Slightly different relations have also been suggested for E_{g} as a function of composition and temperature, depending on the material quality, strain, and defect density.

== Applications ==
Because of its small direct bandgap, InAsSb has been extensively studied over the last few decades, predominantly for use in mid- to long-wave infrared photodetectors that operate at room temperature and cryogenic temperatures. InAsSb is used as the active material in some commercially available infrared photodetectors. Depending on the heterostructure and detector configuration that is used, InAsSb-based detectors can operate at wavelengths ranging from approximately 2 μm to 11 μm.

== See also ==
- Mercury cadmium telluride - a ternary II-VI compound that has a widely tunable bandgap and is used in commercial mid- and long-wave infrared photodetectors.
- Aluminium arsenide antimonide - a ternary III-V compound that is used as a barrier material in some InAsSb-based photodetectors.
