= Aluminium indium antimonide =

Aluminium indium antimonide, also known as indium aluminium antimonide or AlInSb (Al_{x}In_{1-x}Sb), is a ternary III-V semiconductor compound. It can be considered as an alloy between aluminium antimonide and indium antimonide. The alloy can contain any ratio between aluminium and indium. AlInSb refers generally to any composition of the alloy.

== Preparation ==
AlInSb films have been grown by molecular beam epitaxy and metalorganic chemical vapor deposition on gallium arsenide and gallium antimonide substrates. It is typically incorporated into layered heterostructures with other III-V compounds.

== Electronic Properties ==
Dependence of the direct and indirect band gaps of AlInSb on composition at room temperature (T = 300 K).

The bandgap and lattice constant of AlInSb alloys are between those of pure AlSb (a = 0.614 nm, E_{g} = 1.62 eV) and InSb (a = 0.648 nm, E_{g} = 0.17 eV). At an intermediate composition (approximately x = 0.72 – 0.73), the bandgap transitions from an indirect gap, like that of pure AlSb, to a direct gap, like that of pure InSb.

== Applications ==
AlInSb has been employed as a barrier material and dislocation filter for InSb quantum wells and in InSb-based devices.

AlInSb has been used as the active region of LEDs and photodiodes to generate and detect light at mid-infrared wavelengths. These devices can be optimized for performance around 3.3 μm, a wavelength of interest for methane gas sensing.
