= Aluminium indium arsenide =

Aluminium indium arsenide, also indium aluminium arsenide or AlInAs (Al_{x}In_{1−x}As), is a ternary III-V semiconductor compound with very nearly the same lattice constant as InGaAs, but a larger bandgap. It can be considered as an alloy between aluminium arsenide (AlAs) and indium arsenide (InAs). AlInAs refers generally to any composition of the alloy.

== Structural and Electronic Properties ==
Dependence of the direct and indirect band gaps of AlInAs on composition at room temperature (T = 300 K).

The bandgap and lattice constant of AlInAs alloys are between those of pure AlAs (a = 0.566 nm, E_{g} = 2.16 eV) and InAs (a = 0.606 nm, E_{g} = 0.42 eV). At a composition of approximately x = 0.64, the band gap transitions between direct and indirect.

AlInAs shares the same zincblende crystal structure as AlAs and InAs.

== Applications ==
Aluminium indium arsenide is used e.g. as a buffer layer in metamorphic HEMT transistors, where it serves to adjust the lattice constant differences between the GaAs substrate and the GaInAs channel. It can be also used to form alternate layers with indium gallium arsenide, which act as quantum wells; these structures are used in, e.g., broadband quantum cascade lasers.

== Safety and toxicity aspects ==
The toxicology of AlInAs has not been fully investigated. The dust is an irritant to skin, eyes and lungs. The environment, health and safety aspects of aluminium indium arsenide sources (such as trimethylindium and arsine) and industrial hygiene monitoring studies of standard MOVPE sources have been reported recently in a review.
