= Charles Beaulieu =

Canadian academic

- Born: July 5, 1930 (age 95); Amqui, Quebec
- Occupations: academic, civil servant, and businessman
- Awards: Order of Canada; National Order of Quebec

Charles E. Beaulieu, OC CQ (born July 5, 1930) is a Canadian academic, civil servant, and businessman.

Born in Amqui, Quebec, he received a Bachelor of Arts in 1951, a Bachelor of Science in 1956, and a Ph.D. in 1960 from Université Laval.

From 1961 to 1968, he was a Professor of Metallurgy at Université Laval and was Head of the Department of Mining and Metallurgy from 1966 to 1969. From 1969 to 1970, he was the first Director of the Université du Québec à Rimouski. From 1970 to 1976, he was the founding Director of the National Institute of Science Research at the Université du Québec and served as Vice-President Education and Research from 1976 to 1979.

In 1979, he joined the Quebec civil service and became Deputy Minister (Mines) for the Department of Energy and Resources. In 1982, he was Deputy Minister in the Department of Industry and Commerce. From 1988 to 1994, he was Chairman and CEO of the National Optics Institute, a private non-profit organization specializing in business applications for optics and photonics. In 1995, he was appointed Chairman and President of the mining company, Sidbec-Normines.

In 1996, he was made an Officer of the Order of Canada for being "one of our country's most respected figures". In 1998, he was made a Knight of the National Order of Quebec.
