= Infrared detector =

Detector that reacts to infrared (IR) radiation

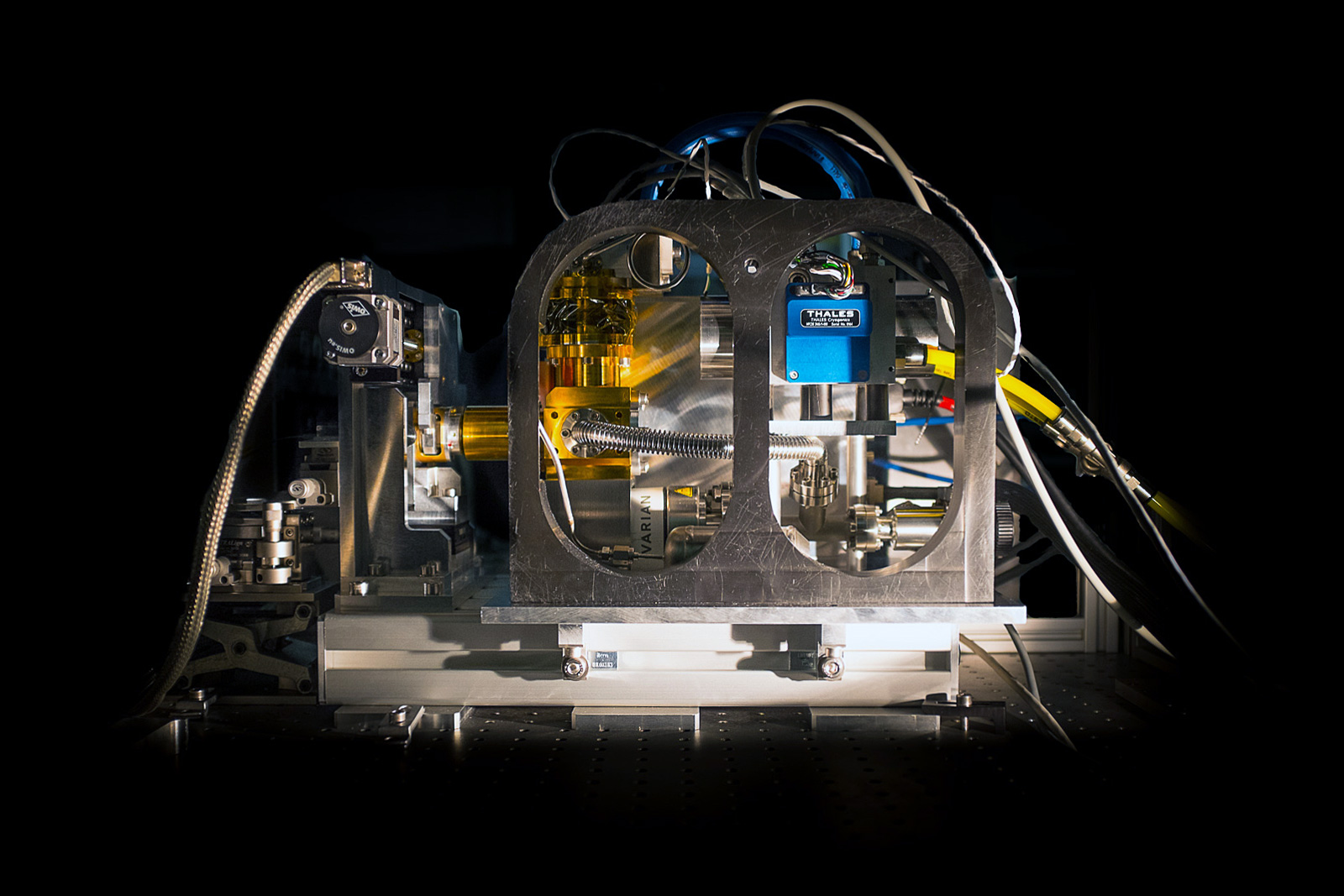
Prototype of high-speed infrared detector installed on the PIONIER instrument at ESO’s Paranal Observatory.

An infrared detector is a detector that reacts to infrared (IR) radiation. The two main types of detectors are thermal and photonic (photodetectors).

The thermal effects of the incident IR radiation can be followed through many temperature dependent phenomena. Bolometers and microbolometers are based on changes in resistance. Thermocouples and thermopiles use the thermoelectric effect. Golay cells follow thermal expansion. In IR spectrometers the pyroelectric detectors are the most widespread.

The response time and sensitivity of photonic detectors can be much higher, but usually these have to be cooled to cut thermal noise. The materials in these are semiconductors with narrow band gaps. Incident IR photons can cause electronic excitations. In photoconductive detectors, the resistivity of the detector element is monitored. Photovoltaic detectors contain a p-n junction on which photoelectric current appears upon illumination.

An infrared detector is hybridized by connecting it to a readout integrated circuit with indium bumps. This hybrid is known as a focal plane array.

== Detector materials ==
The materials basis for infrared detection devices are narrow-gap semiconductors, including compounds and alloys of bismuth, antimony, indium, cadmium, selenium and others.

- Lead(II) sulfide (PbS)
- Mercury cadmium telluride (Known as MCT, HgCdTe)
- Indium antimonide (InSb)
- Indium arsenide
- Indium gallium arsenide
- Lead selenide
- QWIP
- Lithium tantalate (LiTaO_{3})
- Triglycine sulfate (TGS)
- Platinum silicide (PtSi)

== See also ==
- Infrared imaging
