= Quantum well infrared photodetector =

Electronic device

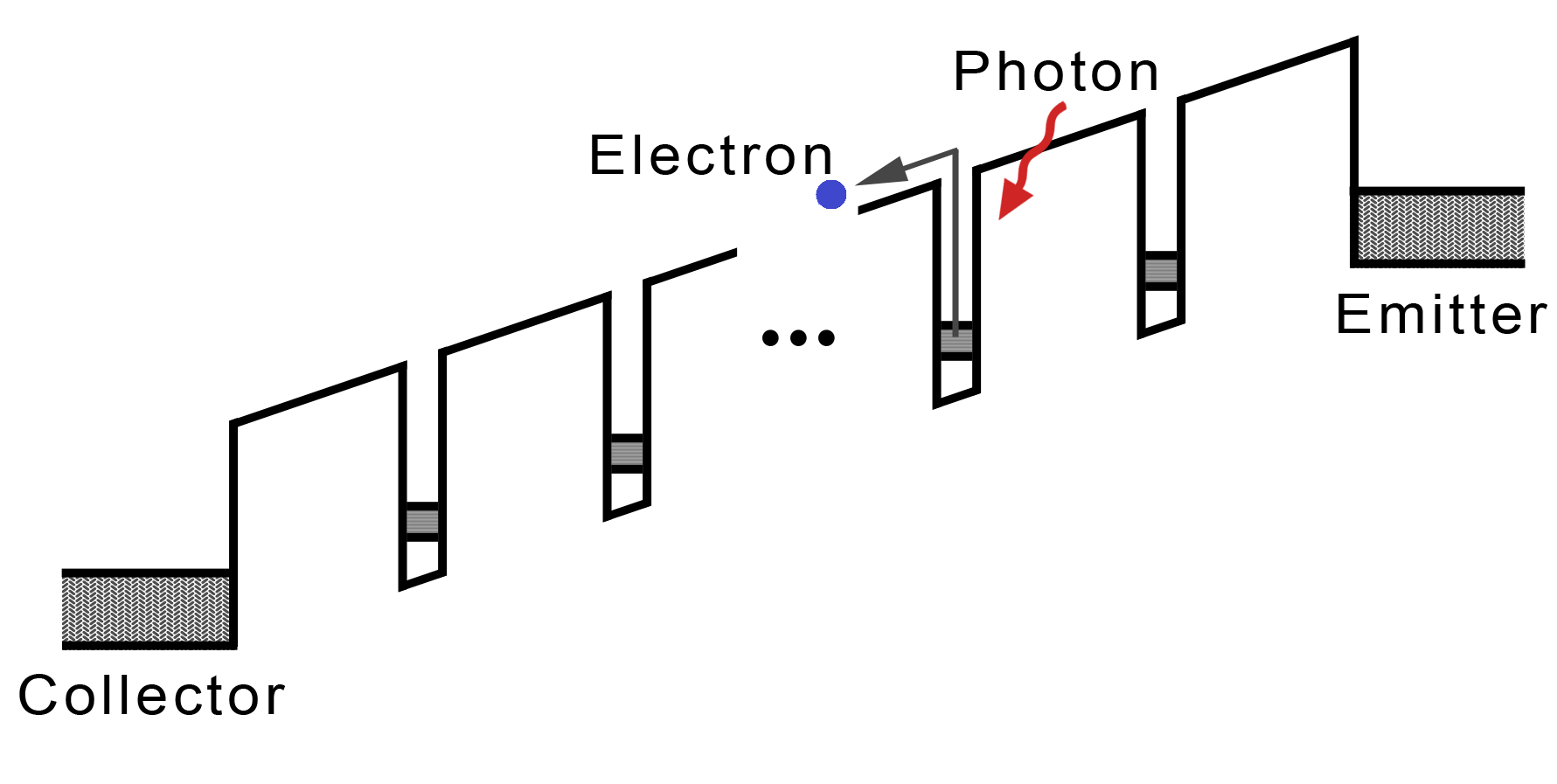
Conduction band profile of a photoconductive QWIP. The conduction band profile is tilted as a bias voltage is applied.

A quantum well infrared photodetector (QWIP) is an infrared photodetector, which uses electronic intersubband transitions in quantum wells to absorb photons. In order to be used for infrared detection, the parameters of the quantum wells in the quantum well infrared photodetector are adjusted so that the energy difference between its first and second quantized states match the incoming infrared photon energy. QWIPs are typically made of gallium arsenide, a material commonly found in smartphones and high-speed communications equipment. Depending on the material and the design of the quantum wells, the energy levels of the QWIP can be tailored to absorb radiation in the infrared region from 3 to 20 μm.

QWIPs are one of the simplest quantum mechanical device structures that can detect mid-wavelength and long-wavelength infrared radiation. They are known for their stability, high pixel-to-pixel uniformity, and high-pixel operability.

== History ==
In 1985, Stephen Eglash and Lawrence West observed strong intersubband transition in multiple quantum wells (MQW) that prompted more serious consideration into using quantum wells for infrared detectors. Previously, attempts to use quantum wells for infrared detection were based on free absorption in quantum wells that bring the electrons over the top of the barriers. However, resulting detectors displayed low sensitivity.

By 1987, the basic operating principles for a quantum well infrared photodetector that demonstrated sensitive infrared detection were formulated. In 1990, the low-temperature sensitivity of the technology was further improved by increasing the barrier thickness, which suppressed the tunneling current. At this point, these devices were formally known as quantum well infrared photodetectors. In 1991, the first infrared image was obtained using this approach.

In 2002, researchers at the U.S. Army Research Laboratory (ARL) developed a voltage-tunable, two-color QWIP with effective wavelength switching for remote temperature sensing. The instrument exhibited a peak detection wavelength of 7.5 micrometers for positive bias at 10 K when the electrons resided in one of the quantum wells and switched to 8.8 micrometers at a large negative bias when the electrons were transferred to the other well.

Yet despite its use in civilian applications, QWIP technology was considered insufficient by the U.S. military for military use. At the time, the photodetectors could only sense the one-dimensional quantization when the light traveled in parallel to the material layers, which typically occurred when light was shined at the edge of the detector. As a result, the QWIP technology had a quantum efficiency of only 5 percent. In addition, the reflection gratings commonly used in the industry to alleviate this problem were made of very fine periodic posts and were difficult to produce in large formats.

To address this problem, researchers at the Army Research Laboratory developed the corrugated quantum infrared photodetector (C-QWIP) in 2008, which used micromirrors on the photodetector to increase the effectiveness of redirecting the light onto the quantum well region at any wavelength. In essence, the 45-degree inclined detector sidewalls allowed light to be reflected parallel to the material layers to produce an electrical signal. Tests conducted by researchers at ARL and L-3 Communications Cincinnati Electronics determined that the C-QWIP demonstrated bandwidths exceeding 3 micrometers, which was 5 times wider than the commercial QWIP at the time. Since C-QWIPs can be manufactured using gallium arsenide, they served as a more affordable alternative to conventional infrared detectors for Army helicopters without sacrificing resolution and requiring less calibration and maintenance.

In February 2013, NASA launched a satellite that featured the Thermal Infrared Sensor (TIRS) instrument as part of its Landsat Data Continuity Mission. The TIRS utilized three C-QWIPs designed by the Army Research Laboratory to detect long wavelengths of light emitted by the Earth and track how the planet's water and land are being used. This application marked the first time a QWIP was used in space.

== Function ==
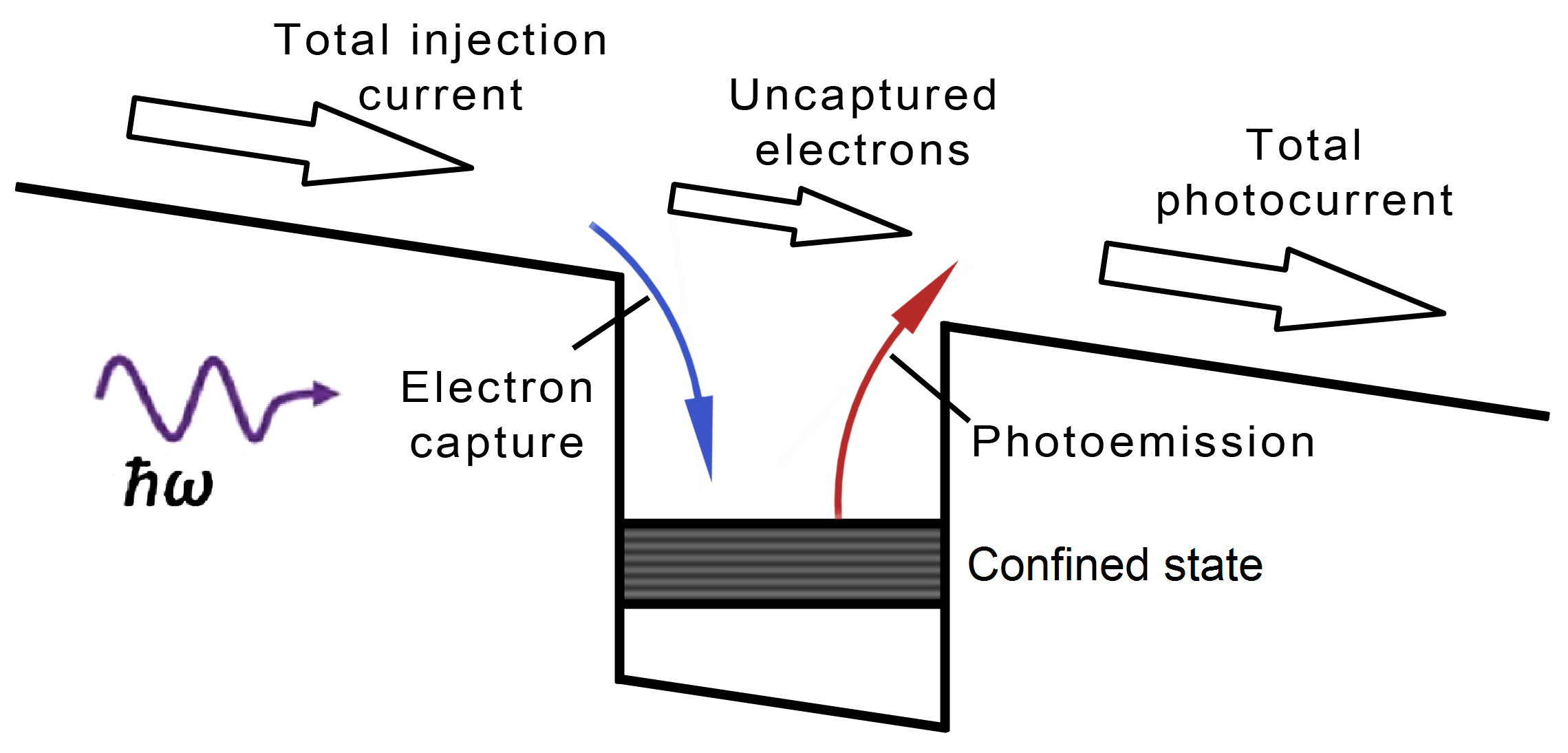
Photoconductive gain in a quantum well infrared photodetector. To balance the loss of electrons from the quantum well, electrons are injected from the top emitter contact. Since the capture probability is smaller than one, extra electrons need to be injected and the total photocurrent can become larger than the photoemission current.

Infrared detectors generally work by detecting the radiation emitted by an object, and the intensity of the radiation is determined by factors such as the object's temperature, distance, and size. Unlike most infrared photodetectors, QWIPs are independent of the band gap of the detecting material, because they are based on the optical transition within a single energy band. As a result, it can be used to detect objects with much lower energy radiation than what was previously possible.

The basic elements of a QWIP are quantum wells, which are separated by barriers. The quantum wells are designed to have one confined state inside the well and a first excited state which aligns with the top of the barrier. The wells are n-doped such that the ground state is filled with electrons. The barriers are wide enough to prevent quantum tunneling between the quantum wells. Typical QWIPs consists of 20 to 50 quantum wells. When a bias voltage is applied to the QWIP, the entire conduction band is tilted. Without light the electrons in the quantum wells just sit in the ground state. When the QWIP is illuminated with light of the same or higher energy as the intersubband transition energy, an electron is excited.

Once the electron is in an excited state, it can escape into the continuum and be measured as photocurrent. To externally measure a photocurrent the electrons need to be extracted by applying an electric field to the quantum wells. The efficiency of this absorption and extraction process depends on several parameters.

This video shows the evolution of taking the quantum-well infrared photodetector (QWIP) from inception, to testing on the ground and from a plane, and ultimately to a NASA science mission.

Photocurrent

Assuming that the detector is illuminated with a photon flux $\phi$ (number of photons per unit time), the photocurrent $I_{ph}$ is

$I_{ph}=e\phi\eta g_{ph}$

where $e$ is the elementary charge, $\eta$ is the absorption efficiency and $g_{ph}$ is the photoconductive gain. $\eta$ and $g_{ph}$ are the probabilities for a photon to add an electron to the photocurrent, also called quantum efficiency. $\eta$ is the probability of a photon exciting an electron, and $g_{ph}$ depends on the electronic transport properties.

Photoconductive gain

The photoconductive gain $g_{ph}$ is the probability that an excited electron contributes to the photocurrent—or more generally, the number of electrons in the external circuit, divided by the number of quantum well electrons that absorb a photon. Although it might be counterintuitive at first, it is possible for $g_{ph}$ to be larger than one. Whenever an electron is excited and extracted as photocurrent, an extra electron is injected from the opposite (emitter) contact to balance the loss of electrons from the quantum well. In general the capture probability $p_{c}\leq1$, so an injected electron might sometimes pass over the quantum well and into the opposite contact. In that case, yet another electron is injected from the emitter contact to balance the charge, and again heads towards the well where it might or might not get captured, and so on, until eventually an electron is captured in the well. In this way, $g_{ph}$ can become larger than one.

The exact value of $g_{ph}$ is determined by the ratio of capture probability $p_{c}$ and escape probability $p_{e}$.

$g_{ph}=\frac{p_{e}}{N\, p_{c}}$

where $N$ is the number of quantum wells. The number of quantum wells appears only in the denominator, as it increases the capture probability $p_{c}$, but not the escape probability $p_{e}$.

== See also ==
- Mercury cadmium telluride
- Microbolometer
- Thermography
