= Mercury cadmium telluride =

Alloy

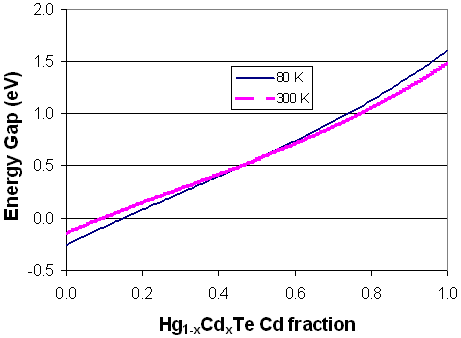
Energy gap as a function of cadmium composition.

Hg_{1−x}Cd_{x}Te or mercury cadmium telluride (also cadmium mercury telluride, MCT, MerCad Telluride, MerCadTel, MerCaT or CMT) is a chemical compound of cadmium telluride (CdTe) and mercury telluride (HgTe) with a tunable bandgap spanning the shortwave infrared to the very long wave infrared regions.

The amount of cadmium (Cd) in the alloy can be chosen so as to tune the optical absorption of the material to the desired infrared wavelength. CdTe is a semiconductor with a bandgap of approximately 1.5 eV at room temperature. HgTe is a semimetal, which means that its bandgap energy is zero. Mixing these two substances allows one to obtain any bandgap between 0 and 1.5 eV.

== Properties ==
=== Physical ===
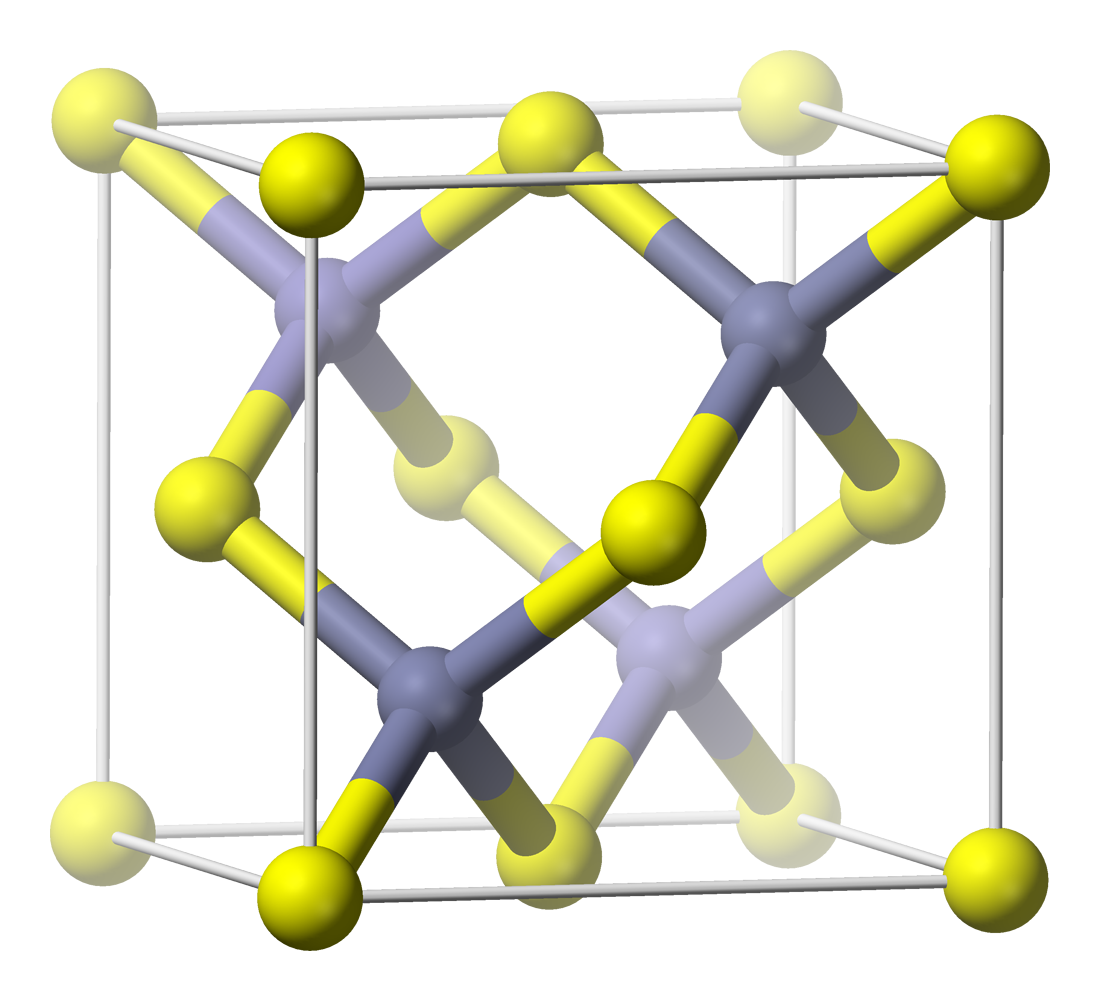
A zincblende unit cell

Hg_{1−x}Cd_{x}Te has a zincblende structure with two interpenetrating face-centered cubic lattices offset by (1/4,1/4,1/4)a_{o} in the primitive cell. The cations Cd and Hg are statistically mixed on the yellow sublattice while the Te anions form the grey sublattice in the image.

=== Electronic ===
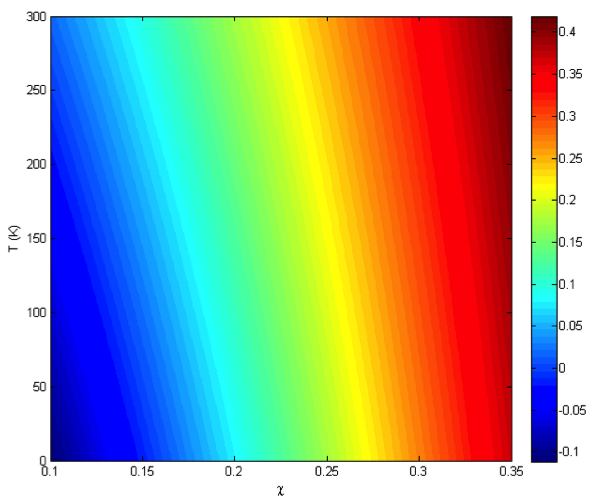
HgCdTe bandgap in electron volts as a function of x composition and temperature

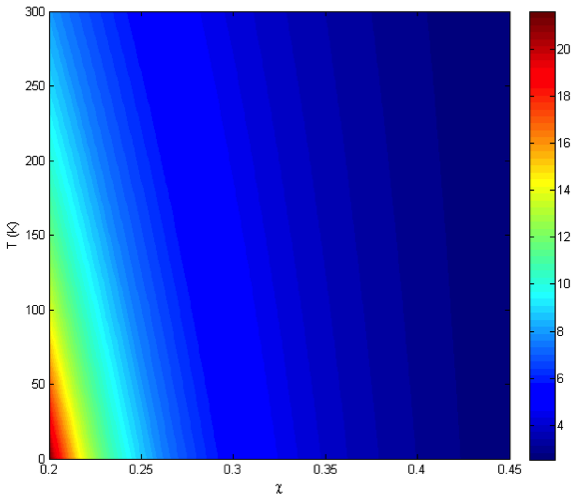
HgCdTe cutoff wavelength in μm as function of x composition and temperature.

Relationship between bandgap and cutoff wavelength

The electron mobility of HgCdTe with a large Hg content is very high. Among common semiconductors used for infrared detection, only InSb and InAs surpass electron mobility of HgCdTe at room temperature. At 80 K, the electron mobility of Hg_{0.8}Cd_{0.2}Te can be several hundred thousand cm^{2}/(V·s). Electrons also have a long ballistic length at this temperature; their mean free path can be several micrometres.

The intrinsic carrier concentration is given by

$$n_{i}(T,x) = (5.585 - 3.82x + (1.753\cdot 10^{-3})T - 1.364\cdot 10^{-3}T\cdot x)\cdot( 10^{14}\cdot E_\text{g}^{3/4}\cdot T^{3/2} \cdot e^{\frac{-E_\text{g}}{2kT}})$$

where k is the Boltzmann constant, q is the elementary electric charge, T is the material temperature, x is the percentage of cadmium concentration, and E_{g} is the bandgap given by

$$E_\text{g}(T,x) = -0.302 + 1.93\cdot x+(5.35\cdot 10^{-4})\cdot T\cdot (1-2\cdot x)-0.81\cdot x^{2}+0.832\cdot x^{3}$$

Using the relationship $\lambda_\text{p} = \frac{1.24}{E_\text{g}}$, where λ is in μm and E_{g}. is in electron volts, one can also obtain the cutoff wavelength as a function of x and t:

$$\lambda_\text{p} = (-0.244 + 1.556\cdot x + (4.31\cdot 10^{-4})\cdot T\cdot (1-2\cdot x) - 0.65\cdot x^{2} + 0.671\cdot x^{3})^{-1}$$

==== Minority carrier lifetime ====
===== Auger recombination =====
Two types of Auger recombination affect HgCdTe: Auger 1 and Auger 7 recombination. Auger 1 recombination involves two electrons and one hole, where an electron and a hole combine and the remaining electron receives energy equal to or greater than the band gap. Auger 7 recombination is similar to Auger 1, but involves one electron and two holes.

The Auger 1 minority carrier lifetime for intrinsic (undoped) HgCdTe is given by

$$\tau_\text{Auger1}(T,x) = \frac{2.12\cdot 10^{-14}\cdot \sqrt{E_\text{g}(T,x)}\cdot e^{\frac{q\cdot E_\text{g}(T,x)}{kT}}}{\mathrm{FF}^{2}\cdot (\frac{kT}{q})^{1.5}}$$

where FF is the overlap integral (approximately 0.221).

The Auger 1 minority carrier lifetime for doped HgCdTe is given by

$$\tau_\text{Auger1(doped)}(T,x,n) = \frac{2\cdot \tau_\text{Auger1}(T,x)}{1+(\frac{n}{n_{i}(T,x)})^{2}}$$

where n is the equilibrium electron concentration.

The Auger 7 minority carrier lifetime for intrinsic HgCdTe is approximately 10 times longer than the Auger 1 minority carrier lifetime:

$$\tau_\text{Auger7}(T,x) = 10\cdot \tau_\text{Auger1}(T,x)$$

The Auger 7 minority carrier lifetime for doped HgCdTe is given by

$$\tau_\text{Auger7(doped)}(T,x,n) = \frac{2\cdot \tau_\text{Auger7}(T,x)}{1+(\frac{n_{i}(T,x)}{n})^{2}}$$

The total contribution of Auger 1 and Auger 7 recombination to the minority carrier lifetime is computed as

$$\tau_\text{Auger}(T,x) = \frac{\tau_\text{Auger1}(T,x)\cdot \tau_\text{Auger7}(T,x)}{\tau_\text{Auger1}(T,x)+ \tau_\text{Auger7}(T,x)}$$

=== Mechanical ===
HgCdTe is a soft material due to the weak bonds Hg forms with tellurium. It is a softer material than any common III–V semiconductor. The Mohs hardness of HgTe is 1.9, CdTe is 2.9 and Hg_{0.5}Cd_{0.5}Te is 4. The hardness of lead salts is lower still.

=== Thermal ===
The thermal conductivity of HgCdTe is low; at low cadmium concentrations it is as low as 0.2 W·K^{−1}⋅m^{−1}. This means that it is unsuitable for high power devices. Although infrared light-emitting diodes and lasers have been made in HgCdTe, they must be operated cold to be efficient. The specific heat capacity is 150 J·kg^{−1}⋅K^{−1}.

=== Optical ===
HgCdTe is transparent in the infrared at photon energies below the energy gap. The refractive index is high, reaching nearly 4 for HgCdTe with high Hg content.

== Infrared detection ==
HgCdTe is the only common material that can detect infrared radiation in both of the accessible atmospheric windows. These are from 3 to 5 μm (the mid-wave infrared window, abbreviated MWIR) and from 8 to 12 μm (the long-wave window, LWIR). Detection in the MWIR and LWIR windows is obtained using 30% [(Hg_{0.7}Cd_{0.3})Te] and 20% [(Hg_{0.8}Cd_{0.2})Te] cadmium respectively. HgCdTe can also detect in the short wave infrared SWIR atmospheric windows of 2.2 to 2.4 μm and 1.5 to 1.8 μm.

HgCdTe is a common material in photodetectors of Fourier transform infrared spectrometers. This is because of the large spectral range of HgCdTe detectors and also the high quantum efficiency. It is also found in military field, remote sensing and infrared astronomy research. Military technology has depended on HgCdTe for night vision. In particular, the US air force makes extensive use of HgCdTe on all aircraft, and to equip airborne smart bombs. A variety of heat-seeking missiles are also equipped with HgCdTe detectors. HgCdTe detector arrays can also be found at most of the worlds major research telescopes including several satellites. Many HgCdTe detectors (such as Hawaii and NICMOS detectors) are named after the astronomical observatories or instruments for which they were originally developed.

The main limitation of LWIR HgCdTe-based detectors is that they need cooling to temperatures near that of liquid nitrogen (77 K), to reduce noise due to thermally excited current carriers (see cooled infrared camera). MWIR HgCdTe cameras can be operated at temperatures accessible to thermoelectric coolers with a small performance penalty. Hence, HgCdTe detectors are relatively heavy compared to bolometers and require maintenance. On the other side, HgCdTe enjoys much higher speed of detection (frame rate) and is significantly more sensitive than some of its more economical competitors.

HgCdTe can be used as a heterodyne detector, in which the interference between a local source and returned laser light is detected. In this case it can detect sources such as CO_{2} lasers. In heterodyne detection mode HgCdTe can be uncooled, although greater sensitivity is achieved by cooling. Photodiodes, photoconductors or photoelectromagnetic (PEM) modes can be used. A bandwidth well in excess of 1 GHz can be achieved with photodiode detectors.

The main competitors of HgCdTe are less sensitive Si-based bolometers (see uncooled infrared camera), InSb and photon-counting superconducting tunnel junction (STJ) arrays. Quantum well infrared photodetectors (QWIP), manufactured from III–V semiconductor materials such as GaAs and AlGaAs, are another possible alternative, although their theoretical performance limits are inferior to HgCdTe arrays at comparable temperatures and they require the use of complicated reflection/diffraction gratings to overcome certain polarization exclusion effects which impact array responsivity. In the future, the primary competitor to HgCdTe detectors may emerge in the form of Quantum Dot Infrared Photodetectors (QDIP), based on either a colloidal or type-II superlattice structure. Unique 3-D quantum confinement effects, combined with the unipolar (non-exciton based photoelectric behavior) nature of quantum dots could allow comparable performance to HgCdTe at significantly higher operating temperatures. Initial laboratory work has shown promising results in this regard and QDIPs may be one of the first significant nanotechnology products to emerge.

In HgCdTe, detection occurs when an infrared photon of sufficient energy kicks an electron from the valence band to the conduction band. Such an electron is collected by a suitable external readout integrated circuits (ROIC) and transformed into an electric signal. The physical mating of the HgCdTe detector array to the ROIC is often referred to as a "focal plane array".

In contrast, in a bolometer, light heats up a tiny piece of material. The temperature change of the bolometer results in a change in resistance which is measured and transformed into an electric signal.

Mercury zinc telluride has better chemical, thermal, and mechanical stability characteristics than HgCdTe. It has a steeper change of energy gap with mercury composition than HgCdTe, making compositional control harder.

== HgCdTe growth techniques ==
=== Bulk crystal growth ===
The first large scale growth method was bulk recrystallization of a liquid melt. This was the main growth method from the late 1950s to the early 1970s.

=== Epitaxial growth ===
Highly pure and crystalline HgCdTe is fabricated by epitaxy on either CdTe or CdZnTe substrates. CdZnTe is a compound semiconductor, the lattice parameter of which can be exactly matched to that of HgCdTe. This eliminates most defects from the epilayer of HgCdTe. CdTe was developed as an alternative substrate in the '90s. It is not lattice-matched to HgCdTe, but is much cheaper, as it can be grown by epitaxy on silicon (Si) or germanium (Ge) substrates.

Liquid phase epitaxy (LPE), in which a CdZnTe substrate is lowered and spinning on top of the surface of a slowly cooling liquid HgCdTe melt. This gives the best results in terms of crystalline quality, and is still a common technique of choice for industrial production.

In recent years, molecular beam epitaxy (MBE) has become widespread because of its ability to stack up layers of different alloy composition. This allows simultaneous detection at several wavelengths. Furthermore, MBE, and also MOVPE, allow growth on large area substrates such as CdTe on Si or Ge, whereas LPE does not allow such substrates to be used.

== Toxicity ==
Mercury cadmium telluride is known to be a toxic material, with additional danger from the high vapor pressure of mercury at the material's melting point; in spite of this, it continues to be developed and used in its applications.

== See also ==
=== Related materials ===
- Mercury telluride, Cadmium telluride, Mercury zinc telluride.

=== Other infrared detection materials ===
- Indium antimonide, Indium arsenide, Indium arsenide antimonide, Lead selenide, QWIP

=== Other ===
- Infrared, thermography.
