= Focal-plane array (radio astronomy) =

Focal-plane arrays (FPAs) are widely used in radio astronomy. FPAs are arrays of receivers placed at the focus of the optical system in a radio-telescope. The optical system may be a reflector or a lens. Traditional radio-telescopes have only one receiver at the focus of the telescope, but radio-telescopes are now starting to be equipped with focal plane arrays, which are of three different types: multi-beam feed arrays, bolometer arrays, and the experimental phased-array feeds.

== Multi-beam feed arrays ==
Multi-beam feed arrays consist of a small array of feed horns at the focus of a radio-telescope. Each feed horn is connected to a receiver to measure the received power and each horn and receiver pair is sensitive to radio waves from a slightly different direction in the sky. A feed array with n receivers will increase the survey speed of the telescope by a factor of n, making them very powerful survey instruments. Because radio wavelengths are large, the resulting feed arrays are amongst the largest radio-astronomy receivers ever built. Examples include the multi-beam arrays on the Parkes Observatory, and the ALFA array at Arecibo Observatory, both of which have been used for major pulsar and Hydrogen line studies, such as HIPASS.

== Bolometer arrays ==
Bolometer arrays are arrays of bolometer receivers which measure the energy of incoming radio photons. They are typically used for astronomy at millimeter wavelengths. Examples include the SCUBA receiver on the James Clerk Maxwell Telescope and the LABOCA instrument on the APEX telescope.

== Phased array feeds ==
Phased Array Feeds are an experimental type of focal plane array using phased array technology in which antenna elements are closely spaced so that they do not act independently, but instead act as sensors of the electromagnetic field across the focal plane of the telescope. The outputs of the receivers are then coherently combined in a beamformer with appropriate weights to synthesise several discrete beams. They are currently being developed for the Apertif upgrade to the Westerbork Synthesis Radio Telescope, and for the Australian Square Kilometre Array Pathfinder radio telescope.

== Switched array feeds ==
A switchable array of feed antennas in the focal plane is referred to as a switchable FPA. With this configuration, it is possible to switch between a set of beams directed in different directions. This makes the system steerable in the switching sense, thus creating a multi-beam system. In a switched FPA, the distance between feeding elements are chosen following

$$\Delta d = F \lambda/D,$$

where F is the focal length of the optical system, D is the diameter of the optical system and λ is the wavelength.

== Monopulse feeds ==
The angle to the observed target (e.g. a meteor in meteor studies) can be estimated using amplitude monopulse. In such a configuration, three signals are collected from four feed elements. These signals are the elevation difference signal, the azimuth difference signal and the sum signal.

== See also ==
- Staring array
