= Mercury telluride =

Topologically insulating chemical compound

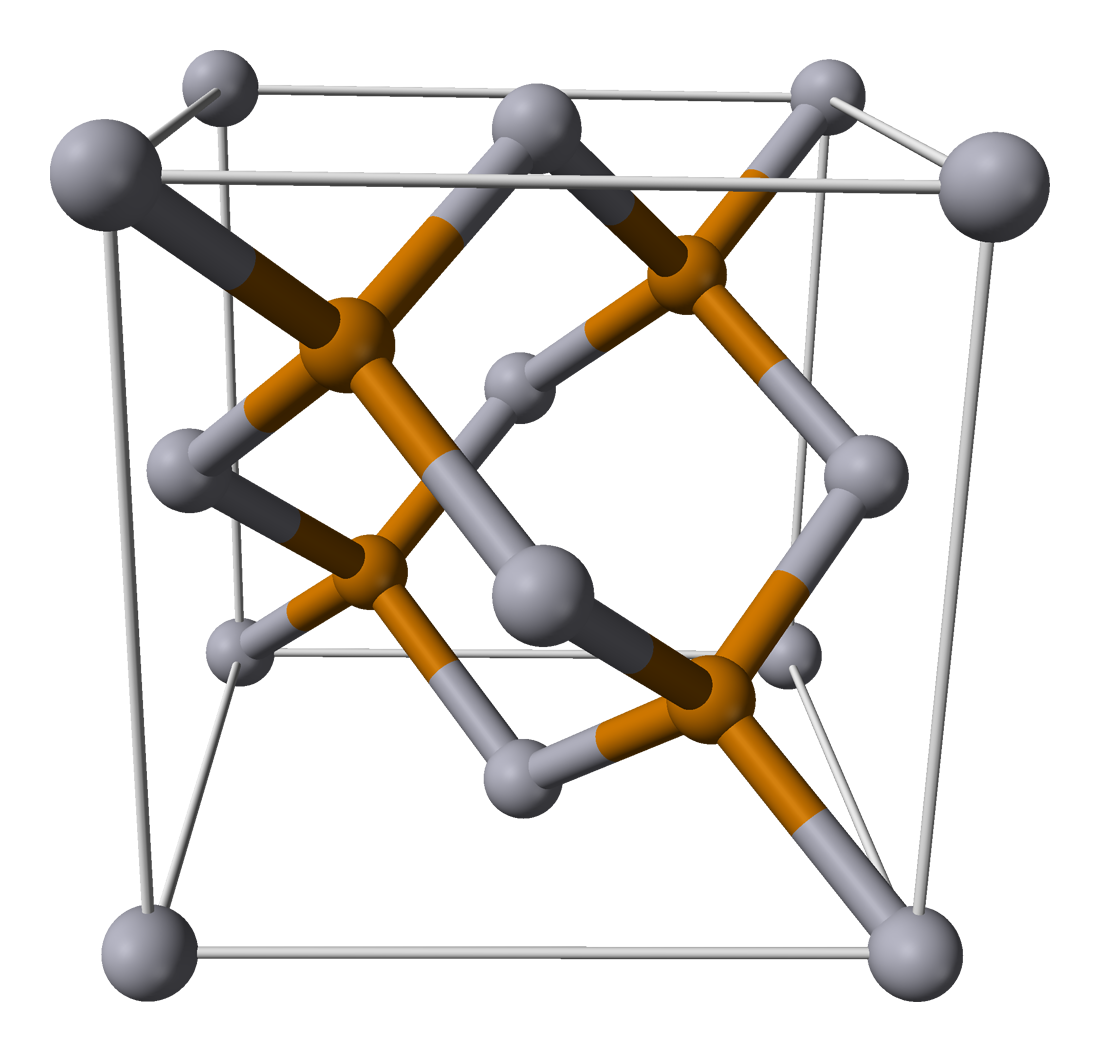

Names
- Systematic IUPAC name Mercury telluride
- Other names Mercuric telluride, mercury(II) telluride

Identifiers
CAS Number	12068-90-5
3D model (JSmol)	Interactive image
ChemSpider	74814
ECHA InfoCard	100.031.905
EC Number	235-108-9
PubChem CID	82914
CompTox Dashboard (EPA)	DTXSID3065245
- InChI: InChI=1S/Hg.Te Key: VCEXCCILEWFFBG-UHFFFAOYSA-N
- SMILES: [Te]=[Hg]

Properties
Chemical formula	HgTe
Molar mass	328.19 g/mol
Appearance	near black cubic crystals
Density	8.1 g/cm^{3}
Melting point	670°C

Structure
Crystal structure	Sphalerite, cF8
Space group	F4̅3m, No. 216
- Except where otherwise noted, data are given for materials in their standard state (at 25 °C [77 °F], 100 kPa). verify (what is ?) Infobox references

Mercury telluride (HgTe) is a binary chemical compound of mercury and tellurium. It is a semi-metal related to the II-VI group of semiconductor materials. Alternative names are mercuric telluride and mercury(II) telluride.

HgTe occurs in nature as the mineral form coloradoite.

== Physical properties ==
All properties are at standard temperature and pressure unless stated otherwise. The lattice parameter is about 0.646 nm in the cubic crystalline form. The bulk modulus is about 42.1 GPa. The thermal expansion coefficient is about 5.2×10^{−6}/K. The static and dynamic dielectric constants are 20.8 and 15.1, respectively. The thermal conductivity is low at 2.7 W·m^{2}/(m·K). HgTe bonds are weak leading to low hardness values. The hardness is 2.7×10^{7} kg/m^{2}.

=== Doping ===
N-type doping can be achieved with elements such as boron, aluminium, gallium, or indium. Iodine and iron will also dope n-type. HgTe is naturally p-type due to mercury vacancies. P-type doping is also achieved by introducing zinc, copper, silver, or gold.

=== Topological insulation ===
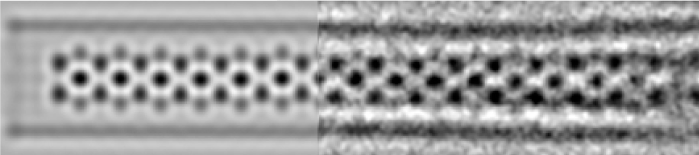
Electron micrograph (right) of a HgTe nanowire embedded in a carbon nanotube, combined with an image simulation (left).

Mercury telluride was the first topological insulator discovered, in 2007. Topological insulators cannot support an electric current in the bulk, but electronic states confined to the surface can serve as charge carriers.

== Chemistry ==
HgTe bonds are weak. Their enthalpy of formation, around −32kJ/mol, is less than a third of the value for the related compound cadmium telluride. HgTe is easily etched by acids, such as hydrobromic acid.

== Growth ==
Bulk growth is from a mercury and tellurium melt in the presence of a high mercury vapour pressure. HgTe can also be grown epitaxially, for example, by sputtering or by metalorganic vapour phase epitaxy.

Nanoparticles of mercury telluride can be obtained via cation exchange from cadmium telluride nanoplatelets.

== See also ==
- Cadmium telluride
- Mercury selenide
- Mercury cadmium telluride
