= ISPIM =

ISPIM (The International Society for Professional Innovation Management) originated in an initiative taken by Professor Knut Holt at the University of Trondheim in 1973. Wishing to initiate a modern approach to innovation management research, Professor Holt started a programme of studies on Needs Assessment and Information Behaviour: the NAIB Program.

The objective was to present tools and guidelines for practical application to product innovation processes, which was a new field of enquiry at the time. During this period an international group formally founded ISPIM and held the first international conference on product innovation management. In the years since then, ISPIM has organised scientific and managerial publications, conferences and symposia.

ISPIM has over 700 members, holds scientific gatherings and produces scientific publications in innovation management research.
