= Aluminium arsenide =

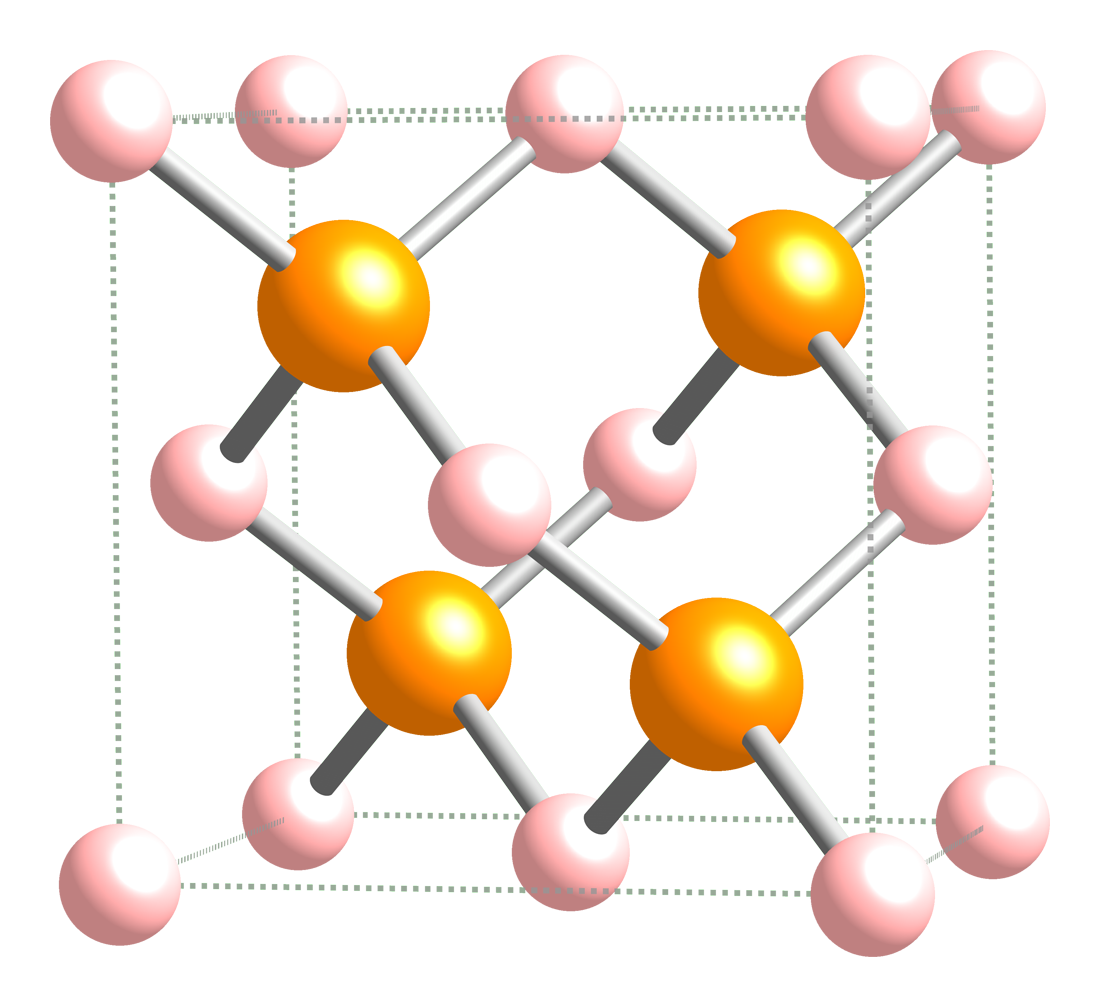

Identifiers
CAS Number	22831-42-1
3D model (JSmol)	Interactive image
ChemSpider	81112
ECHA InfoCard	100.041.126
EC Number	245-555-0
PubChem CID	89859
CompTox Dashboard (EPA)	DTXSID9066831
- InChI: InChI=1S/Al.As Key: MDPILPRLPQYEEN-UHFFFAOYSA-N; InChI=1/Al.As/rAlAs/c1-2 Key: MDPILPRLPQYEEN-LYSWLDLJAW
- SMILES: [AsH+]12[Al-][AsH+]3[Al-][AsH+]([AlH-]14)[AlH-]1[As+]5([AlH-]38)[Al-]26[AsH+]2[AlH-]([As+]4)[AsH+]1[Al-][AsH+]3[AlH-]2[As+][AlH-]([AsH+]6[AlH-]([AsH+])[AsH+]68)[AsH+]([Al-]6)[AlH-]35

Properties
Chemical formula	AlAs
Molar mass	101.9031 g/mol
Appearance	orange crystals
Density	3.72 g/cm^{3}
Melting point	1,740 °C (3,160 °F; 2,010 K)
Solubility in water	reacts
Solubility	reacts in ethanol
Band gap	2.17 eV (indirect)
Electron mobility	200 cm^{2}/(V·s) (300 K)
Thermal conductivity	0.9 W/(cm·K) (300 K)
Refractive index (n_{D})	3 (infrared)

Structure
Crystal structure	Zinc Blende
Space group	T^{2}_{d}-F-43m
Lattice constant	a = 566.0 pm
Coordination geometry	Tetrahedral

Thermochemistry
Std molar entropy (S^{⦵}_{298})	60.3 J/mol K
Std enthalpy of formation (Δ_{f}H^{⦵}_{298})	−116.3 kJ/mol

Hazards
- NIOSH (US health exposure limits)
PEL (Permissible)	[1910.1018] TWA 0.010 mg/m^{3}
REL (Recommended)	Ca C 0.002 mg/m^{3} [15-minute]
IDLH (Immediate danger)	Ca [5 mg/m^{3} (as As)]

Related compounds
Related semiconductor materials	Aluminium gallium arsenide, Aluminium indium arsenide, Aluminium antimonide, Boron arsenide
- Except where otherwise noted, data are given for materials in their standard state (at 25 °C [77 °F], 100 kPa). verify (what is ?) Infobox references

Aluminium arsenide (AlAs) is a semiconductor material with almost the same lattice constant as gallium arsenide and aluminium gallium arsenide and wider band gap than gallium arsenide. (AlAs) can form a superlattice with gallium arsenide (GaAs) which results in its semiconductor properties. Because GaAs and AlAs have almost the same lattice constant, the layers have very little induced strain, which allows them to be grown almost arbitrarily thick. This allows for extremely high performance high electron mobility, HEMT transistors, and other quantum well devices.

== Properties ==
It has the following properties:

- Thermal expansion coefficient 5 μm/(°C*m)
- Debye temperature 417 K
- Microhardness 5.0 GPa (50 g load)
- Number of atoms in 1 cm^{3}: (4.42-0.17x)·10^{22}
- Bulk modulus (7.55+0.26x)·10^{11} dyn cm^{−2}
- Hardness on the Mohs scale: ~ 5
- Insolubility in H_{2}O

== Uses ==
Aluminium arsenide is a III-V compound semiconductor material and is an advantageous material for the manufacture of optoelectronic devices, such as light emitting diodes.

Aluminium arsenide can be prepared using well-known methods, such as liquid and vapor-phase epitaxy techniques or melt-growth techniques. However, aluminium arsenide crystals prepared by these methods are generally unstable and generate arsine (AsH_{3}) when exposed to moist air.

== Synthesis ==
Little work has been reported on the preparation of aluminium arsenide, mainly because of the practical difficulties involved. Preparation from the melt is difficult because of the high melting point of the compound (about 1,700 °C) and of the extreme reactivity of aluminium at this temperature. A few workers have prepared small crystals from the melt, and polycrystalline ingots have also been produced. The best of this material has an impurity carrier density of the order of 10^{19}/cm^{3} and is p-type.

== Reactivity ==
Aluminium arsenide is a stable compound; however, acid, acid fumes and moisture should be avoided. Hazardous polymerization will not occur. Decomposition of aluminium arsenide produces hazardous arsine gas and arsenic fumes.

== Toxicity ==
The chemical, physical and toxicological properties of aluminium arsenide have not been thoroughly investigated and recorded.

Aluminium compounds have many commercial uses and are commonly found in industry. Many of these materials are active chemically and thus exhibit dangerous toxic and reactive properties.

== Effects of exposure ==
Aluminium compounds have many commercial uses and are commonly found in industry. Many of these materials are active chemically and thus exhibit dangerous toxic and reactive properties. The chemical, physical and toxicological properties of aluminium arsenide have not been thoroughly investigated and recorded; however, there are some known chronic and acute symptoms based on chemical delivery.

Inhalation of aluminium arsenide may cause acute irritation to the respiratory system. It may also cause chronic arsenic poisoning, ulceration of the nasal septum, liver damage and cancer/diseases of the blood, kidneys and nervous system. Aluminium arsenide is poisonous if ingested and may cause gastrointestinal and skin effects and acute arsenic poisoning. Chronic implications from ingestion include arsenic poisoning, gastrointestinal disturbances, liver damage, and cancer/disease of the blood, kidneys and nervous system. If applied to the skin, aluminium arsenide may cause acute irritation, but there are no chronic health effects recorded.

== Special precautions ==
Precautions to be taken in handling and storage: Store in a cool, dry place in tightly sealed containers. Ensure there is good ventilation. Open and handle container with care. AlAs reacts on contact with acids or moisture to give a host of volatile, highly toxic arsenic compounds such as Arsine.
