= Microbolometer =

Microscopic device for detecting infrared radiation

Simplified representation of a bolometric pixel

A microbolometer is a specific type of bolometer used as a detector in a thermal camera. Infrared radiation with wavelengths between 7.5–14 μm strikes the detector material, heating it, and thus changing its electrical resistance. This resistance change is measured and processed into temperatures which can be used to create an image. Unlike other types of infrared detecting equipment, microbolometers do not require cooling.

== Theory of construction ==
A microbolometer is an uncooled thermal sensor. High resolution thermal sensors require exotic and expensive cooling methods including stirling cycle coolers and liquid nitrogen coolers. These methods of cooling high resolution thermal imagers are expensive to operate and unwieldy to move. Also, high resolution thermal imagers require a cool down time in excess of 10 minutes before being usable.

Figure 1. Cross-sectional view of a microbolometer

A microbolometer consists of an array of pixels, each pixel being made up of several layers. The cross-sectional diagram shown in Figure 1 provides a generalized view of the pixel. Each company that manufactures microbolometers has their own unique procedure for producing them and they even use a variety of different IR absorbing materials. In this example the bottom layer consists of a silicon substrate and a readout integrated circuit (ROIC). Electrical contacts are deposited and then selectively etched away. A reflector, for example, a titanium mirror, is created beneath the IR absorbing material. Since some light is able to pass through the absorbing layer, the reflector redirects this light back up to ensure the greatest possible absorption, hence allowing a stronger signal to be produced. Next, a sacrificial layer is deposited so that later in the process a gap can be created to thermally isolate the IR absorbing material from the ROIC. A layer of absorbing material is then deposited and selectively etched so that the final contacts can be created. To create the final bridge like structure shown in Figure 1, the sacrificial layer is removed so that the absorbing material is suspended approximately 2 μm above the readout circuit. Because microbolometers do not undergo any cooling, the absorbing material must be thermally isolated from the bottom ROIC and the bridge like structure allows for this to occur. After the array of pixels is created the microbolometer is encapsulated under a vacuum to increase the longevity of the device. In some cases the entire fabrication process is done without breaking vacuum.

The microbolometer array is commonly found in two sizes, 320×240 pixels or less expensive 160×120 pixels. Current technology has led to the production of devices with 640×480 or 1024x768 pixels. There has also been a decrease in the individual pixel dimensions that was typically 45 μm in older devices, decreased to 12 μm in the 2000s, and most recently 6 μm in 2025-manufactured microbolometers. As pixel dimensions decrease and the number of pixels per unit area of the array increases proportionally, an image with higher resolution is created, but with a higher NETD (noise equivalent temperature difference (differential)) due to smaller pixels being less sensitive to IR radiation.

== Detecting material properties ==
There is a wide variety of materials that are used for the detector element in microbolometers. A main factor in dictating how well the device will work is the device's responsivity. Responsivity is the ability of the device to convert the incoming radiation into an electrical signal. Detector material properties influence this value and thus several main material properties should be investigated: TCR, 1/f noise, and resistance.

A microbolometer array imaging system(MAIS) has potential for medical applications to detect 1-5 Thz signals on the body’s surface created by a non-ionizing radiation generator as of 2025.

=== Temperature coefficient of resistance (TCR) ===
The material used in the detector must demonstrate large changes in resistance as a result of minute changes in temperature. As the material is heated, due to the incoming infrared radiation, the resistance of the material decreases. This is related to the material's temperature coefficient of resistance (TCR) specifically its negative temperature coefficient. Industry currently manufactures microbolometers that contain materials with TCRs near −2%/K. Although many materials exist that have far higher TCRs, there are several other factors that need to be taken into consideration when producing optimized microbolometers.

=== 1/f noise ===
1/f noise, like other noises, causes a disturbance that affects the signal and that may distort the information carried by the signal. Changes in temperature across the absorbing material are determined by changes in the bias current or voltage flowing through the detecting material. If the noise is large then small changes that occur may not be seen clearly and the device is useless. Using a detector material that has a minimum amount of 1/f noise allows for a clearer signal to be maintained between IR detection and the output that is displayed. Detector material must be tested to assure that this noise does not significantly interfere with signal.

=== Resistance ===
Using a material that has low room temperature resistance is important for two reasons. First, lower resistance across the detecting material means less power will need to be used. Second, higher resistances comes with higher Johnson–Nyquist noise.

== Detecting materials ==
The two most commonly used IR radiation detecting materials in microbolometers are amorphous silicon and vanadium oxide. A problem with some potential materials is that to create the desirable properties their deposition temperatures may be too high for CMOS fabrication processes. Much research has been done to test the feasibility of other materials to be used. Those investigated include: Ti, YBaCuO, GeSiO, poly SiGe, BiLaSrMnO and protein-based cytochrome C and bovine serum albumin.

Amorphous Si (a-Si) thin films can easily be integrated into the CMOS fabrication process using low deposition temperatures, is highly stable, has a fast time constant, and has a long mean time before failure. To create the layered structure and patterning using the CMOS fabrication process requires temperatures to stay below 200˚C on average. a-Si also possesses excellent values for TCR, 1/f noise and resistance when deposition parameters are optimized.

Vanadium oxide thin films may also be integrated into the CMOS fabrication process although not as easily as a-Si for temperature reasons. VO is an older technology than a-Si, and its performance and longevity are inferior. Deposition at high temperatures and performing post-annealing allows for the production of films with superior properties. VO_{2} has low resistance but undergoes a metal-insulator phase change near 67 °C and also has a lower value of TCR. On the other hand, V_{2}O_{5} exhibits high resistance and also high TCR. Many phases of VO_{x} exist although it seems that x≈1.8 has become the most popular for microbolometer applications. A thermal imaging camera with a vanadium oxide micro-bolometer detector is more stable, compact, and sensitive compared with any other technology though VOx is older technology.

The market share of VOx is much higher than any other technology. VOx market share is 70% where as amorphous silicon is 13%. Also, VOx technology based thermal cameras are being used in defence sector due to its sensitivity, image stability and reliability.

The use of infrared optical antennae together with small-size microbolometer materials can enhance its detection efficiency.

A graphene infused layer above a Vanadium oxide microbolometer can improve sensitivity detecting 1-5 Thz frequencies.

== Active vs passive microbolometers ==
Most microbolometers contain a temperature sensitive resistor which makes them a passive electronic device. In 1994 one company, Electro-Optic Sensor Design (EOSD), began looking into producing microbolometers that used a thin film transistor (TFT), which is a special kind of field effect transistor. The main change in these devices would be the addition of a gate electrode. Although the main concepts of the devices are similar, using this design allows for the advantages of the TFT to be utilized. Some benefits include tuning of the resistance and activation energy and the reduction of periodic noise patterns. As of 2004 this device was still being tested and was not used in commercial IR imaging.

== Advantages ==
- They are small and lightweight. For applications requiring relatively short ranges, the physical dimensions of the camera are even smaller. This property enables, for example, the mounting of uncooled microbolometer thermal imagers on helmets.
- Provide real video output immediately after power on.
- Low power consumption relative to cooled detector thermal imagers.
- Very long mean time between failures.
- Less expensive compared to cameras based on cooled detectors.

== Disadvantages ==
- Less sensitive (due to higher noise) than cooled thermal and photon detector imagers, and as a result have not been able to match the resolution of cooled semiconductor based approaches.

== Performance limits ==
The sensitivity is partly limited by the thermal conductance of the pixel. The speed of response is limited by the thermal heat capacity divided by the thermal conductance. Reducing the heat capacity increases the speed but also increases statistical mechanical thermal temperature fluctuations (noise). Increasing the thermal conductance raises the speed, but decreases sensitivity.

== Origins ==
Microbolometer technology was originally developed by Honeywell starting in the late 1970s as a classified contract for the US Department of Defense. The US Government declassified the technology in 1992. After declassification Honeywell licensed their technology to several manufacturers.

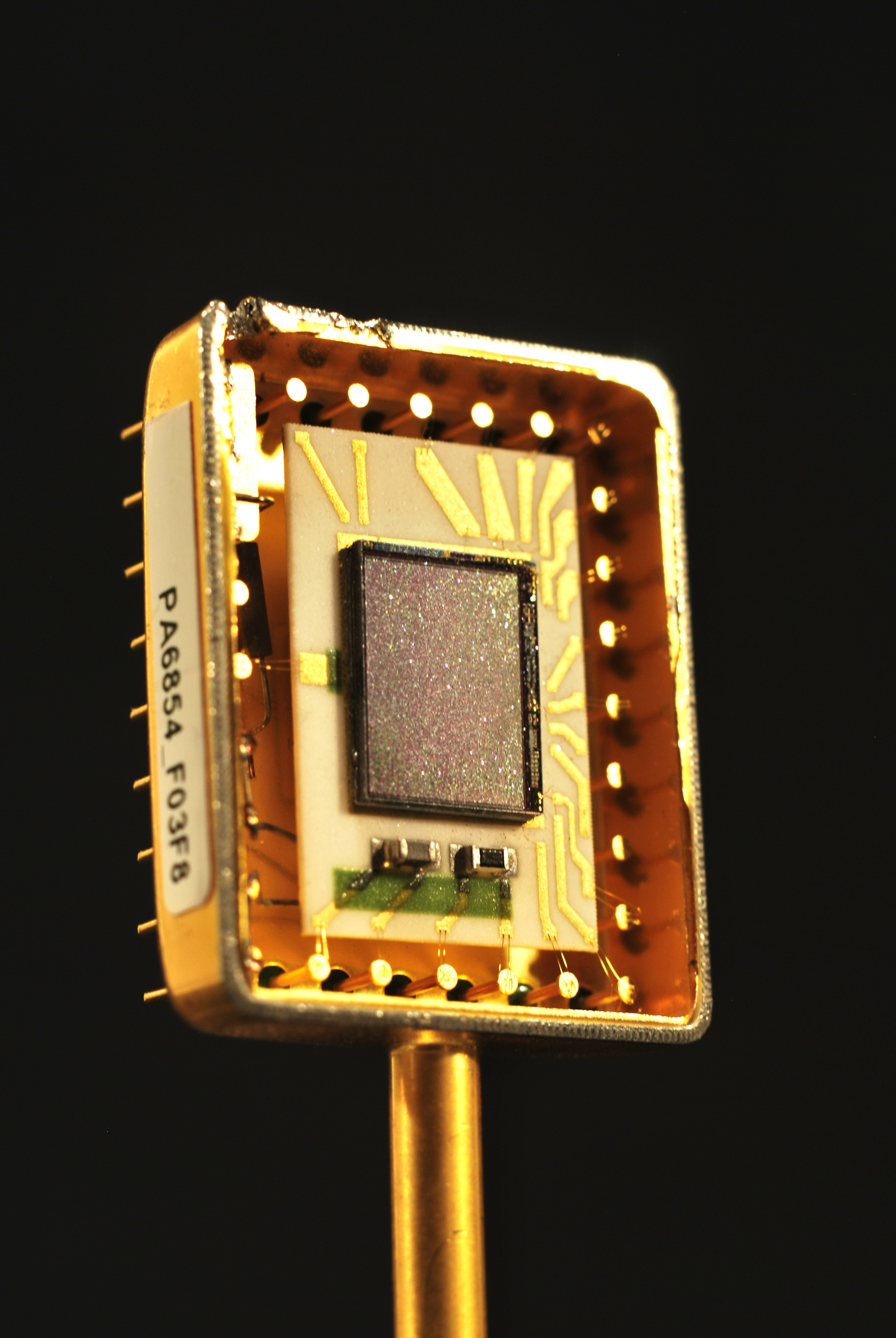
Microbolometer manufactured by Honeywell for Infrared Solutions Inc. (Fluke Thermography) in Minneapolis, MN

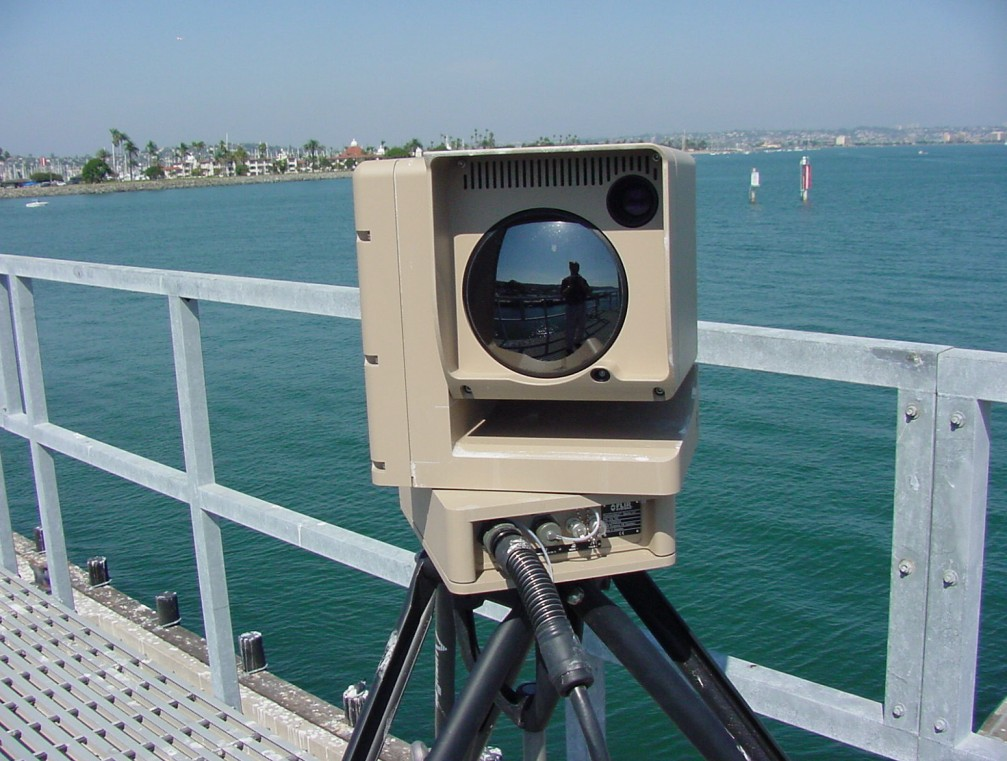
The FLIR Systems ThermoVision SENTRY infrared imaging system utilizes a 320×240 microbolometer array.

== Manufacturers of microbolometer arrays by volume ==
1. Teledyne FLIR Systems / Teledyne Dalsa
2. LYNRED SAS (ex Sofradir et ULIS)
3. Leonardo DRS, Inc.
4. BAE Systems plc
5. Guide Sensmart Tech Company, Ltd.

=== Remaining manufacturers ===
- Xenics
- DRS Technologies
- Fraunhofer IMS
- GUIDEIR
- Honeywell (Manufactured for Infrared Solutions)
- Institut National d'Optique (INO)
- L-3 Communications Infrared Products
- InfraredVision Technology Corporation (affiliated with L-3)
- Mikrosens Electronics Inc.
- NEC
- Opgal Optronics
- Obsidian Sensors
- Qioptiq
- Raytheon
- Raytron
- SemiConductor Devices

== Microbolometer array systems integrators ==
- Seek Thermal
