= Indium antimonide =

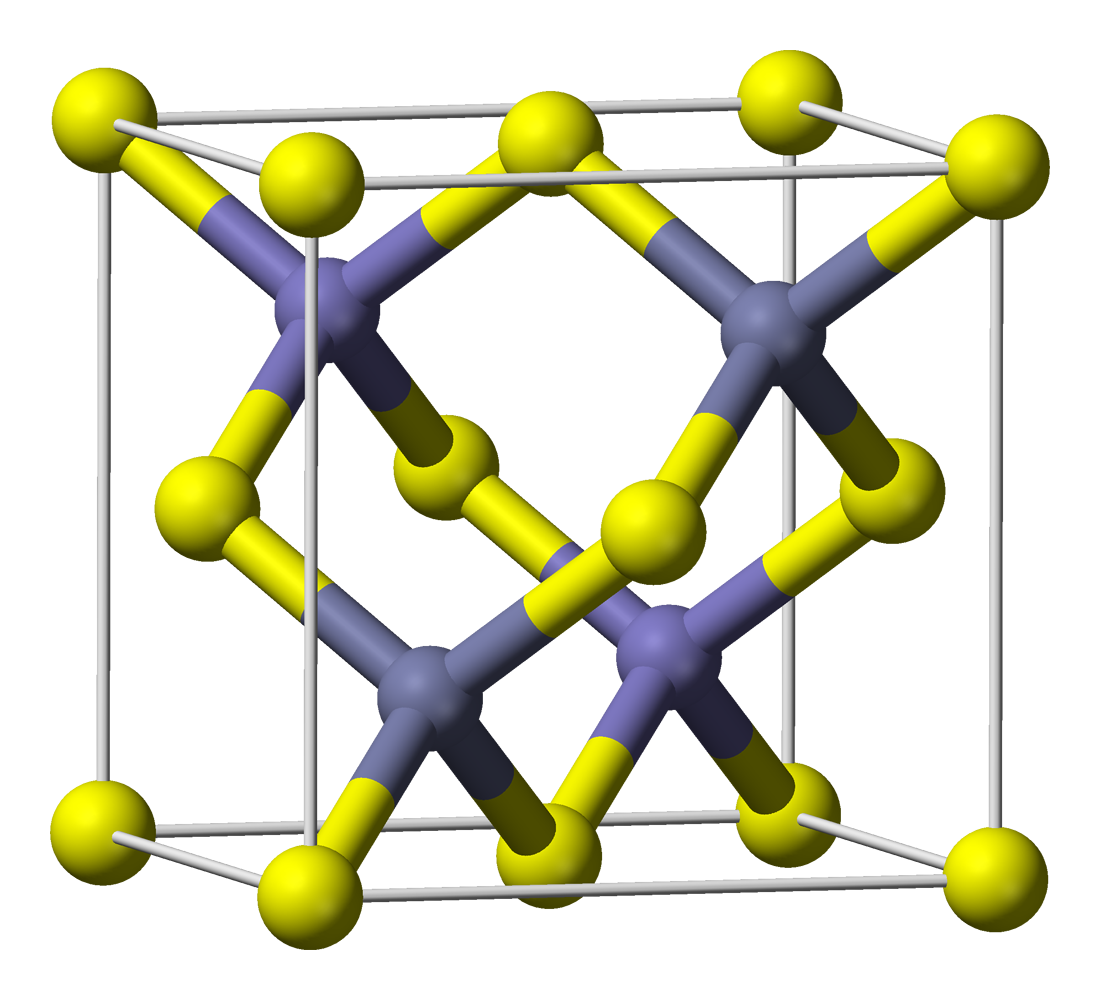
- Ball and stick cell model of indium antimonide

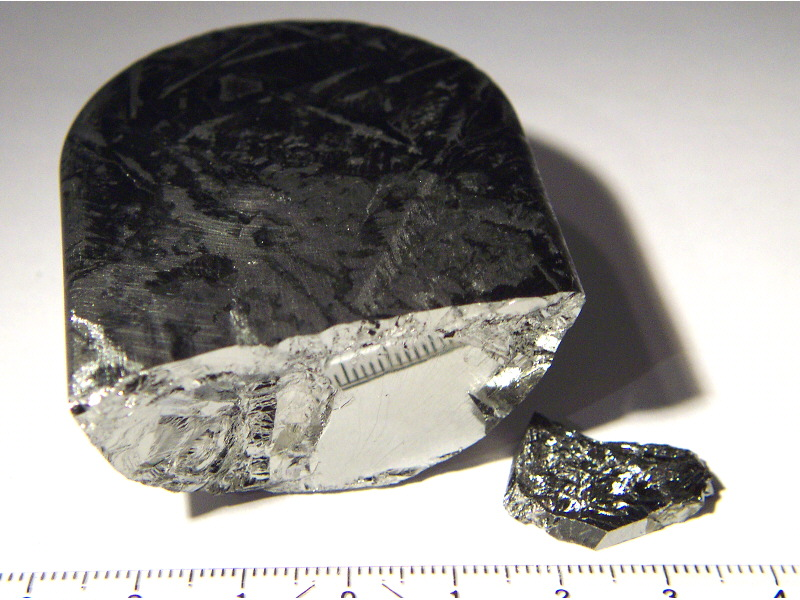
- Sample of crystalline indium antimonide

Identifiers
CAS Number	1312-41-0
3D model (JSmol)	Interactive image
ChemSpider	2709929
ECHA InfoCard	100.013.812
EC Number	215-192-3
PubChem CID	3468413
RTECS number	NL1105000
UNII	CVZ50C0S9O
UN number	1549
CompTox Dashboard (EPA)	DTXSID40883672
- InChI: InChI=1S/In.Sb Key: WPYVAWXEWQSOGY-UHFFFAOYSA-N
- SMILES: [In]#[Sb]

Properties
Chemical formula	InSb
Molar mass	236.578 g·mol^{−1}
Appearance	Dark grey, metallic crystals
Density	5.7747 g⋅cm^{−3}
Melting point	524 °C (975 °F; 797 K)
Band gap	0.17 eV
Electron mobility	7.7 mC⋅s⋅g^{−1} (at 27 °C)
Thermal conductivity	180 mW⋅K^{−1}⋅cm^{−1} (at 27 °C)
Refractive index (n_{D})	4

Structure
Crystal structure	Zincblende
Space group	T^{2}_{d}-F-43m
Lattice constant	a = 0.648 nm
Coordination geometry	Tetrahedral

Thermochemistry
Heat capacity (C)	49.5 J·K^{−1}·mol^{−1}
Std molar entropy (S^{⦵}_{298})	86.2 J·K^{−1}·mol^{−1}
Std enthalpy of formation (Δ_{f}H^{⦵}_{298})	−30.5 kJ·mol^{−1}
Gibbs free energy (Δ_{f}G^{⦵})	−25.5 kJ·mol^{−1}

Hazards
- GHS labelling
Pictograms	(GHS07: Exclamation mark) (GHS09: Environmental hazard)
Signal word	Warning
Hazard statements	H302, H332, H411
Precautionary statements	P273

Related compounds
Other anions	Indium nitride Indium phosphide Indium arsenide
- Except where otherwise noted, data are given for materials in their standard state (at 25 °C [77 °F], 100 kPa). verify (what is ?) Infobox references

Indium antimonide (InSb) is a crystalline compound made from the elements indium (In) and antimony (Sb). It is a narrow-gap semiconductor material from the III-V group used in infrared detectors, including thermal imaging cameras, FLIR systems, infrared homing missile guidance systems, and in infrared astronomy. Indium antimonide detectors are sensitive to infrared wavelengths between 1 and 5 μm.

Indium antimonide was a very common detector in the old, single-detector mechanically scanned thermal imaging systems. Another application is as a terahertz radiation source as it is a strong photo-Dember emitter.

== History ==
The intermetallic compound was first reported by Liu and Peretti in 1951, who gave its homogeneity range, structure type, and lattice constant. Polycrystalline ingots of InSb were prepared by Heinrich Welker in 1952, although they were not very pure by today's semiconductor standards. Welker was interested in systematically studying the semiconducting properties of the III-V compounds. He noted how InSb appeared to have a small direct band gap and a very high electron mobility. InSb crystals have been grown by slow cooling from liquid melt at least since 1954.

In 2018, a research team at Delft University of Technology claimed that indium antimonide nanowires showed potential application in creating Majorana zero mode quasiparticles for use in quantum computing; Microsoft opened a laboratory at the university to further this research, however Delft later retracted the paper.

== Physical properties ==
InSb has the appearance of dark-grey silvery metal pieces or powder with vitreous lustre. When subjected to temperatures over 500 °C, it melts and decomposes, liberating antimony and antimony oxide vapors.

The crystal structure is zincblende with a 0.648 nm lattice constant.

=== Electronic properties ===
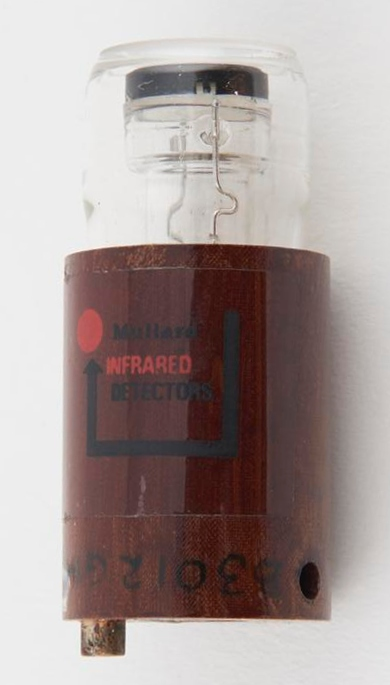
InSb infrared detector manufactured by Mullard in the 1960s.

InSb is a narrow direct band gap semiconductor with an energy band gap of 0.17 eV at 300 K and 0.23 eV at 80 K.

Undoped InSb possesses the largest ambient-temperature electron mobility of 78000 cm^{2}/(V⋅s), electron drift velocity, and ballistic length (up to 0.7 μm at 300 K) of any known semiconductor, except for carbon nanotubes.

Indium antimonide photodiode detectors are photovoltaic, generating electric current when subjected to infrared radiation. InSb's internal quantum efficiency is effectively 100% but is a function of the thickness particularly for near bandedge photons. Like all narrow bandgap materials InSb detectors require periodic recalibrations, increasing the complexity of the imaging system. This added complexity is worthwhile where extreme sensitivity is required, e.g. in long-range military thermal imaging systems. InSb detectors also require cooling, as they have to operate at cryogenic temperatures (typically 80 K). Large arrays (up to 2048×2048 pixels) are available. HgCdTe and PtSi are materials with similar use.

A layer of indium antimonide sandwiched between layers of aluminium indium antimonide can act as a quantum well. In such a heterostructure InSb/AlInSb has recently been shown to exhibit a robust quantum Hall effect. This approach is studied in order to construct very fast transistors. Bipolar transistors operating at frequencies up to 85 GHz were constructed from indium antimonide in the late 1990s; field-effect transistors operating at over 200 GHz have been reported more recently (Intel/QinetiQ). Some models suggest that terahertz frequencies are achievable with this material. Indium antimonide semiconductor devices are also capable of operating with voltages under 0.5 V, reducing their power requirements.

== Growth methods ==
InSb can be grown by solidifying a melt from the liquid state (Czochralski process), or epitaxially by liquid phase epitaxy, hot wall epitaxy or molecular beam epitaxy. It can also be grown from organometallic compounds by MOVPE.

== Device applications ==
- Thermal image detectors using photodiodes or photoelectromagnetic detectors
- Magnetic field sensors using magnetoresistance or the Hall effect
- Fast transistors (in terms of dynamic switching). This is due to the high carrier mobility of InSb
- In some of the detectors of the Infrared Array Camera on the Spitzer Space Telescope

== Cited sources ==
- Haynes, William M., ed. (2016). CRC Handbook of Chemistry and Physics (97th ed.). CRC Press. ISBN 978-1-4987-5429-3.
