= Readout integrated circuit =

Integrated circuit used for reading detectors of a particular type

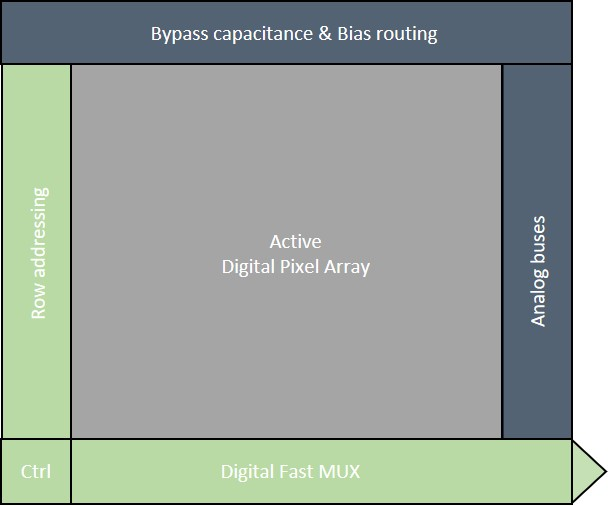
Digital pixel readout integrated circuit (DPROIC) block diagram

A readout integrated circuit (ROIC) is an integrated circuit (IC) specifically used for reading detectors of a particular type. They are compatible with different types of detectors such as infrared and ultraviolet. The primary purpose for ROICs is to accumulate the photocurrent from each pixel and then transfer the resultant signal onto output taps for readout. Conventional ROIC technology stores the signal charge at each pixel and then routes the signal onto output taps for readout. This requires storing large signal charge at each pixel site and maintaining signal-to-noise ratio (or dynamic range) as the signal is read out and digitized.

A ROIC has high-speed analog outputs to transmit pixel data outside of the integrated circuit. If digital outputs are implemented, the IC is referred to as a Digital Readout Integrated Circuit (DROIC).

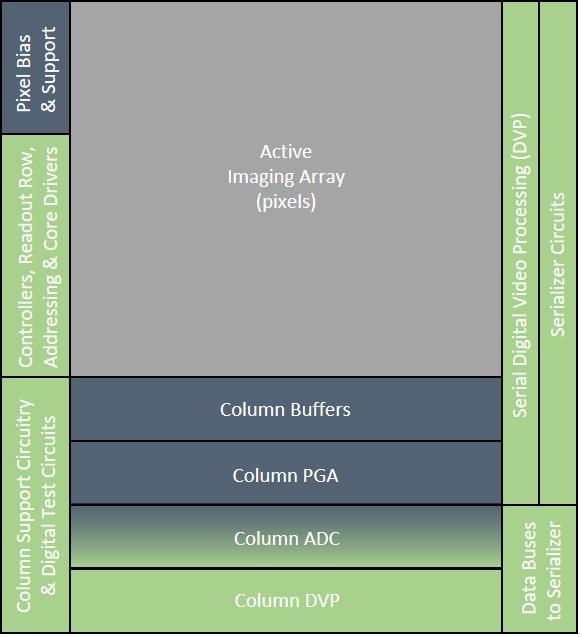
Digital readout integrated circuit (DROIC) block diagram

A digital readout integrated circuit (DROIC) is a class of ROIC that uses on-chip analog-to-digital conversion (ADC) to digitize the accumulated photocurrent in each pixel of the imaging array. DROICs are easier to integrate into a system compared to ROICs as the package size and complexity are reduced, they are less sensitive to noise and have higher bandwidth compared to analog outputs.

A digital pixel readout integrated circuit (DPROIC) is a ROIC that uses on-chip analog-to-digital conversion (ADC) within each pixel (or small group of pixels) to digitize the accumulated photocurrent within the imaging array. DPROICs have an even higher bandwidth than DROICs and can significantly increase the well capacity and dynamic range of the device.

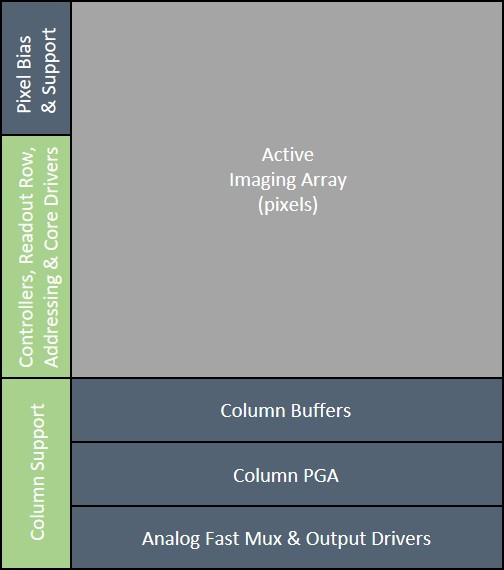
Readout integrated circuit (ROIC) block diagram
