= Indium halides =

Class of chemical compounds

There are three sets of Indium halides, the trihalides, the monohalides, and several intermediate halides. In the monohalides the oxidation state of indium is +1 and their proper names are indium(I) fluoride, indium(I) chloride, indium(I) bromide and indium(I) iodide.

The intermediate halides contain indium with oxidation states, +1, +2 and +3.

== Indium trihalides ==
In all of the trihalides the oxidation state of indium is +3, and their proper names are indium(III) fluoride, indium(III) chloride, indium(III) bromide, and indium(III) iodide. The trihalides are Lewis acidic. Indium trichloride is a starting point in the production of trimethylindium which is used in the semiconductor industry.

=== Indium(III) fluoride ===
InF_{3} is a white solid, m.p. 1170 °C. Its structure contains 6 coordinate indium.

=== Indium(III) chloride ===
InCl_{3} is a white solid, m.p. 586 °C. It is obtained by oxidation of indium with chlorine. It is isostructural with AlCl_{3}.

=== Indium(III) bromide ===
InBr_{3} is a pale yellow solid, m.p. 435 °C. It is isostructural with AlCl_{3}. It is prepared by combining the elements. InBr_{3} finds some use in organic synthesis as a water tolerant Lewis acid.

=== Indium(III) iodide ===
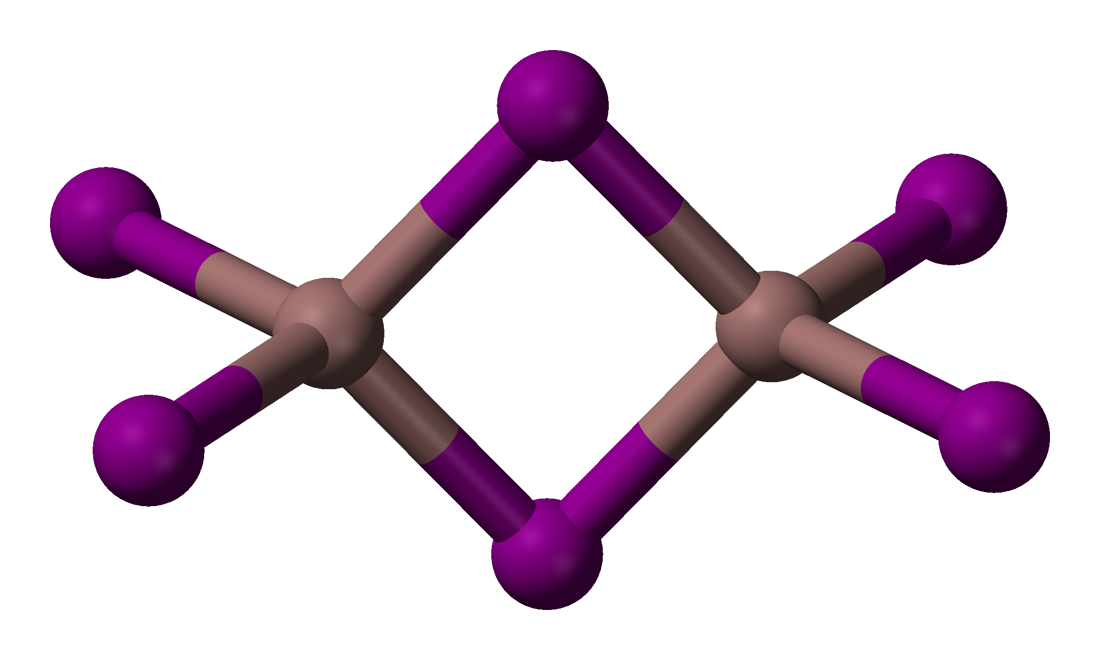
Ball-and-stick model of the In_{2}I_{6} molecule

InI_{3} is a yellow solid. It is obtained by evaporation of a solution of indium in HI. Distinct yellow and a red forms are known. The red form undergoes a transition to the yellow at 57 °C. The structure of the red form has not been determined by X-ray crystallography, however spectroscopic evidence indicates that indium may be six coordinate. The yellow form consists of In_{2}I_{6} with 4 coordinate indium centres. It is used as an "iodide getter" in the Cativa process.

== Intermediate halides ==
A surprising number of intermediate chlorides and bromides are known, but only one iodide, and no difluoride. Rather than the apparent oxidation state of +2, these compounds contain indium in the +1 and +3 oxidation states. Thus the diiodide is described as In^{I}In^{III}X_{4}. It was some time later that the existence of compounds containing the anion In_{2}Br^{2−}_{6} were confirmed which contains an indium-indium bond. Early work on the chlorides and bromides involved investigations of the binary phase diagrams of the trihalides and the related monohalide. Many of the compounds were initially misidentified as many of them are incongruent and decompose before melting. The majority of the previously reported chlorides and bromides have now either had their existence and structures confirmed by X Ray diffraction studies or have been consigned to history. Perhaps the most unexpected case of mistaken identity was the surprising result that a careful reinvestigation of the InCl/InCl_{3} binary phase diagram did not find InCl_{2}.
The reason for this abundance of compounds is that indium forms 4 and 6 coordinate anions containing indium(III) e.g. InBr^{−}_{4}, InCl^{3−}_{6} as well as the anion In_{2}Br^{2−}_{6} that surprisingly contains an indium-indium bond.

=== In_{7}Cl_{9} and In_{7}Br_{9} ===
In_{7}Cl_{9} is yellow solid stable up to 250 °C that is formulated In^{I}_{6}(In^{III}Cl_{6})Cl_{3}

In_{7}Br_{9} has a similar structure to In_{7}Cl_{9} and can be formulated as In^{I}_{6}(In^{III}Br_{6})Br_{3}

=== In_{5}Br_{7} ===
In_{5}Br_{7} is a pale yellow solid. It is formulated In^{I}_{3}(In^{II}_{2}Br_{6})Br. The In^{II}_{2}Br_{6} anion has an eclipsed ethane like structure with a metal-metal bond length of 270 pm.

=== In_{2}Cl_{3} and In_{2}Br_{3} ===
In_{2}Cl_{3} is colourless and is formulated In^{I}_{3} In^{III}Cl_{6} In contrast In_{2}Br_{3} contains the In_{2}Br_{6} anion as present in In_{5}Br_{7}, and is formulated In^{I}_{2}(In^{II}_{2}Br_{6}) with a structure similar to Ga_{2}Br_{3}.

=== In_{4}Br_{7} ===
In_{4}Br_{7} is near colourless with a pale greenish yellow tint. It is light sensitive (like TlCl and TlBr) decaying to InBr_{2} and In metal. It is a mixed salt containing the InBr^{−}_{4} and InBr^{3−}_{6} anions balanced by In^{+} cations. It is formulated In^{I}_{5}(In^{III}Br_{4})_{2}(In^{III}Br_{6}) The reasons for the distorted lattice have been ascribed to an antibonding combination between doubly filled, non-directional indium 5s orbitals and neighboring bromine 4p hybrid orbitals.

=== In_{5}Cl_{9} ===
In_{5}Cl_{9} is formulated as In^{I}_{3}In^{III}_{2}Cl_{9}. The In_{2}Cl^{3−}_{9} anion has two 6 coordinate indium atoms with 3 bridging chlorine atoms, face sharing bioctahedra, with a similar structure to Cr_{2}Cl^{2−}_{9} and Tl_{2}Cl^{2−}_{9}.

=== InBr_{2} ===
InBr_{2} is a greenish white crystalline solid, which is formulated In^{I}In^{III} Br_{4}. It has the same structure as GaCl_{2}. InBr_{2} is soluble in aromatic solvents and some compounds containing η^{6}-arene In(I) complexes have been identified. (See hapticity for an explanation of the bonding in such arene-metal ion complexes). With some ligands InBr_{2} forms neutral complexes containing an indium-indium bond.

=== InI_{2} ===
InI_{2} is a yellow solid that is formulated In^{I}In^{III}I_{4}.

== Monohalides ==
The solid monohalides InCl, InBr and InI are all unstable with respect to water, decomposing to the metal and indium(III) species. They fall between gallium(I) compounds, which are more reactive and thallium(I) that are stable with respect to water. InI is the most stable. Up until relatively recently the monohalides have been scientific curiosities, however with the discovery that they can be used to prepare indium cluster and chain compounds they are now attracting much more interest.

=== InF ===
InF only known as an unstable gaseous compound.

=== InCl ===
The room temperature form of InCl is yellow, with a cubic distorted NaCl structure. The red high temperature (>390 K) form has the $\ce{\beta-TlI}$ structure.

=== InBr ===
InBr is a red crystalline solid, mp 285 °C. It has the same structure as $\ce{\beta-TlI}$, with an orthorhombic distorted rock salt structure. It can be prepared from indium metal and InBr_{3}.

=== InI ===
InI is a deep red purple crystalline solid. It has the same structure as $\ce{\beta-TlI}$. It can be made by direct combination of its constituent elements at high temperature. Alternatively it can be prepared from InI_{3} and indium metal in refluxing xylenes. It is the most stable of the solid monohalides and is soluble in some organic solvents. Solutions of InI in a pyridine/m-xylene mixture are stable below 243 K.

== Anionic halide complexes of In(III) ==
The trihalides are Lewis Acids and form addition compounds with ligands. For InF_{3} there are few examples known however for the other halides addition compounds with tetrahedral, trigonal bipyramidal and octahedral coordination geometries are known. With halide ions there are examples of all of these geometries along with some anions with octahedrally coordinated indium and with bridging halogen atoms, In_{2}X^{3−}_{9} with three bridging halogen atoms and In_{2}X^{−}_{7} with just one. Additionally there are examples of indium with square planar geometry in the InX_{5}^{2−} ion. The square planar geometry of InCl^{2−}_{5} was the first found for a main group element.

=== InX^{−}_{4} and InX^{3−}_{6} ===
Salts of InCl^{−}_{4}, InBr^{−}_{4} and InI^{−}_{4} are known. The salt LiInF_{4} has been prepared, however it has an unusual layer structure with octahedrally coordinated indium center. Salts of InF_{6}^{3−}, InCl^{3−}_{6} and InBr^{3−}_{6} have all been made.

=== InCl^{2−}_{5} and InBr^{2−}_{5} ===
The InCl^{2−}_{5} ion has been found to be square pyramidal in the salt (NEt4)_{2}InCl_{5}, with the same structure as (NEt_{4})_{2} TlCl_{5}, but is trigonal bipyramidal in tetraphenylphosphonium pentachloroindate acetonitrile solvate.

The InBr^{2−}_{5} ion has similarly been found square pyramidal, albeit distorted, in the Bis(4-chloropyridinium) salt and trigonal bipyramidal in Bi_{37}InBr_{48}.

=== In_{2}X^{−}_{7} ===
The In_{2}X^{−}_{7} ions contain a single bridging halogen atom. Whether the bridge is bent or linear cannot be determined from the spectra. The chloride and bromide have been detected using electrospray mass spectrometry. The In_{2}I^{−}_{7} ion has been prepared in the salt CsIn_{2}I_{7}.

=== In_{2}X^{3−}_{9} ===
The caesium salts of In_{2}Cl^{3−}_{9} and In_{2}Br^{3−}_{9} both contain binuclear anions with octahedrally coordinated Indium atoms.

== Anionic halide complexes of In(I) and In(II) ==
=== In^{I}X^{−}_{2} and In^{I}X^{2−}_{3} ===
In^{I}X_{2}^{−} is produced when (inter alia) the In_{2}X_{6}^{2−} ion disproportionates. Salts containing the In^{I}X^{2−}_{3} ions have been made and their vibrational spectra interpreted as showing that they have C_{3v} symmetry, trigonal pyramidal geometry, with structures similar to the isoelectronic SnX^{−}_{3} ions.

=== In_{2}Cl^{2−}_{6}, In_{2}Br^{2−}_{6} and In_{2}I^{2−}_{6} ===
Salts of the chloride, bromide and iodide ions (Bu_{4}N)_{2}In_{2}X_{6} have been prepared. In non-aqueous solvents this ion disproportionates to give In^{I}X^{−}_{2} and In^{III}X^{−}_{4}.

== Neutral Indium(II) halide adducts ==
Following the discovery of the In_{2}Br_{6}^{2−} a number of related neutral compounds containing the In^{II}_{2}X_{4} kernel have been formed from the reaction of indium dihalides with neutral ligands. Some chemists refer to these adducts, when used as the starting point for the synthesis of cluster compounds as ‘In_{2}X_{4}’ e.g. the TMEDA adduct.

== General sources ==
- WebElements Periodic Table » Indium » compounds information
- Greenwood, Norman N.; Earnshaw, Alan (1997). Chemistry of the Elements (2nd ed.). Butterworth-Heinemann. doi:10.1016/C2009-0-30414-6. ISBN 978-0-08-037941-8.
- Cotton, F. Albert; Wilkinson, Geoffrey; Murillo, Carlos A.; Bochmann, Manfred (1999), Advanced Inorganic Chemistry (6th ed.), New York: Wiley-Interscience, ISBN 0-471-19957-5
