= Ammonium hexafluoroindate =

Names
- Other names Ammonium hexafluoroindate(III)

Identifiers
3D model (JSmol)	Interactive image
- InChI: InChI=1S/6FH.In.3H3N/h6*1H;;3*1H3/q;;;;;;+3;;;/p-3 Key: FSYGVNPMCCSLOH-UHFFFAOYSA-K
- SMILES: [NH4+].[NH4+].[NH4+].F[In-3](F)(F)(F)(F)F

Properties
Chemical formula	F_{6}H_{12}InN_{3}
Molar mass	282.925 g·mol^{−1}
Appearance	colorless crystals
Density	g/cm^{3}
Solubility in water	insoluble
- Except where otherwise noted, data are given for materials in their standard state (at 25 °C [77 °F], 100 kPa). Infobox references

Ammonium hexafluoroindate is an inorganic chemical compound with the chemical formula (NH_{4})_{3}InF_{6}.

== Synthesis ==
The compound can be obtained by reacting ammonium fluoride and indium bromide in anhydrous methanol, or by reacting ammonium fluoride and indium fluoride in aqueous solution.

Also, a reaction involving indium hydroxide and ammonium fluoride:

In(OH)_{3} + 3 HF + 3 NH_{4}F → (NH_{4})_{3}InF_{6} + 3 H_{2}O

== Physical properties ==
The compound decomposes at 120–170 °C to obtain NH_{4}InF_{4}, and further decomposes to InF_{3} at 185–300 °C.

Ammonium hexafluoroindiate forms colorless crystals of tetragonal system, space group P4mnc, insoluble in water.

At 80 °C, a phase transition into the cubic phase occurs.
