= Indium(I,III) iodide =

Names
- Other names Indium diiodide

Identifiers
CAS Number	13779-78-7
3D model (JSmol)	Interactive image
- SMILES: [In+].I[In-](I)(I)I

Properties
Chemical formula	InI_{2}
Molar mass	368.63 g/mol
Appearance	Red-brown crystalline solid
Density	4.71 g/cm^{3}
Melting point	224 °C (435 °F; 497 K)

Structure
Crystal structure	Orthorhombic
Space group	Pnna, No. 52
Lattice constant	a = 0.8525 nm, b = 1.0969 nm, c = 1.1162 nm
Formula units (Z)	4
- Except where otherwise noted, data are given for materials in their standard state (at 25 °C [77 °F], 100 kPa). Infobox references

Indium(I,III) iodide, also known as indium diiodide, is an inorganic compound of indium and iodine with the empirical formula InI_{2}. Despite this formula, it does not contain indium in the +2 oxidation state. In the solid state it is a mixed valence compound consisting of In^{+} cations and tetraiodoindate(III) anions, and is therefore more accurately formulated as In^{+}[InI_{4}]^{−}.

== Preparation ==
Indium(I,III) iodide can be prepared by reaction of elemental indium with mercury(II) iodide:

In + HgI_{2} → InI_{2} + Hg

It can also be prepared by comproportionation of elemental indium with indium(III) iodide.

A further preparative route uses excess indium metal and elemental iodine in refluxing toluene, from which In[InI_{4}] can be isolated.

== Properties ==
Indium(I,III) iodide is a red-brown, crystalline, diamagnetic and hygroscopic solid. Its melt is black.

In water, it disproportionates to elemental indium and indium(III) iodide.

The compound crystallizes in the orthorhombic crystal system in space group Pnna (No. 52). Single-crystal X-ray diffraction gives lattice parameters a = 8.525(5) Å, b = 10.969(9) Å and c = 11.162(8) Å, with four formula units per unit cell.

Its structure consists of discrete tetrahedral [InI_{4}]^{−} anions and In^{+} cations. The average In(III)–I bond length in the tetraiodoindate anion is about 2.714 Å. The monovalent indium ions are much more weakly coordinated by iodide than the In(III) centres, consistent with the presence of the 5s^{2} lone pair on In(I).

The compound is therefore better regarded as indium(I) tetraiodoindate(III), In[InI_{4}], rather than as a genuine indium(II) iodide.
