= Cryogenic seal =

Cryogenic seals provide a mechanical containment mechanism for materials held at cryogenic temperatures, such as cryogenic fluids. Various techniques, including soldering and welding are available for creating seals; however, specialized materials and processes are necessary to hermetically entrap cryogenic constituents under vacuum-tight conditions. Most commonly used are liquid helium and liquid nitrogen, which boil at very low temperatures, below −153 °C (120 K), as well as hydrocarbons with low freezing points and refrigerating mixtures. Pure indium wire or solder preform washers are accepted as the most reliable low temperature sealing materials. When correctly formed, indium will afford leak rates of less than 4.0x10 -9 mbar- liter/sec. Alternative cryogenic seal materials include silicone grease conical seals, and Pb/Sn (lead-tin) wire seals.

== History ==
Fundamental cryogenic processing began in the 1940s, albeit primitive. Steel cutting tools were immersed in liquid nitrogen to enhance their service life.

Mechanical processes utilizing cryogenics were documented well in the 1950s and by the 1980s cryogenic fluids began to be considered for storage and use in modern devices.

Today, cryogenic seals are a necessity in high-tech commercial, medical, and military applications to encapsulate the cryogenic fluids critical for device resolution and function.

== Applications ==
Applications which utilize cryogenic seals include:

- Magnetic resonance imaging (MRI)
- Chromatography
- Dilution Refrigeration Units
- Cooled Detectors
- Optical Windows
- Infrared Detectors
- Centrifugal Cryogenic Pumps
- Unmanned Aerial Vehicle Systems
- Missile Warning Receivers
- Satellite Tracking Systems
- Infrared Telescopes

== Indium seals ==
=== Advantages ===
Advantages of indium cryogenic seals:

- Established/proven design techniques for indium seal assembly
- Option for disassembly and re-assembly
- Indium can be reformed into useful seals after use
- Soft and pliable at room temperature, due to the low melting temperature of indium, so it fills imperfections. This creates an impervious bond between the mating surfaces, crafting a hermetic seal which remains malleable at cryogenic temperatures
- Seal integrity remains following thermal shock from room temperature to immersion in cryogenic bath
- Seal quality is independent of the mating surface composition, for instance ceramic, germanium, metal, or glass.
- Indium forms a self-passivating oxide layer, 80-100Ǻ thick. This layer is easy to remove with an acid etch, and the underlying, exposed indium metal can be compressed to form a tight, hermetic bond.

=== Disadvantages ===
In spite of their advantage, indium cryogenic seals have a few disadvantages: bulky mechanical structures are required to compress indium between the flanges, and pulsating loads cause creep of indium seals which loosens the bolt tension and thereby reducing the quality of the seal.

=== Process information for indium seals ===
Clean, oxide-free indium will cold weld to itself. The mating ends of a wire seal will weld together under compression. A more reliable alternative to a seal made from indium wire is a seal that uses an indium washer. Washers minimize the risk of seal degradation and cryogenic leaks by eliminating the interface between connected butt ends of wire. Washers are manufactured as a continuous ring with no breaks. Indium material used must be ultra-pure (99.9 minimum purity) to prevent hardening of the material at sub-zero temperatures, as well as to restrict impurities of elements with low vapor-pressure. Using vacuum-cast materials for indium cryogenic seals can prevent outgassing.

== Reliability testing ==
- Helium leak tests
- Cryogenic temperature shock testing

== Types ==
- Compact indium seal
- Compressible hermetic seal
- Compression seal
- Cryogenic vacuum seal
- Demountable cryogenic seal
- Indium cryogenic vacuum seal
- Indium o-ring flange seals
- Indium seal
- Indium wire o-ring
- Indium wire seal
- Low profile indium seal
- Low temperature seal
- Reusable cryogenic vacuum seal
- Reusable indium wire seal
- Reusable, low-profile, cryogenic wire seal
- Soft metal seal
- Vacuum compatible seal
- Vacuum compatible seal at cryogenic temperature
- Corner joint seal
- Face joint seal
