= Indium bromide =

Indium bromide may refer to:

- Indium(I) bromide, InBr
- Indium(III) bromide, InBr_{3}; when molten it is dimeric, In_{2}Br_{6}, and it is predominantly dimeric in the gas phase
