= Indium(I) chloride =

Chemical compound

Identifiers
CAS Number	13465-10-6
3D model (JSmol)	Interactive image
ChemSpider	19988783
PubChem CID	71311293
CompTox Dashboard (EPA)	DTXSID901014390
- InChI: InChI=1S/ClH.In/h1H;/q;+1/p-1 Key: APHGZSBLRQFRCA-UHFFFAOYSA-M
- SMILES: Cl[In]

Properties
Appearance	red and yellow
Density	4.218 g/cm^{3}
Melting point	216 °C (421 °F; 489 K)
- Except where otherwise noted, data are given for materials in their standard state (at 25 °C [77 °F], 100 kPa). Infobox references

Indium(I) chloride (also indium monochloride) is the chemical compound with the formula InCl. Indium monochloride occurs as a yellow cubic form below 120 °C and above this temperature as a red orthorhombic form. InCl is one of three known indium chlorides.

== Synthesis and structure ==
InCl can be prepared by heating indium metal with indium trichloride in a sealed tube.

According to X-ray crystallography, the structure of the yellow polymorph resembles that of sodium chloride except that the Cl-In-Cl angles are not 90°, but range between 71 and 130°. The red (high T) polymorph crystallizes in the thallium(I) iodide motif.

== Reactivity ==
The relatively high energy level of the 5s electrons of the indium center make InCl susceptible to oxidation as well as disproportionation into In(0) and InCl_{3}. Tetrahydrofuran (THF) appears to facilitate the disproptionation of InCl as well as other indium(I) halides.

== History ==
Indium(I) chloride was first isolated in 1926 as part of an investigation on the compounds formed between indium and chlorine.
