= Indium chloride =

Indium chloride may refer to:

- Indium monochloride (indium(I) chloride), InCl
- Indium dichloride(indium(II) chloride), InCl_{2}
- Indium trichloride (indium(III) chloride), InCl_{3}
