= Ferdinand Reich =

German chemist (1799–1882)

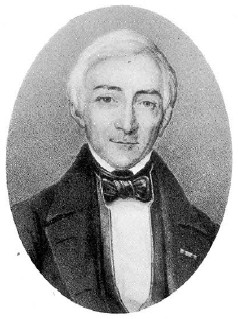
Ferdinand Reich

Ferdinand Reich (19 February 1799 – 27 April 1882) was a German chemist who co-discovered indium in 1863 with Hieronymous Theodor Richter.

Reich was born in Bernburg, Anhalt-Bernburg, Holy Roman Empire and died in Freiberg. He was color blind, or could only see in whites and blacks, and that is why Theodor Richter became his science partner. Richter would examine the colors produced in reactions that they studied.

Reich and Richter ended up isolating the indium, creating a small supply, although it was later found in more regions. They isolated the indium at the Freiberg University of Mining and Technology in Germany.

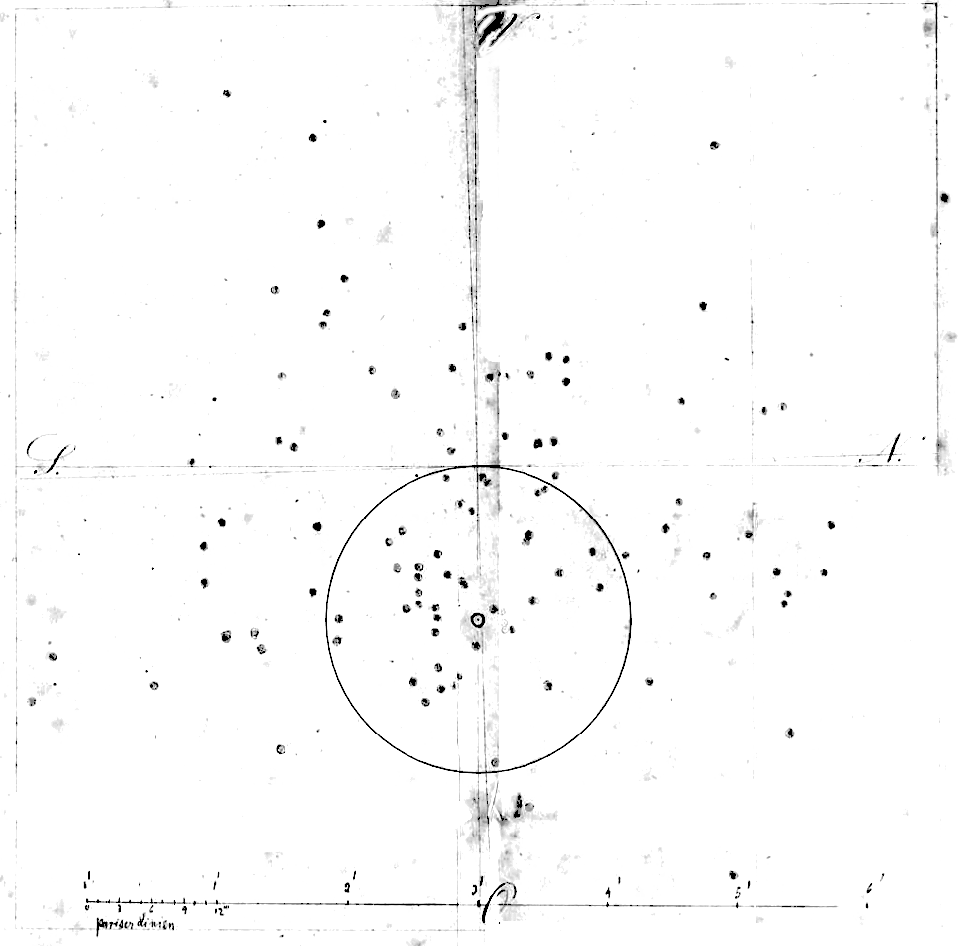
Figure 3 of the book, showing the location of 106 drops of the ball. The center of the image is where the plumbline would land. The 4 directions of the image are N, O, S, W (Nord, Ost, Süd, West). The circle denotes the mean and standard deviation of the drops. The unit line below is in units of the Ligne (pariser linie), equal to 2.2558 mm. The deflection is about 12.6 Paris lines. Digitally contrast-enhanced.

In 1803, Laplace and Gauss both derived that, if a heavy object is dropped from a height $h$ at latitude $\Phi$, and the earth rotates from west to east with angular velocity $\Omega$, then the object would be deflected to the east by a distance of $d=2 / 3 \Omega \cos (\Phi) \sqrt{\left(2 h^3 / g\right)}$. In 1831, Reich set out to test this prediction by actually dropping objects in a mine pit (Drei-Brüder-Schacht, with latitude 50° 53′ 12.5″ N) 158.5 m deep, in Freiberg, Saxony, for 106 times. The average deflection is 2.84 cm to the east and 0.44 cm to the south. The eastward deflection is almost exactly equal to the theoretical value of 2.75 cm, but the southward deflection remains unexplained to this day.

The experiment is published in

- Fallversuche über die Umdrehung der Erde angestellt auf hohe Oberbergamtliche Anordnung in dem Dreibrüderschacht bei Freiberg, Digitized (published in 1832)
