= Indium wire =

Indium is a soft, malleable, silver, shiny metal with atomic weight of 114.818 and resides as number 49 on the Chemical Periodic Table. Indium is a superconductor below 3.4 K, has a resistance of 8.8 micro-ohms at 20 C, a melting point of 156.598 C, a boiling point of 2027 Cº, and a density of 7.31 g/cc. Indium can be alloyed with a wide range of other metals to lower their melting point.

Indium is an ideal thermal interface material for heat dissipation in many of today's very hot integrated circuits. Of all the common materials, copper and aluminum have the highest thermal conductivity. But on the micro level most materials are very rough and a two-piece sandwich of copper may not have a good conductive path between them. To overcome this limitation, indium is the ideal material due to its high bulk thermal conductivity (82W/mK) and its soft compressibility allowing it to fill voids in rough surfaces. In addition, as a seal indium will not pump out or dry out. In fact, indium has the unique ability to cold weld two dissimilar materials if the materials have a thin coating of .002”-.003” of indium they will ‘cold-weld’ together if the clamping pressure is more than 40 psi.

When indium is compressed its bulk thermal conductivity of 82 W/mK pushes down the resistance at the interface to be much lower than greases, fluids, or adhesives. For high power applications there is no better thermal interface material than indium due to its high conductivity, low tensile strength, and ability to alter melting point of alloys, in addition to indium's ability to dissipate great amounts of heat away from sensitive devices.

== Applications ==
- Vacuum seals
- Cryostats
- Dilution Refrigerators
- Optical Windows
- Lasers
- Cryocoolers
- Cold Heads
- Thermal links

== Technical Information ==
- Groove Design

PRODUCTION RATE FOR (5 OZ.) 140 GRAM INGOT

SIZE		LGTH		FT./OZ.	GR./FT.	AREA		GROOVE 'D'
 'W'								(sq. in.)	80% 90%
.020"(0.5mm)	300'		60' (20'/$100)	 .46		.000314	
.030"		135'		27'		1.04		.000706	.020" .021"
.040" (1.0mm)	75'		15'		1.88		.001256	.025" .028"
.050"		50'		10'		2.80	 .001962	.031" .035"
.060"(1.5mm)	35'		7'		4.00	 .002826	.038" .042"
.0625"		32'		6.4'		4.37
.070"		26'		5.2'		5.38		.003846	.044" .049"	
.080"(2.0mm)	20'		4'		7.00	 .005024	.050" .056"
.090"		15'		3'		9.33	 .006358	.056" .064"
.100"		12.5'		2.5'		11.2		.007850	.063" .070"
.125"		8'		1.6'		17.50 .012265	.078" .088"	
.1875"		44"		8.76"	 38.35 .027597	
					 D=Half dia. +.005>.015 min.
Rectangular groove dimensions: [Depth x Width = .80min. x cross section]
