= Indium(II) chloride =

Names
- Other names Indium dichloride, dichloroindium

Identifiers
CAS Number	13465-11-7
3D model (JSmol)	Interactive image; Interactive image
ChemSpider	129563683
ECHA InfoCard	100.155.590
EC Number	627-209-5
PubChem CID	139207
- InChI: InChI=1S/2ClH.In/h2*1H;/q;;+2/p-2 Key: VOWMQUBVXQZOCU-UHFFFAOYSA-L
- SMILES: Cl[In]Cl; [In+].[In+3].[Cl-].[Cl-].[Cl-].[Cl-]

Properties
Chemical formula	Cl_{2}In
Molar mass	185.72 g·mol^{−1}

Related compounds
Related compounds	Tin(II) chloride, Indium(III) chloride

Hazards
- GHS labelling
Pictograms	(GHS07: Exclamation mark)
Signal word	Warning
Hazard statements	H315, H319, H335
Precautionary statements	P261, P264, P271, P280, P302, P305, P338, P351, P352
- Except where otherwise noted, data are given for materials in their standard state (at 25 °C [77 °F], 100 kPa). Infobox references

Indium(II) chloride is an hypothetical inorganic compound with the formula InCl_{2}. Its existence have been disproved and the substance claimed to be indium(II) chloride is a mixture of various indium subchlorides.

== History ==
Indium(II) chloride was first reported to be produced in 1888 by Lars Fredrik Nilson who claimed to have produced indium(II) chloride from the reaction of indium metal and hydrogen chloride gas at 200 °C. However, this has been called into doubt as characterization by X-ray diffraction and NMR failed.

In 1983, an investigation found that the solid claimed to be indium(II) chloride is actually a 5:1 mixture of In_{5}Cl_{9}, alternatively formulated In_{3}[In_{2}Cl_{9}], and InCl_{3}.
