= Hieronymus Theodor Richter =

German chemist (1824–1898)

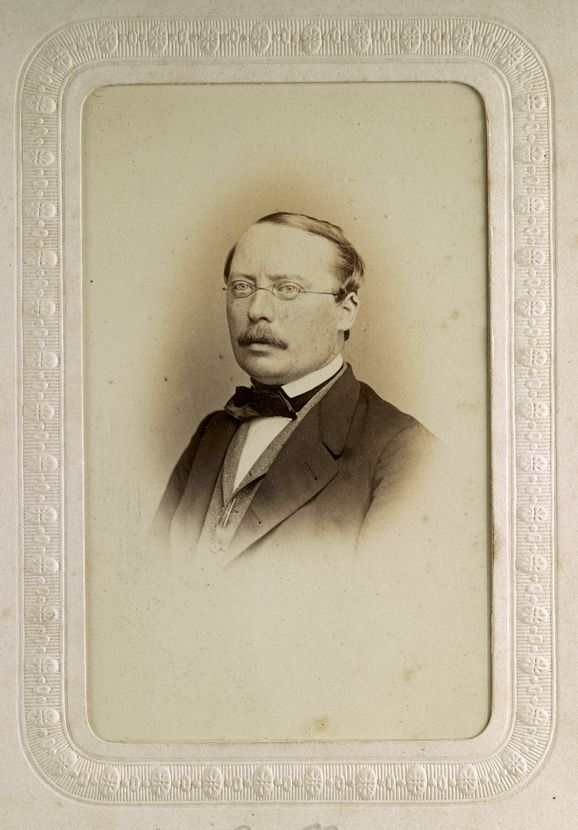
- Hieronymus Theodor Richter, photographed by Ernst Friedrich Wilhelm Hugo Höffert, ca. 1873
- Born: 21 November 1824; Dresden, Saxony
- Died: 25 September 1898 (aged 73); Freiberg, Saxony.
- Citizenship: German
- Known for: Discovery of indium.
- Scientific career
- Fields: Mineralogist
- Workplaces: Freiberg University of Mining and Technology

Hieronymus Theodor Richter (21 November 1824 – 25 September 1898) was a German chemist. In 1863, while working at the Freiberg University of Mining and Technology, he co-discovered indium with Ferdinand Reich.

== Life ==
From 1843 to 1847, he studied at the Bergakademie Freiberg (with Carl Friedrich Plattner, among others) and became a member of the Corps Saxo-Borussia Freiberg. He then worked for the Freiberg Hüttenwerken, since 1853 as a metallurgist chemist.

From 1875 to 1896, Theodor Richter worked as director of the Mining Academy and was the last of the Freiberg directors elected for lifetime. In 1890 he was elected a member of the Leopoldina.

He died September 25, 1898, in Freiberg, Saxony, at the age of 73.

== Honours ==
In 1865, the mineral richterite was named in honour of Richter.

== Literatures ==
- C. Schiffner: From the Life of Old Freiberg Mining Students. E. Maukisch, Freiberg, 1935, pp. 46–48.
- 125 Years of Indium: Lectures from the Colloquium on November 24, 1988, on the Occasion of the 125th Anniversary of the Discovery of Indium by Freiberg Professors F. Reich and Th. Richter. Freiberg: Bergakademie, 1989.
- Winfried Pötsch et al., Lexicon of Significant Chemists, Harri Deutsch, 1989.

== Publications ==
- Preliminary note about a new metal. – In: Journal for practical chemistry. 89 (1863), p. 441–442.
- About the indium. – In: Journal for practical chemistry. 90 (1863), p. 172–176
- About the indium. – In: Journal for practical chemistry. 92 (1864), p. 480–485
- Probirkunst mit dem Lötrohr (1865)
