= Indium(I) bromide =

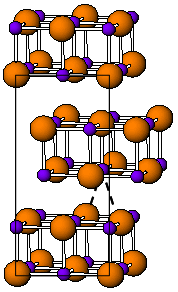

Names
- IUPAC name Indium(I) bromide

Identifiers
| CAS Number | 14280-53-6 |
| 3D model (JSmol) | Interactive image; Interactive image |
| ChemSpider | 21106449 |
| ECHA InfoCard | 100.034.686 |
| PubChem CID | 71317298 |
- InChI: InChI=1S/BrH.In/h1H;/q;+1/p-1 Key: KLRHPHDUDFIRKB-UHFFFAOYSA-M; InChI=1/BrH.In/h1H;/q;+1/p-1 Key: KLRHPHDUDFIRKB-REWHXWOFAH
- SMILES: [In]Br; [In+].[Br-]

Properties
| Chemical formula | InBr |
| Molar mass | 194.722 g/mol |
| Density | 4.960 g/cm^{3} |
| Melting point | 285 °C (545 °F; 558 K) |
| Boiling point | 656 °C (1,213 °F; 929 K) |
- Except where otherwise noted, data are given for materials in their standard state (at 25 °C [77 °F], 100 kPa). verify (what is ?) Infobox references

Indium(I) bromide is a chemical compound of indium and bromine. It is a red crystalline compound that is isostructural with β-TlI and has a distorted rock salt structure. Indium(I) bromide is generally made from the elements, heating indium metal with InBr_{3}. It has been used in the sulfur lamp. In organic chemistry, it has been found to promote the coupling of α, α-dichloroketones to 1-aryl-butane-1,4-diones. Oxidative addition reactions with for example alkyl halides to give alkyl indium halides and with NiBr complexes to give Ni-In bonds are known. It is unstable in water decomposing into indium metal and indium tribromide. When indium dibromide is dissolved in water, InBr is produced as a, presumably, insoluble red precipitate, that then rapidly decomposes.

== See also ==
- Indium halides
