= Indium(III) fluoride =

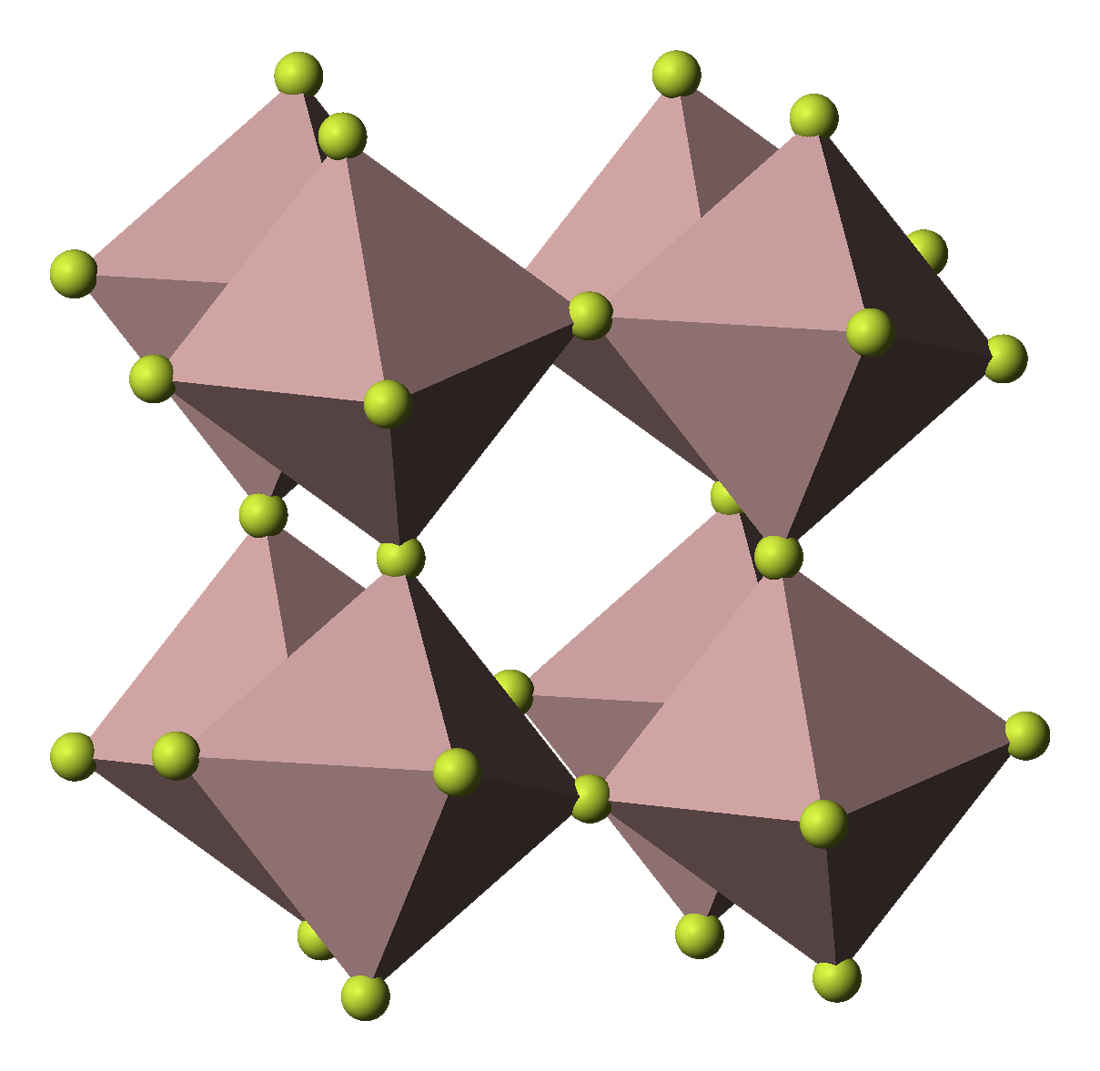

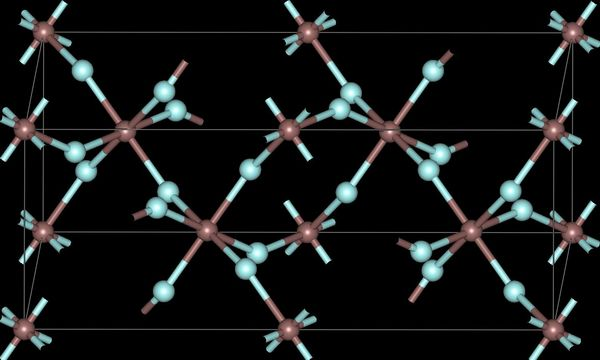

Names
- IUPAC name Indium(III) fluoride
- Other names Indium trifluoride

Identifiers
CAS Number	7783-52-0
3D model (JSmol)	Interactive image
ChemSpider	74192
ECHA InfoCard	100.029.095
EC Number	232-005-0
PubChem CID	82212
UNII	RL4EJ825VN
CompTox Dashboard (EPA)	DTXSID1064825
- InChI: InChI=1S/3FH.In/h3*1H;/q;;;+3/p-3 Key: JNLSTWIBJFIVHZ-UHFFFAOYSA-K
- SMILES: F[In](F)F

Properties
Chemical formula	InF_{3}
Molar mass	171.82 g/mol
Appearance	white solid
Density	4.39 g/cm^{3}
Melting point	1,172 °C (2,142 °F; 1,445 K)

Structure
Crystal structure	Rhombohedral, hR24
Space group	R-3c, No. 167

Hazards
- GHS labelling
Pictograms	(GHS06: Toxic) (GHS07: Exclamation mark)
Signal word	Danger
Hazard statements	H301, H315, H319, H335
Precautionary statements	P261, P264, P271, P280, P302+P352, P304+P340, P305+P351+P338, P312, P321, P332+P313, P337+P313, P362, P403+P233, P405, P501
Flash point	non-flammable

Related compounds
Other anions	Indium(III) chloride Indium(III) bromide Indium(III) iodide
Other cations	Aluminum fluoride Gallium(III) fluoride Thallium(I) fluoride
- Except where otherwise noted, data are given for materials in their standard state (at 25 °C [77 °F], 100 kPa). verify (what is ?) Infobox references

Indium(III) fluoride or indium trifluoride is the inorganic compound with the formula InF_{3}. It is a white solid.

It has a rhombohedral crystal structure very similar to that of rhodium(III) fluoride. Each In center is octahedral. It is formed by the reaction of indium(III) oxide with hydrogen fluoride or hydrofluoric acid.

Indium(III) fluoride is used in the synthesis of non-oxide glasses. It catalyzes the addition of trimethylsilyl cyanide (TMSCN) to aldehydes to form cyanohydrins.
