= Indium(III) iodide =

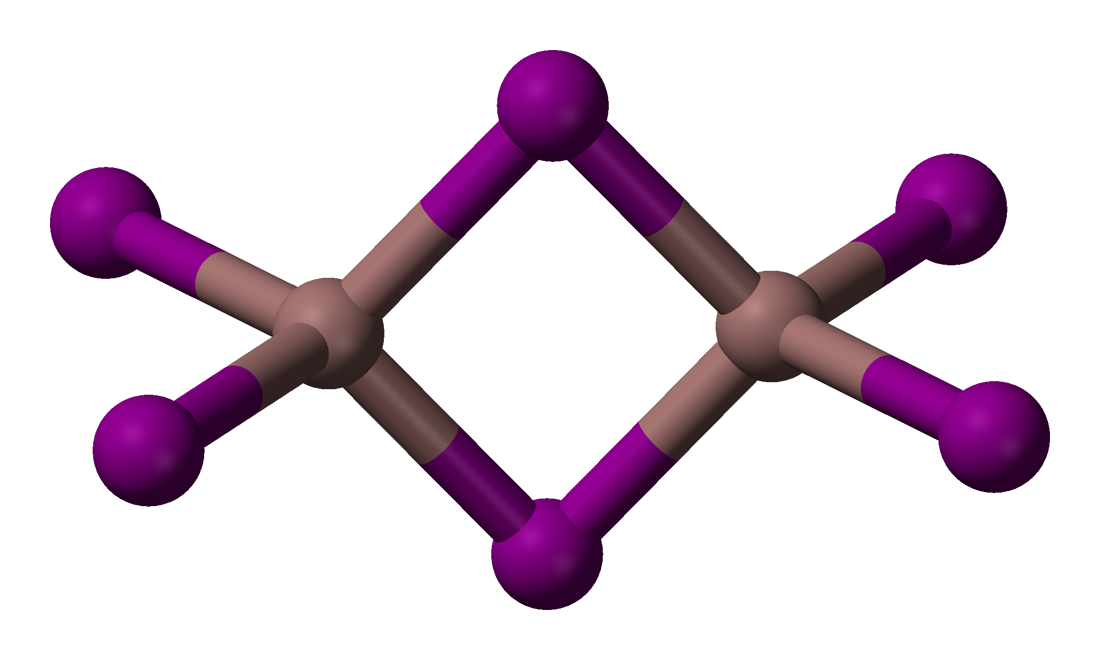

Names
- Other names Indium triiodide

Identifiers
CAS Number	13510-35-5
3D model (JSmol)	Interactive image
ChemSpider	75371
ECHA InfoCard	100.033.475
EC Number	236-839-6
PubChem CID	83539
UNII	3Y156GSM7E
CompTox Dashboard (EPA)	DTXSID5065516
- InChI: InChI=1S/3HI.In/h3*1H;/q;;;+3/p-3 Key: RMUKCGUDVKEQPL-UHFFFAOYSA-K
- SMILES: [In](I)(I)I

Properties
Chemical formula	InI_{3}
Molar mass	495.53 g/mol
Appearance	Yellow solid
Density	4.69 g/cm^{3}
Melting point	210 °C (410 °F; 483 K)
Boiling point	500 °C (932 °F; 773 K)

Related compounds
Other anions	Indium(III) bromide Indium(III) chloride
Other cations	Aluminum iodide Gallium(III) iodide
- Except where otherwise noted, data are given for materials in their standard state (at 25 °C [77 °F], 100 kPa). Infobox references

Indium(III) iodide or indium triiodide is a chemical compound of indium and iodine with the formula InI_{3}.

== Preparation ==
Indium(III) iodide can be obtained by reacting indium with iodine vapor:

2 In + 3I_{2} → 2 InI_{3}

Indium(III) iodide can also be obtained by evaporation of a solution of indium in HI.

== Properties ==
Indium(III) iodide is a pale yellow, very hygroscopic monoclinic solid (space group P2_{1}/c (space group no. 14), a = 9.837 Å, b = 6.102 Å, c = 12.195 Å, β = 107.69°), which melts at 210 °C to form a dark brown liquid and is highly soluble in water. Its crystals consist of dimeric molecules. The yellow β form slowly converts to the red α form. In the presence of water vapor, the compound reacts with oxygen at 245 °C to form indium(III) oxide iodide.

Distinct yellow and red forms are known. The red form undergoes a transition to the yellow at 57 °C. The structure of the red form has not been determined by X-ray crystallography; however, spectroscopic evidence indicates that indium may be six coordinate. The yellow form consists of In_{2}I_{6} with 4 coordinate indium centres.
