= Indium(III) bromide =

Indium tribromide
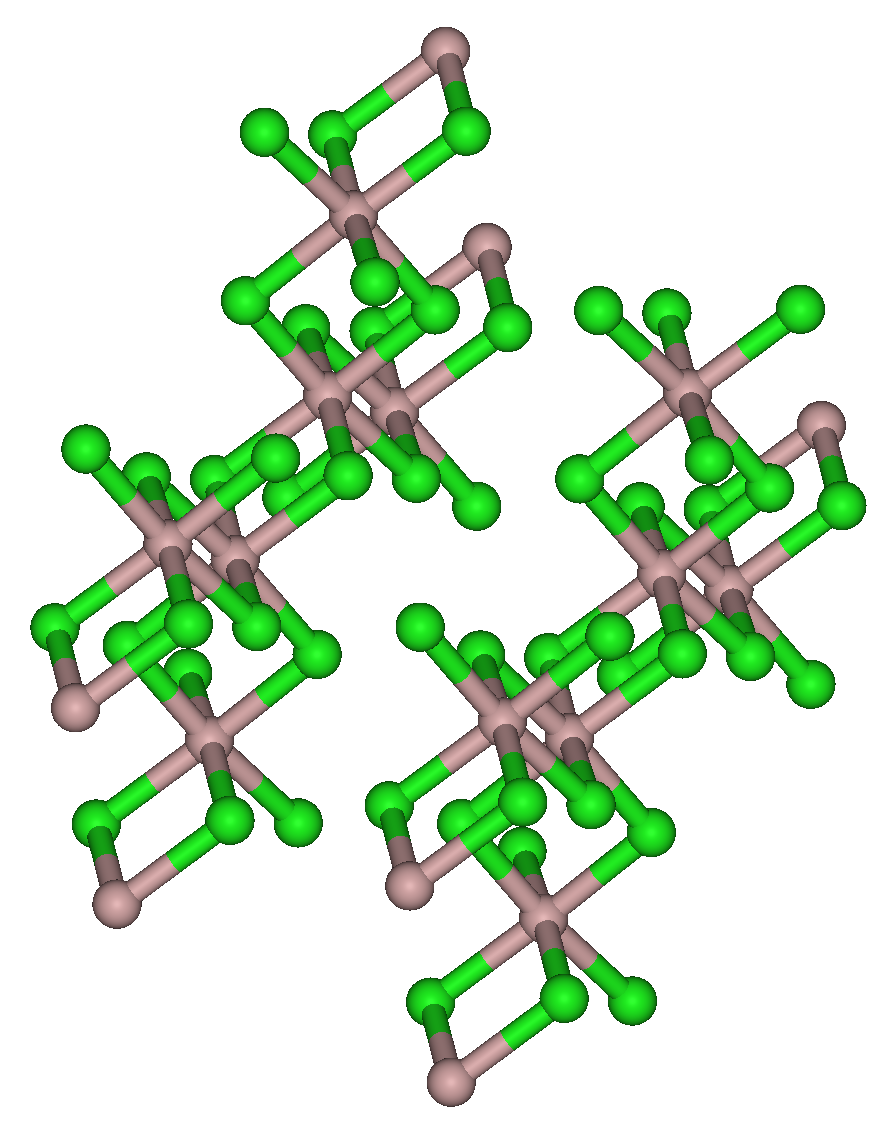

Names
- IUPAC name Indium(III) bromide

Identifiers
| CAS Number | 13465-09-3 |
| 3D model (JSmol) | Interactive image |
| ChemSpider | 24260 |
| ECHA InfoCard | 100.033.343 |
| EC Number | 236-692-8 |
| PubChem CID | 26046 |
| UNII | 0099V88160 |
| CompTox Dashboard (EPA) | DTXSID5065485 |
- InChI: InChI=1S/3BrH.In/h3*1H;/q;;;+3/p-3 Key: JKNHZOAONLKYQL-UHFFFAOYSA-K
- SMILES: Br[In](Br)Br

Properties
| Chemical formula | InBr_{3} |
| Molar mass | 354.530 g/mol |
| Appearance | hygroscopic yellow-white monoclinic crystals |
| Density | 4.74 g/cm^{3} |
| Melting point | 420 °C (788 °F; 693 K) |
| Solubility in water | 414 g/100 mL at 20 °C |
| Magnetic susceptibility (χ) | −107.0·10^{−6} cm^{3}/mol |

Structure
| Crystal structure | Monoclinic, mS16 |
| Space group | C12/m1, No. 12 |

Thermochemistry
| Std enthalpy of formation (Δ_{f}H^{⦵}_{298}) | −428.9 kJ·mol^{−1} |

Hazards
- GHS labelling
| Pictograms | (GHS05: Corrosive) (GHS07: Exclamation mark) |
| Signal word | Danger |
| Hazard statements | H314, H315, H319, H335 |
| Precautionary statements | P260, P264, P271, P280, P301+P330+P331, P302+P352, P303+P361+P353, P304+P340, P305+P351+P338, P310, P312, P321, P332+P313, P337+P313, P362, P363, P403+P233, P405, P501 |

Related compounds
| Other cations | indium(III) fluoride indium(III) chloride indium(III) iodide |
| Related compounds | Indium(I) bromide |
- Except where otherwise noted, data are given for materials in their standard state (at 25 °C [77 °F], 100 kPa). verify (what is ?) Infobox references

Indium(III) bromide, (indium tribromide), InBr_{3}, is a chemical compound of indium and bromine. It is a Lewis acid and has been used in organic synthesis.

== Structure ==
It has the same crystal structure as aluminium trichloride, with 6 coordinate indium atoms. When molten it is dimeric, In_{2}Br_{6}, and predominantly dimeric in the gas phase. The dimer has bridging bromine atoms with a structure similar to dimeric aluminium trichloride Al_{2}Cl_{6}.

== Preparation and reactions ==
It is formed by the reaction of indium and bromine. InBr_{3} forms complexes with ligands, L, InBr_{3}L, InBr_{3}L_{2}, InBr_{3}L_{3}.

Reaction with indium metal forms lower valent indium bromides, InBr_{2}, In_{4}Br_{7}, In_{2}Br_{3}, In_{5}Br_{7}, In_{7}Br_{9}, indium(I) bromide. In refluxing xylene solution InBr_{3} and In metal react to form InBr_{2}.
