= Indium =

Indium, _{49}In
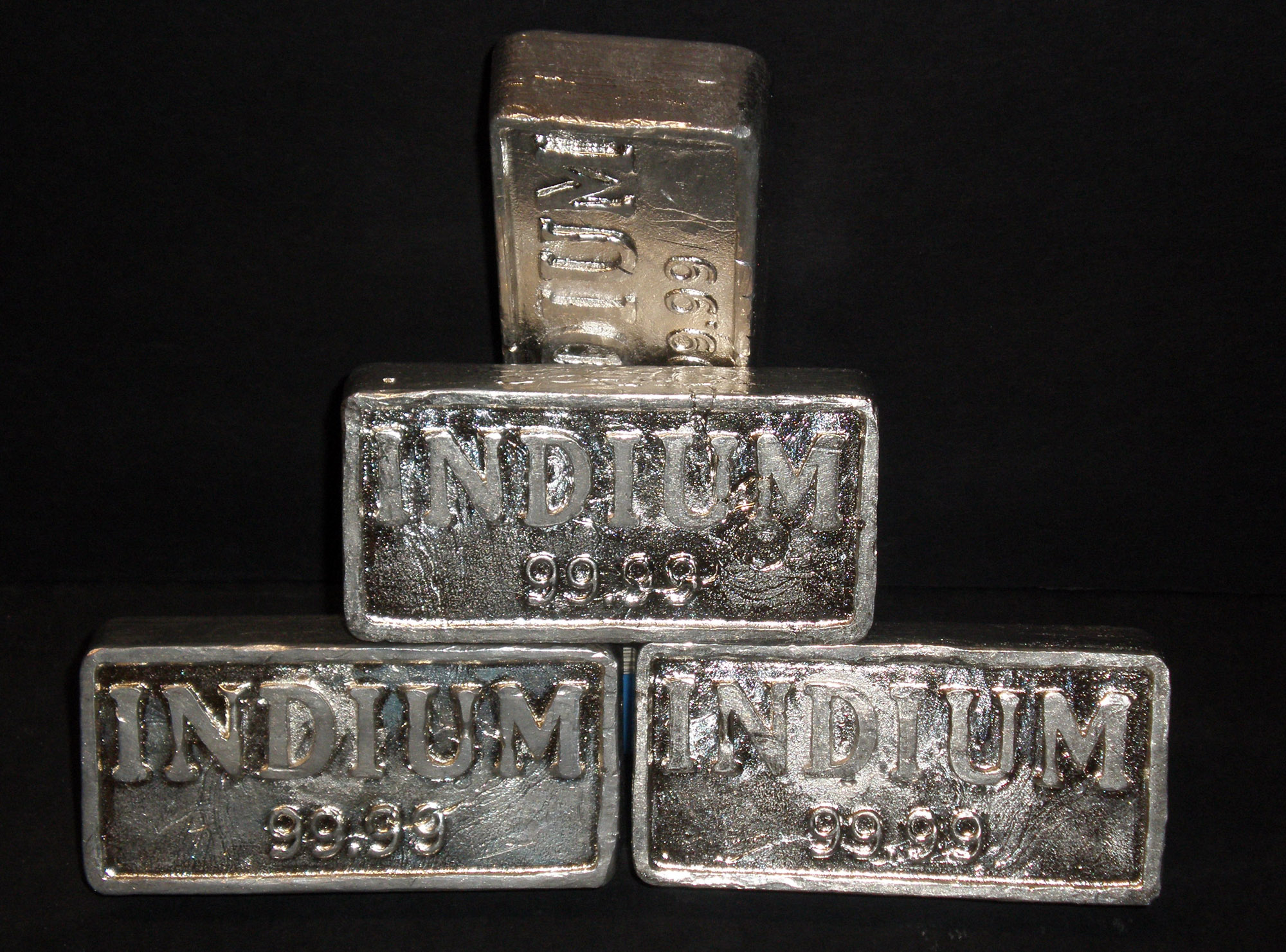

Indium
- Pronunciation: /ˈɪndiəm/ (IN-dee-əm)
- Appearance: silvery lustrous gray

Standard atomic weight A_{r}°(In)
- 114.818±0.001; 114.82±0.01 (abridged)

Indium in the periodic table
Hydrogen																															Helium
Lithium	Beryllium																									Boron	Carbon	Nitrogen	Oxygen	Fluorine	Neon
Sodium	Magnesium																									Aluminium	Silicon	Phosphorus	Sulfur	Chlorine	Argon
Potassium	Calcium															Scandium	Titanium	Vanadium	Chromium	Manganese	Iron	Cobalt	Nickel	Copper	Zinc	Gallium	Germanium	Arsenic	Selenium	Bromine	Krypton
Rubidium	Strontium															Yttrium	Zirconium	Niobium	Molybdenum	Technetium	Ruthenium	Rhodium	Palladium	Silver	Cadmium	Indium	Tin	Antimony	Tellurium	Iodine	Xenon
Caesium	Barium	Lanthanum	Cerium	Praseodymium	Neodymium	Promethium	Samarium	Europium	Gadolinium	Terbium	Dysprosium	Holmium	Erbium	Thulium	Ytterbium	Lutetium	Hafnium	Tantalum	Tungsten	Rhenium	Osmium	Iridium	Platinum	Gold	Mercury (element)	Thallium	Lead	Bismuth	Polonium	Astatine	Radon
Francium	Radium	Actinium	Thorium	Protactinium	Uranium	Neptunium	Plutonium	Americium	Curium	Berkelium	Californium	Einsteinium	Fermium	Mendelevium	Nobelium	Lawrencium	Rutherfordium	Dubnium	Seaborgium	Bohrium	Hassium	Meitnerium	Darmstadtium	Roentgenium	Copernicium	Nihonium	Flerovium	Moscovium	Livermorium	Tennessine	Oganesson
Ga
↑
In
↓
Tl
cadmium ← indium → tin
- Atomic number (Z): 49
- Group: group 13 (boron group)
- Period: period 5
- Block: p-block
- Electron configuration: [Kr] 4d^{10} 5s^{2} 5p^{1}
- Electrons per shell: 2, 8, 18, 18, 3

Physical properties
- Phase at STP: solid
- Melting point: 429.7485 K (156.5985 °C, 313.8773 °F)
- Boiling point: 2345 K (2072 °C, 3762 °F)
- Density (at 20° C): 7.290 g/cm^{3}
- when liquid (at m.p.): 7.02 g/cm^{3}
- Triple point: 429.7445 K, ~1 kPa
- Heat of fusion: 3.281 kJ/mol
- Heat of vaporization: 231.8 kJ/mol
- Molar heat capacity: 26.74 J/(mol·K)
- Specific heat capacity: 232.886 J/(kg·K)
Vapor pressure
P (Pa)	1	10	100	1 k	10 k	100 k
at T (K)	1196	1325	1485	1690	1962	2340

Atomic properties
- Oxidation states: common: +3 −5, −2, −1, 0, +1, +2
- Electronegativity: Pauling scale: 1.78
- Ionization energies: 1st: 558.3 kJ/mol; 2nd: 1820.7 kJ/mol; 3rd: 2704 kJ/mol
- Atomic radius: empirical: 167 pm
- Covalent radius: 142±5 pm
- Van der Waals radius: 193 pm
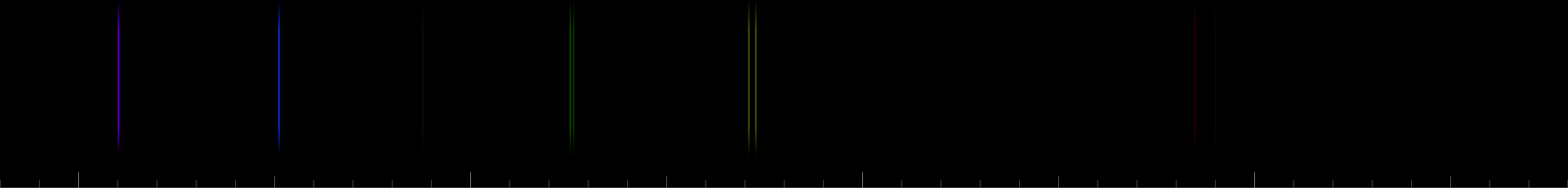
- Spectral lines of indium

Other properties
- Natural occurrence: primordial
- Crystal structure: body-centered tetragonal (tI2)
- Lattice constants: a = 325.16 pm c = 494.71 pm (at 20 °C)
- Thermal expansion: 32.2×10^{−6}/K (at 20 °C) (Note: The thermal expansion is anisotropic: the parameters (at 20 °C) for each crystal axis are α_{a} = 53.2×10^{−6}/K, α_{c} = −9.75×10^{−6}/K, and α_{average} = α_{V}/3 = 32.2×10^{−6}/K.)
- Thermal conductivity: 81.8 W/(m⋅K)
- Electrical resistivity: 83.7 nΩ⋅m (at 20 °C)
- Magnetic ordering: diamagnetic
- Molar magnetic susceptibility: −64.0×10^{−6} cm^{3}/mol (298 K)
- Young's modulus: 11 GPa
- Speed of sound thin rod: 1215 m/s (at 20 °C)
- Mohs hardness: 1.2
- Brinell hardness: 8.8–10.0 MPa
- CAS Number: 7440-74-6

History
- Naming: for the indigo blue line in its spectrum
- Discovery: Ferdinand Reich and Hieronymous Theodor Richter (1863)
- First isolation: Hieronymous Theodor Richter (1864)

Isotopes of indium
Main isotopes			Decay	
Isotope	abundance	half-life (t_{1/2})	mode	product
^{111}In	synth	2.8048 d	ε	^{111}Cd
^{113}In	4.28%	stable		
^{114m}In	synth	49.51 d	IT96.8%	^{114}In
^{114m}In	synth	49.51 d	β^{+}3.25%	^{114}Cd
^{115}In	95.72%	4.41×10^{14} y	β^{−}	^{115}Sn

Indium is a chemical element; its symbol is In and its atomic number is 49. It is a silvery-white post-transition metal and one of the softest elements. Chemically, indium is similar to gallium and thallium, and its properties are largely intermediate between the two. It was discovered in 1863 by Ferdinand Reich and Hieronymous Theodor Richter by spectroscopic methods and named for the indigo blue line in its spectrum.

Indium is used primarily in the production of flat-panel displays as indium tin oxide (ITO), a transparent and conductive coating applied to glass. It is also used in the semiconductor industry, in low-melting-point metal alloys such as solders and soft-metal high-vacuum seals. It is used in the manufacture of blue and white LED circuits, mainly to produce Indium gallium nitride p-type semiconductor substrates. It is produced exclusively as a by-product during the processing of the ores of other metals, chiefly from sphalerite and other zinc sulfide ores.

Indium has no biological role and its compounds are toxic when inhaled or injected into the bloodstream, although they are poorly absorbed following ingestion. Indium has no metabolic role in any organism that has been studied.

== Etymology ==
The name comes from the Latin word indicum meaning violet or indigo. The word indicum means "Indian", as the naturally based dye indigo was originally exported to Europe from India.

== Properties ==
=== Physical ===
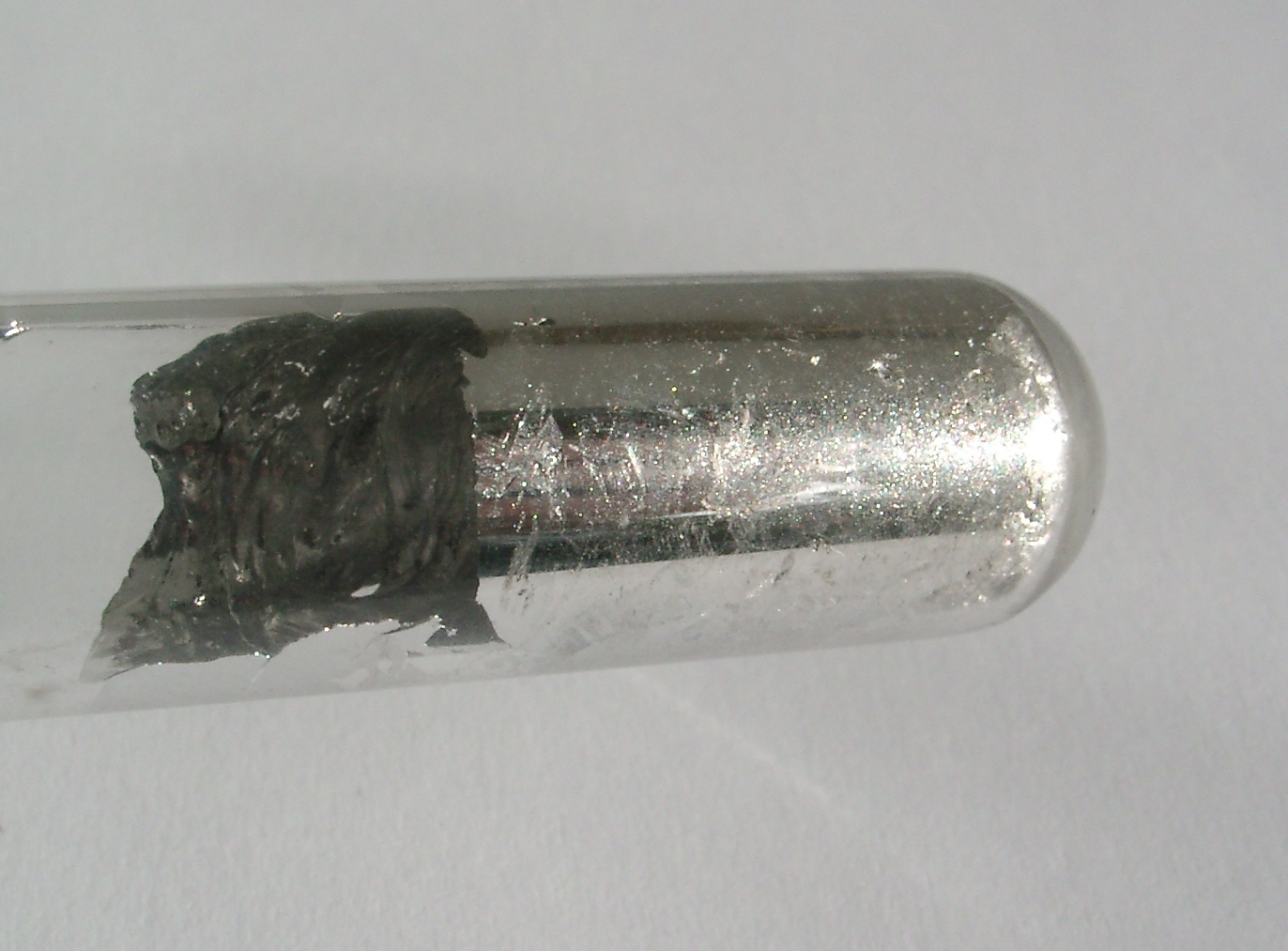
Indium wetting the glass surface of a test tube

Indium is a shiny silvery-white, highly ductile post-transition metal with a bright luster. It is so soft (Mohs hardness 1.2) that it can be cut with a knife or be bitten into by human teeth. Indium also leaves a visible line like a pencil when rubbed on paper. It is a member of group 13 on the periodic table and its properties are mostly intermediate between its vertical neighbors gallium and thallium. As with tin, a high-pitched cry is heard when indium is bent – a crackling sound due to crystal twinning. Like gallium, indium is able to wet glass and has a low melting point, 156.6 °C (314 °F), higher than its lighter homologue, gallium, but lower than its heavier homologue, thallium, and lower than tin. The boiling point is 2072 °C (3762 °F), higher than that of thallium, but lower than gallium, conversely to the general trend of melting points, but similarly to the trends down the other post-transition metal groups because of the weakness of the metallic bonding with few electrons delocalized.

The density of indium, 7.31 g/cm^{3}, is also greater than gallium, but lower than thallium. Below the critical temperature, 3.41 K, indium becomes a superconductor. Indium crystallizes in the body-centered tetragonal crystal system in the space group I4/mmm (lattice parameters: a = 325 pm, c = 495 pm): this is a slightly distorted face-centered cubic structure, where each indium atom has four neighbours at 324 pm distance and eight neighbours slightly further (336 pm). Indium has greater solubility in liquid mercury than any other metal (more than 50 mass percent of indium at 0 °C). Indium displays a ductile viscoplastic response, found to be size-independent in tension and compression. However it does have a size effect in bending and indentation, associated to a length-scale of order 50–100 μm, significantly large when compared with other metals.

=== Isotopes ===
Indium has 39 known isotopes, ranging in mass number from 97 to 135. Only two isotopes occur naturally as primordial nuclides: indium-113, the only stable isotope, and indium-115, which has a half-life of 4.41×10^{14} years, four orders of magnitude greater than the age of the Universe and nearly 30,000 times greater than half-life of thorium-232. The half-life of ^{115}In is very long because the beta decay to ^{115}Sn is spin-forbidden. Indium-115 makes up 95.7% of all indium. Indium is one of three known elements (the others being tellurium and rhenium) of which the stable isotope is less abundant in nature than the long-lived primordial radioisotopes.

The stablest artificial isotope is indium-111, with a half-life of approximately 2.8 days. All other isotopes have half-lives shorter than 5 hours. Indium also has 47 meta states, among which indium-114m1 (half-life about 49.51 days) is the most stable, more stable than the ground state of any indium isotope other than the primordial. All decay by isomeric transition. The indium isotopes lighter than ^{113}In predominantly decay through electron capture or positron emission to form cadmium isotopes, while the indium isotopes heavier than ^{113}In predominantly decay through beta-minus decay to form tin isotopes.

== Chemistry ==
Indium has 49 electrons, with an electronic configuration of [Kr]4d^{10}5s^{2}5p^{1}. In compounds, indium most commonly donates the three outermost electrons to become indium(III), In^{3+}. In some cases, the pair of 5s-electrons are not donated, resulting in indium(I), In^{+}. The stabilization of the monovalent state is attributed to the inert pair effect, in which relativistic effects lowers the energy of the 5s-orbital, observed in heavier elements. Thallium (indium's heavier homolog) shows an even stronger effect, manifested by the pervasiveness of thallium(I) vs thallium(III), Gallium (indium's lighter homolog) is only rarely observed in the +1 oxidation state. Thus, although thallium(III) is a moderately strong oxidizing agent, indium(III) is not, and many indium(I) compounds are powerful reducing agents. While the energy required to include the s-electrons in chemical bonding is lowest for indium among the group 13 metals, bond energies decrease down the group so that by indium, the energy released in forming two additional bonds and attaining the +3 state is not always enough to outweigh the energy needed to involve the 5s-electrons. Indium(I) oxide and hydroxide are more basic and indium(III) oxide and hydroxide are more acidic.

A number of standard electrode potentials, depending on the reaction under study, are reported for indium, reflecting the decreased stability of the +3 oxidation state:

In^{2+} + e^{−}	⇌ In^{+}	E^{0} = −0.40 V
In^{3+} + e^{−}	⇌ In^{2+}	E^{0} = −0.49 V
In^{3+} + 2 e^{−}	⇌ In^{+}	E^{0} = −0.443 V
In^{3+} + 3 e^{−}	⇌ In	E^{0} = −0.3382 V
In^{+} + e^{−}	⇌ In	E^{0} = −0.14 V

Indium metal does not react with water, but it is oxidized by stronger oxidizing agents such as halogens to give indium(III) compounds. It does not form a boride, silicide, or carbide. Indium is rather basic in aqueous solution, showing only slight amphoteric characteristics, and unlike its lighter homologs aluminium and gallium, it is insoluble in aqueous alkaline solutions.

=== Indium(III) compounds ===
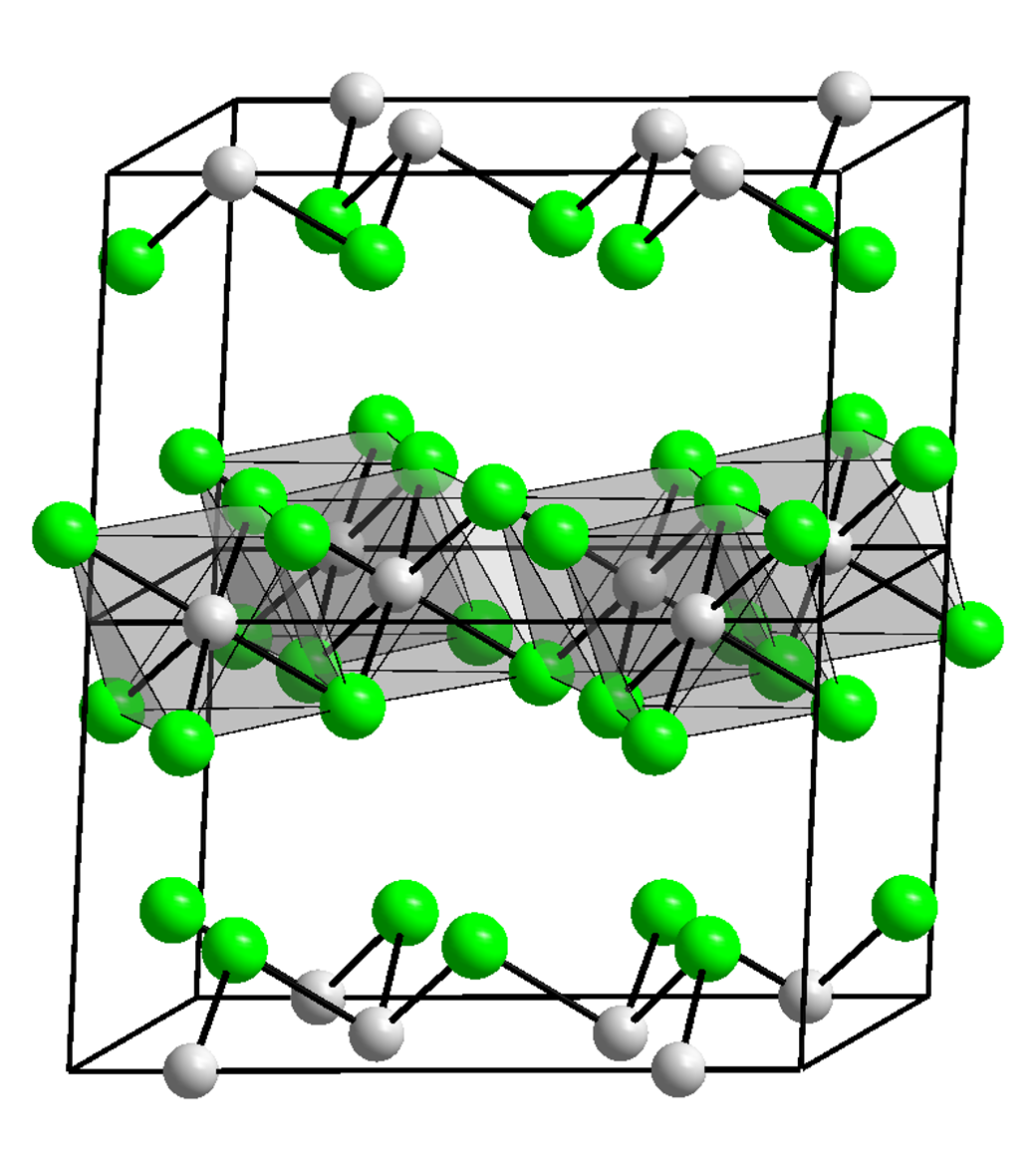
InCl_{3} (structure pictured) is a common compound of indium.

==== Hydrides and halides ====
The hydride InH_{3} has at best a transitory existence in ethereal solutions at low temperatures. It polymerizes in the absence of bases. Lewis bases stabilize a rich collection of indium hydrides of the formula LInH_{3} (L = tertiary phosphine and N-Heterocyclic carbenes).

Chlorination, bromination, and iodination of In produce colorless InCl_{3}, InBr_{3}, and yellow InI_{3}. The compounds are Lewis acids, somewhat akin to the better known aluminium trihalides. Again like the related aluminium compound, InF_{3} is polymeric.

Indium halides dissolves in water to give aquo complexes such as [In(H_{2}O)_{6}]^{3+} and [InCl_{2}(H_{2}O)_{4}]^{+}. Similar complexes can be prepared from nitrates and acetates. Overall, the pattern is similar to that for aluminium(III).

==== Chalcogenides and pnictides ====
Indium derivatives of chalcogenides (O, S, Se, Te) are well developed. Indium(III) oxide, In_{2}O_{3}, forms when indium metal is burned in air or when the hydroxide or nitrate is heated. The analogous sesqui-chalcogenides with sulfur, selenium, and tellurium are also known.

The chemistry of indium pnictides (N, P, As, Sb) is also well known, motivated by their relevance to semiconductor technology. For applications in microelectronics, the P, As, and Sb derivatives are made by reactions of trimethylindium:

In(CH_{3})_{3} + H_{3}E → InE + 3 CH_{4} (E = P, As, Sb)

Many of these derivatives are prone to hydrolysis.

=== Indium(I) compounds ===
Indium(I) compounds are not common. The chloride, bromide, and iodide are deeply colored, unlike the parent trihalides from which they are prepared. The fluoride is known only as an unstable gas. Indium(I) oxide black powder is produced when indium(III) oxide decomposes upon heating to 700 °C.

=== Compounds in other oxidation states ===
Less frequently, indium forms compounds in oxidation state +2 and even fractional oxidation states. Usually such materials feature In–In bonding, most notably in the halides In_{2}X_{4} and [In_{2}X_{6}]^{2−}, and various subchalcogenides such as In_{4}Se_{3}. Several other compounds are known to combine indium(I) and indium(III), such as In^{I}_{6}(In^{III}Cl_{6})Cl_{3}, In^{I}_{5}(In^{III}Br_{4})_{2}(In^{III}Br_{6}), and In^{I}In^{III}Br_{4}.

=== Organoindium compounds ===
Organoindium compounds feature In–C bonds. Most are In(III) derivatives, but cyclopentadienylindium(I) is an exception. It was the first known organoindium(I) compound, and is polymeric, consisting of zigzag chains of alternating indium atoms and cyclopentadienyl complexes. Perhaps the best-known organoindium compound is trimethylindium, In(CH_{3})_{3}, used to prepare certain semiconducting materials.

== History ==
In 1863, German chemists Ferdinand Reich and Hieronymus Theodor Richter were testing ores from the mines around Freiberg, Saxony. They dissolved the minerals pyrite, arsenopyrite, galena and sphalerite in hydrochloric acid and distilled raw zinc chloride. Reich, who was color-blind, employed Richter as an assistant for detecting the colored spectral lines. Knowing that ores from that region sometimes contain thallium, they searched for the green thallium emission spectrum lines. Instead, they found a bright blue line. Because that blue line did not match any known element, they hypothesized a new element was present in the minerals. They named the element indium, from the indigo color seen in its spectrum, after the Latin indicum, meaning 'of India'.

Richter went on to isolate the metal in 1864. An ingot of 0.5 kg (1.1 lb) was presented at the World Fair 1867. Reich and Richter later fell out when Richter claimed to be the sole discoverer.

== Occurrence ==
The s-process acting in the range from silver to antimony

Indium is created by the long-lasting (up to thousands of years) s-process (slow neutron capture) in low-to-medium-mass stars (range in mass between 0.6 and 10 solar masses). When a silver-109 atom captures a neutron, it transmutes into silver-110, which then undergoes beta decay to become cadmium-110. Capturing further neutrons, it becomes cadmium-115, which decays to indium-115 by another beta decay. This explains why the radioactive isotope is more abundant than the stable one. The stable indium isotope, indium-113, is one of the p-nuclei, the origin of which is not fully understood; although indium-113 is known to be made directly in the s- and r-processes (rapid neutron capture), and also as the daughter of very long-lived cadmium-113, which has a half-life of about eight quadrillion years, this cannot account for all indium-113.

Indium is the 68th most abundant element in Earth's crust at approximately 50 ppb. This is similar to the crustal abundance of silver, bismuth and mercury. It very rarely forms its own minerals, or occurs in elemental form. Fewer than 10 indium minerals such as roquesite (CuInS_{2}) are known, and none occur at sufficient concentrations for economic extraction. Instead, indium is usually a trace constituent of more common ore minerals, such as sphalerite and chalcopyrite. From these, it can be extracted as a by-product during smelting. While the enrichment of indium in these deposits is high relative to its crustal abundance, it is insufficient, at current prices, to support extraction of indium as the main product.

Different estimates exist of the amounts of indium contained within the ores of other metals. However, these amounts are not extractable without mining of the host materials (see Production and availability). Thus, the availability of indium is fundamentally determined by the rate at which these ores are extracted, and not their absolute amount. This is an aspect that is often forgotten in the current debate, e.g. by the Graedel group at Yale in their criticality assessments, explaining the paradoxically low depletion times some studies cite.

== Production and availability ==
Refined indium reserves

World production trend

Indium is produced exclusively as a by-product during the processing of the ores of other metals. Its main source materials are sulfidic zinc ores, where it is mostly hosted by sphalerite. Minor amounts are also extracted from sulfidic copper ores. During the roast-leach-electrowinning process of zinc smelting, indium accumulates in the iron-rich residues. From these, it can be extracted in different ways. It may also be recovered directly from the process solutions. Further purification is done by electrolysis. The exact process varies with the mode of operation of the smelter.

Its by-product status means that indium production is constrained by the amount of sulfidic zinc (and copper) ores extracted each year. Therefore, its availability needs to be discussed in terms of supply potential. The supply potential of a by-product is defined as that amount which is economically extractable from its host materials per year under current market conditions (i.e. technology and price). Reserves and resources are not relevant for by-products, since they cannot be extracted independently from the main-products. Recent estimates put the supply potential of indium at a minimum of 1,300 t/yr from sulfidic zinc ores and 20 t/yr from sulfidic copper ores. These figures are significantly greater than current production (655 t in 2016). Thus, major future increases in the by-product production of indium will be possible without significant increases in production costs or price. The average indium price in 2016 was US$240/kg, down from US$705/kg in 2014.

China is a leading producer of indium (290 tonnes in 2016), followed by South Korea (195 t), Japan (70 t) and Canada (65 t). The Teck Resources refinery in Trail, British Columbia, is a large single-source indium producer, with an output of 40 tonnes in 2023, 39 tonnes in 2022, and 44.3 tonnes in 2021.

The primary consumption of indium worldwide is LCD production. Demand rose rapidly from the late 1990s to 2010 with the popularity of LCD computer monitors and television sets, which now account for 50% of indium consumption. Increased manufacturing efficiency and recycling (especially in Japan) maintain a balance between demand and supply. According to the UNEP, indium's end-of-life recycling rate is less than 1%.

== Applications ==
=== Industrial uses ===
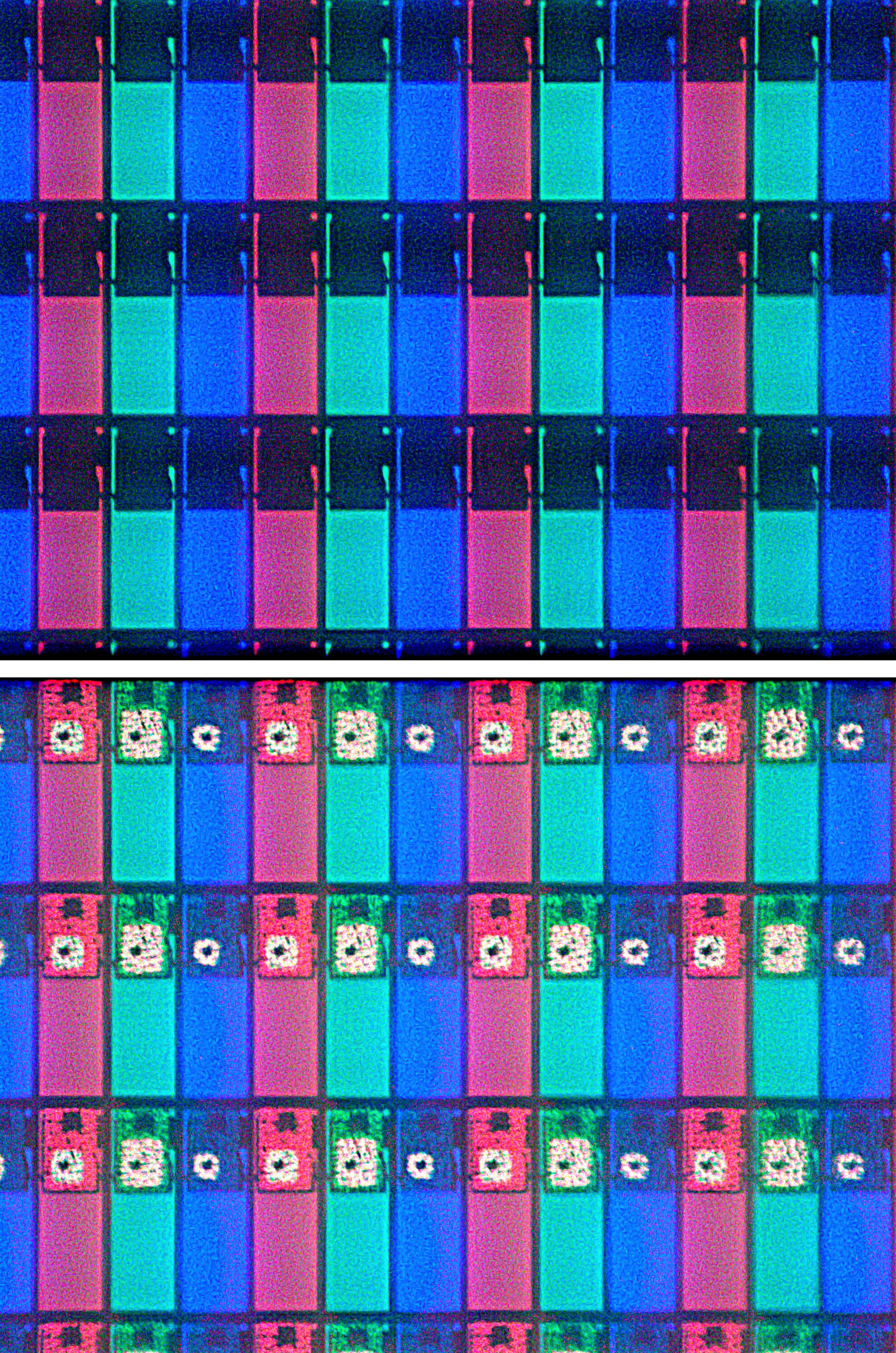
A magnified image of an LCD screen showing RGB pixels. Individual transistors are seen as white dots in the bottom part.

In 1924, indium was found to have a valued property of stabilizing non-ferrous metals, and that became the first significant use for the element. The first large-scale application for indium was coating bearings in high-performance aircraft engines during World War II, to protect against damage and corrosion; this is no longer a major use of the element. New uses were found in fusible alloys, solders, and electronics. In the 1950s, tiny beads of indium were used for the emitters and collectors of PNP alloy-junction transistors. In the middle and late 1980s, the development of indium phosphide semiconductors and indium tin oxide thin films for liquid-crystal displays (LCD) aroused much interest. By 1992, the thin-film application had become the largest end use.

Indium(III) oxide and indium tin oxide (ITO) are used as a transparent conductive coating on glass substrates in electroluminescent panels. Indium tin oxide is used as an infrared radiation filter in low-pressure sodium-vapor lamps. The infrared radiation is reflected back into the lamp, which increases the temperature within the tube and improves the performance of the lamp.

Indium has many semiconductor-related applications. Some indium compounds, such as indium antimonide and indium phosphide, are semiconductors with useful properties: one precursor is usually trimethylindium (TMI), which is also used as the semiconductor dopant in II–VI compound semiconductors. InAs and InSb are used for low-temperature transistors and InP for high-temperature transistors. The compound semiconductors InGaN and InGaP are used in light-emitting diodes (LEDs) and laser diodes. Indium is used in photovoltaics as the semiconductor copper indium gallium selenide (CIGS), also called CIGS solar cells, a type of second-generation thin-film solar cell. Indium is used in PNP bipolar junction transistors with germanium: when soldered at low temperature, indium does not stress the germanium.

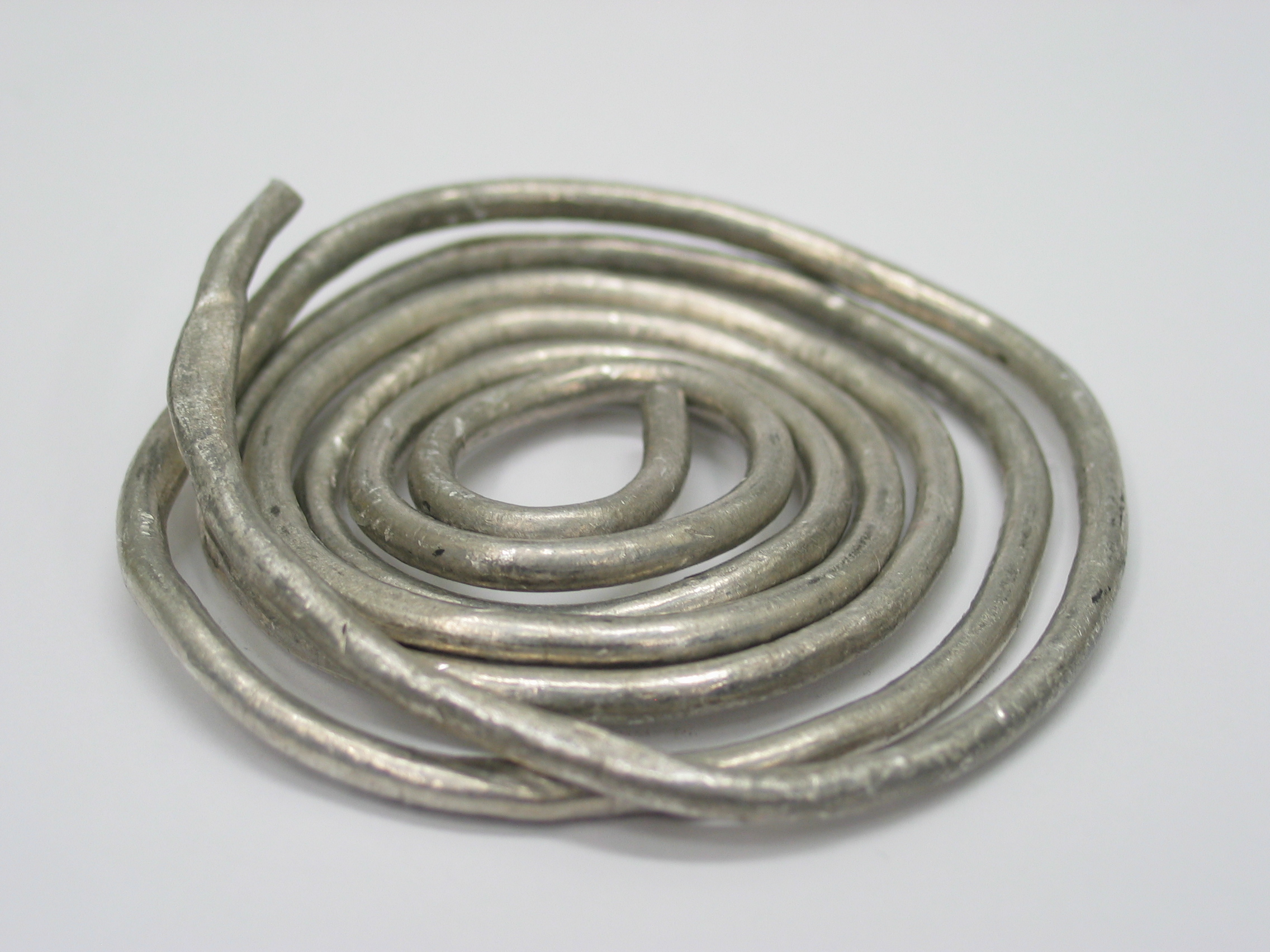
Ductile indium wire

Indium wire is used as a vacuum seal and a thermal conductor in cryogenics and ultra-high-vacuum applications, in such manufacturing applications as gaskets that deform to fill gaps. Owing to its great plasticity and adhesion to metals, Indium sheets are sometimes used for cold-soldering in microwave circuits and waveguide joints, where direct soldering is complicated. Indium is an ingredient in the gallium–indium–tin alloy galinstan, which is liquid at room temperature and replaces mercury in some thermometers. Other alloys of indium with bismuth, cadmium, lead, and tin, which have higher but still low melting points (between 50 and 100 °C), are used in fire sprinkler systems and heat regulators.

Indium is one of many substitutes for mercury in alkaline batteries to prevent the zinc from corroding and releasing hydrogen gas. Indium is added to some dental amalgam alloys to decrease the surface tension of the mercury and allow for less mercury and easier amalgamation.

Indium's high neutron-capture cross-section for thermal neutrons makes it suitable for use in control rods for nuclear reactors, typically in an alloy of 80% silver, 15% indium, and 5% cadmium. In nuclear engineering, the (n,n') reactions of ^{113}In and ^{115}In are used to determine magnitudes of neutron fluxes.

Indium
Hazards
- GHS labelling
Pictograms	(GHS07: Exclamation mark)
Signal word	Warning
Hazard statements	H302, H312, H315, H319, H332, H335
Precautionary statements	P261, P280, P305+P351+P338
NFPA 704 (fire diamond)	1 0 0

In 2009, Professor Mas Subramanian and former graduate student Andrew Smith at Oregon State University discovered that indium can be combined with yttrium and manganese to form an intensely blue, non-toxic, inert, fade-resistant pigment, YInMn Blue, the first new inorganic blue pigment discovered in 200 years.

According to one overview, "[there is] no evidence of any health hazard from industrial use of indium."

=== Medical applications ===
Radioactive indium-111 (in very small amounts) is used in nuclear medicine tests, as a radiotracer to follow the movement of labeled proteins and white blood cells to diagnose different types of infection. Indium compounds are mostly not absorbed upon ingestion and are only moderately absorbed on inhalation; they tend to be stored temporarily in the muscles, skin, and bones before being excreted, and the biological half-life of indium is about two weeks in humans. It is also tagged to growth hormone analogues like octreotide to find growth hormone receptors in neuroendocrine tumors.

== Sources ==
- Greenwood, Norman N.; Earnshaw, Alan (1984). Chemistry of the Elements. Oxford: Pergamon Press. ISBN 978-0-08-022057-4.
