= Indium(III) chloride =

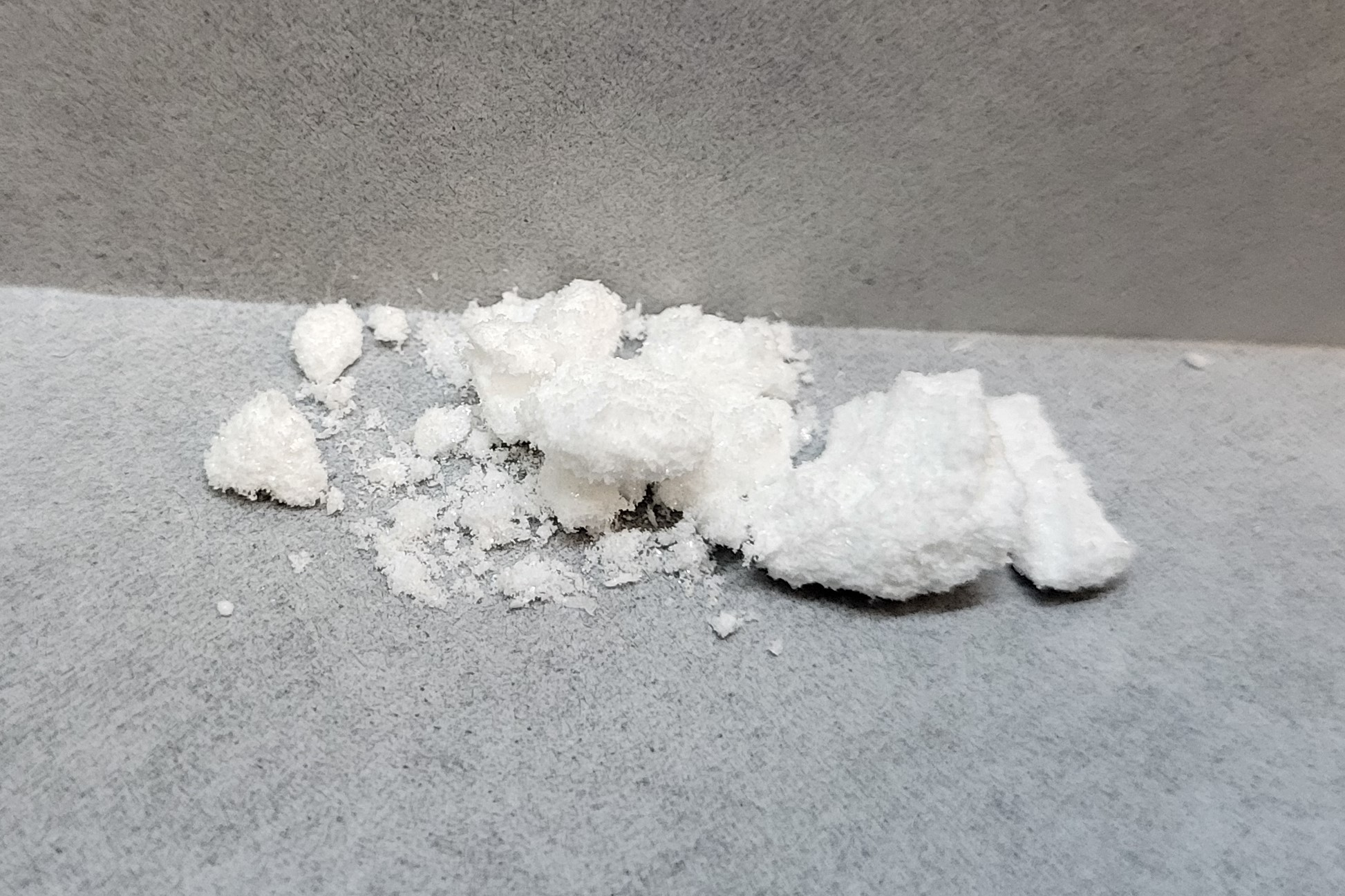
- Anhydrous

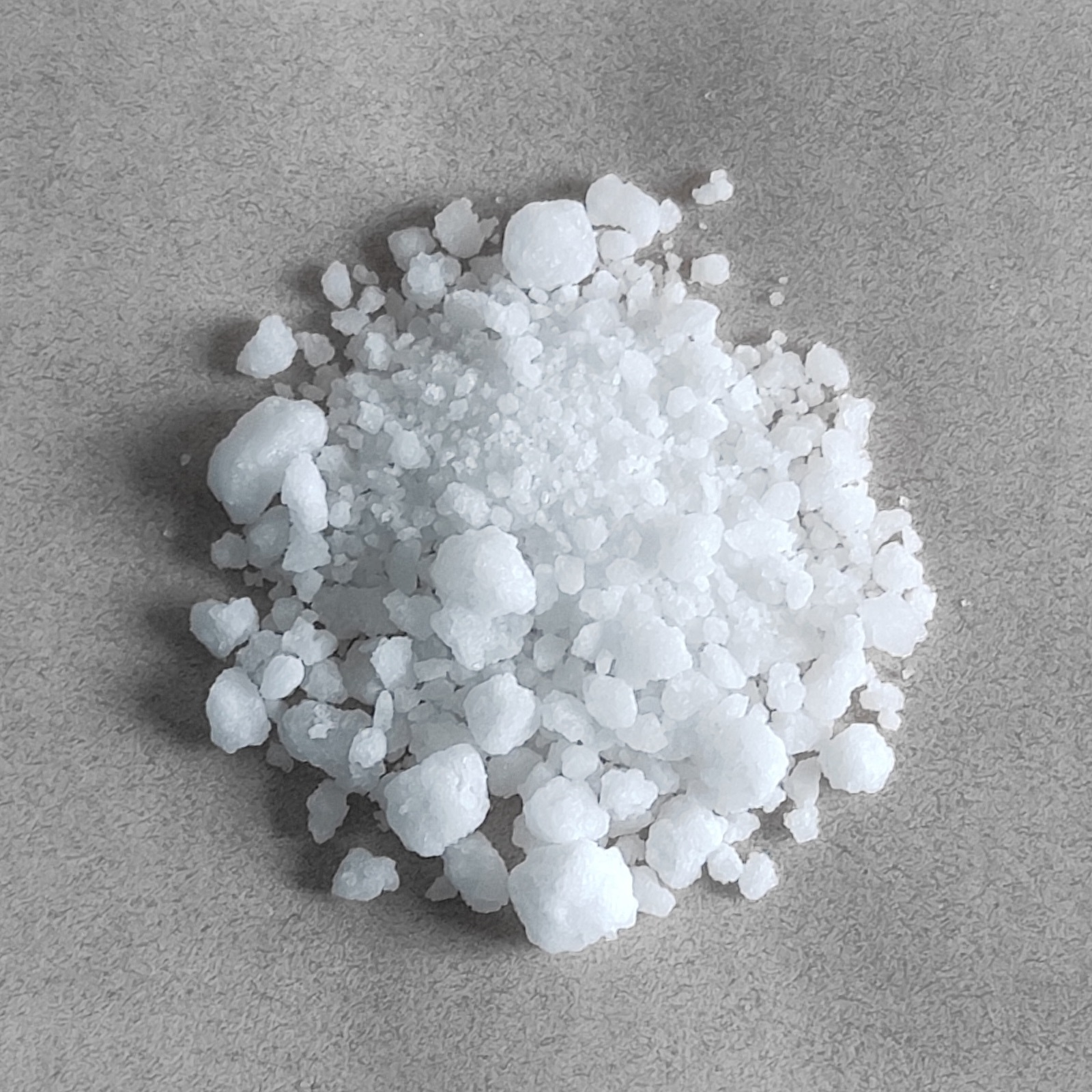
- Tetrahydrate

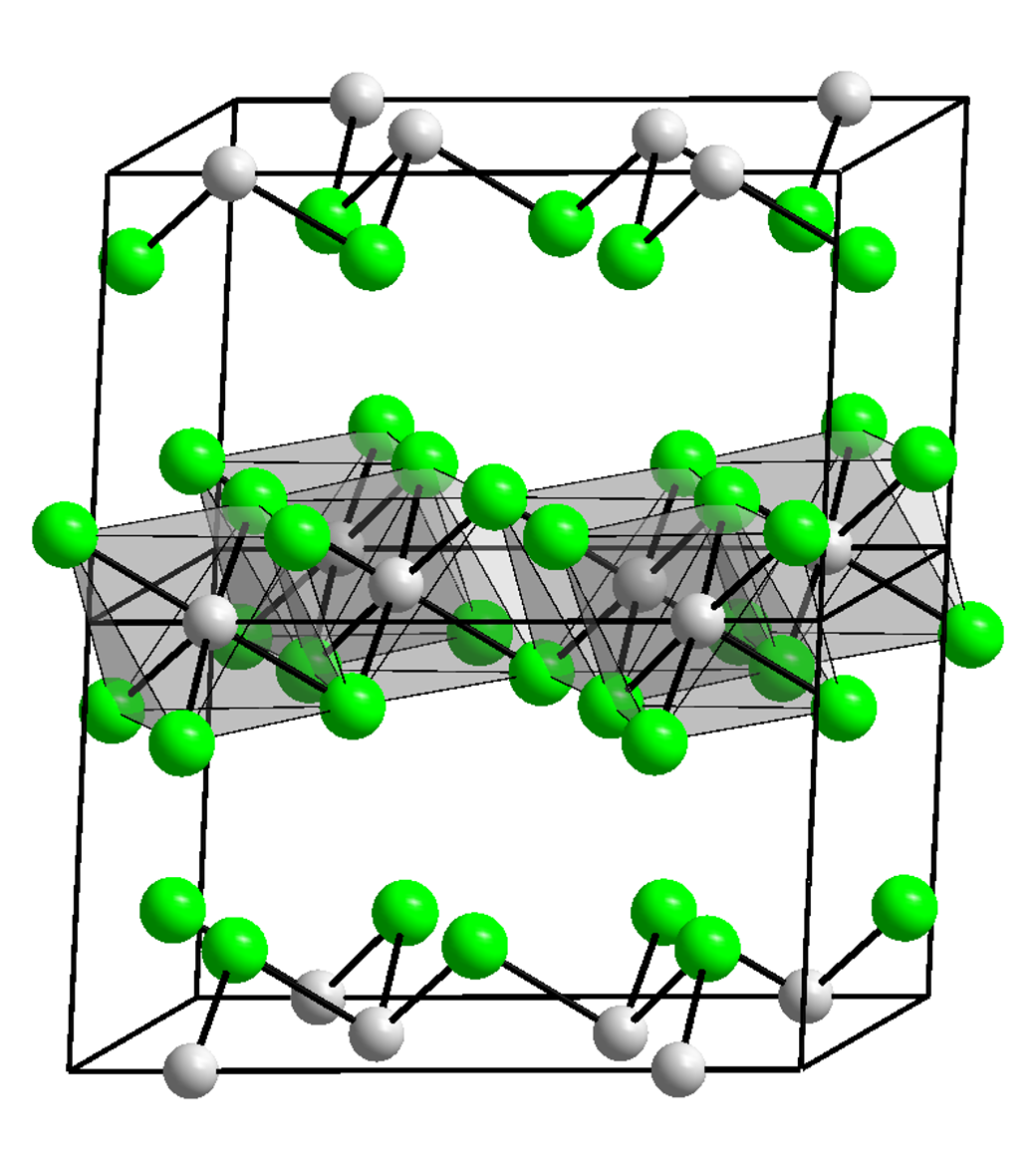
- Indium(III) chloride

Names
- Other names Indium chloride Indium trichloride

Identifiers
CAS Number	10025-82-8
3D model (JSmol)	Interactive image
ChemSpider	23197
ECHA InfoCard	100.030.027
EC Number	233-043-0
PubChem CID	24812
RTECS number	NL1400000
UNII	31JB8MKF8Z
UN number	3260
CompTox Dashboard (EPA)	DTXSID8033566
- InChI: InChI=1S/3ClH.In/h3*1H;/q;;;+3/p-3 Key: PSCMQHVBLHHWTO-UHFFFAOYSA-K; InChI=1/3ClH.In/h3*1H;/q;;;+3/p-3 Key: PSCMQHVBLHHWTO-DFZHHIFOAF
- SMILES: Cl[In](Cl)Cl

Properties
Chemical formula	InCl_{3}
Molar mass	221.17 g·mol^{−1}
Appearance	white flakes
Density	3.46 g/cm^{3}
Melting point	586 °C (1,087 °F; 859 K)
Boiling point	800 °C (1,470 °F; 1,070 K)
Solubility in water	195 g/100 mL, exothermic
Solubility in other solvents	THF, Ethanol

Structure
Crystal structure	Monoclinic, mS16
Space group	C12/m1, No. 12

Hazards
- Occupational safety and health (OHS/OSH)
Main hazards	Corrosive
- GHS labelling
Pictograms	(GHS05: Corrosive) (GHS07: Exclamation mark)
Signal word	Danger
Hazard statements	H302, H314
Precautionary statements	P260, P301+P330+P331, P303+P361+P353, P305+P351+P338, P405, P501
NFPA 704 (fire diamond)	2 0 0

Related compounds
Other anions	Indium(III) fluoride Indium(III) bromide Indium(III) iodide
Other cations	Boron trichloride Aluminium chloride Gallium trichloride Thallium(III) chloride
Related compounds	Yttrium(III) chloride
- Except where otherwise noted, data are given for materials in their standard state (at 25 °C [77 °F], 100 kPa). verify (what is ?) Infobox references

Indium(III) chloride is the chemical compound with the formula InCl_{3} which forms a tetrahydrate. This salt is a white, flaky solid with applications in organic synthesis as a Lewis acid. It is also the most available soluble derivative of indium. This is one of three known indium chlorides.

== Synthesis and structure ==
Being a relatively electropositive metal, indium reacts quickly with chlorine to give the trichloride. Indium trichloride is very soluble and deliquescent. A synthesis has been reported using an electrochemical cell in a mixed methanol-benzene solution.

Like AlCl_{3} and TlCl_{3}, InCl_{3} crystallizes as a layered structure consisting of a close-packed chloride arrangement containing layers of octahedrally coordinated In(III) centers, a structure akin to that seen in YCl_{3}. In contrast, GaCl_{3} crystallizes as dimers containing Ga_{2}Cl_{6}. Molten InCl_{3} conducts electricity, whereas AlCl_{3} does not as it converts to the molecular dimer, Al_{2}Cl_{6}.

The tetrahydrate, InCl_{3}·4H_{2}O, crystallises in the orthorhombic crystal system. It consists of a unit of [InCl_{3}(H_{2}O)_{2}] interconnected by two water of crystallizations. It is produced by the evaporation of a solution of indium(III) chloride.

== Reactions ==
InCl_{3} is a Lewis acid and forms complexes with donor ligands, L, InCl_{3}L, InCl_{3}L_{2}, InCl_{3}L_{3}. For example, with the chloride ion it forms tetrahedral [InCl_{4}]^{−}, trigonal bipyramidal [InCl_{5}]^{2−}, and octahedral [InCl_{6}]^{3−}.

In diethyl ether solution, InCl_{3} reacts with lithium hydride, LiH, to form lithium tetrahydroindate(III) Li[InH_{4}]. This unstable compound decomposes below 0 °C, and is reacted in situ in organic synthesis as a reducing agent and to prepare tertiary amine and phosphine complexes of InH_{3}.

Trimethylindium, InMe_{3}, can be produced by reacting InCl_{3} in diethyl ether solution either with the Grignard reagent methylmagnesium iodide CH_{3}MgI or methyllithium LiCH_{3}. Triethylindium can be prepared in a similar fashion but with the grignard reagent EtMgBr.

InCl_{3} + 3 LiMe → Me_{3}In·OEt_{2} + 3 LiCl
InCl_{3} + 3 MeMgI → Me_{3}In·OEt_{2} + 3 MgClI
InCl_{3} + 3 EtMgBr → Me_{3}In·OEt_{2} + 3 MgBr_{2}

InCl_{3} reacts with indium metal at high temperature to form the lower valent indium chlorides In_{5}Cl_{9}, In_{2}Cl_{3} and InCl.

== Catalyst in chemistry ==
Indium chloride is a Lewis acid catalyst in organic reactions such as Friedel-Crafts acylations and Diels-Alder reactions. As an example of the latter, the reaction proceeds at room temperature, with 1 mole% catalyst loading in an acetonitrile-water solvent mixture. The first step is a Knoevenagel condensation between the barbituric acid and the aldehyde; the second step is a reverse electron-demand Diels-Alder reaction, which is a multicomponent reaction of N,N'-dimethyl-barbituric acid, benzaldehyde and ethyl vinyl ether. With the catalyst, the reported chemical yield is 90% and the percentage trans isomer is 70%. Without the catalyst added, the yield drops to 65% with 50% trans product.

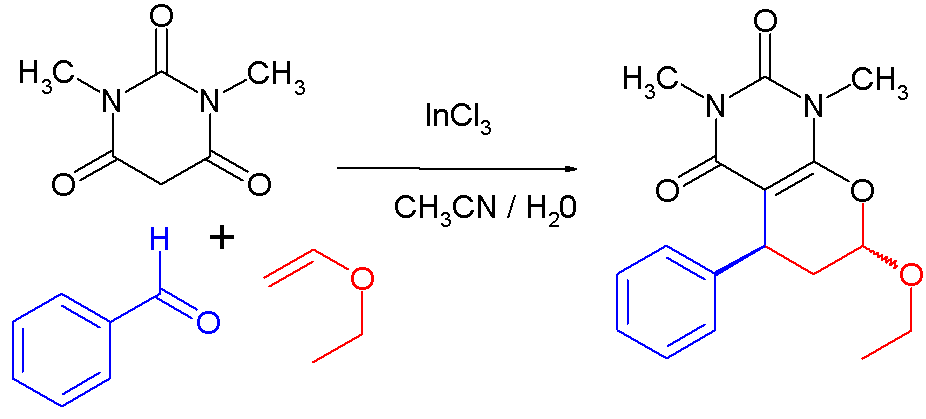
