= Carbometalation =

Chemical reaction with carbon-metal bond

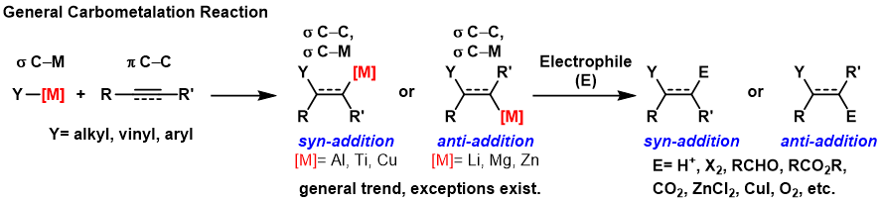

A carbometallation is any reaction where a carbon-metal bond reacts with a carbon-carbon π-bond to produce a new carbon-carbon σ-bond and a carbon-metal σ-bond. The resulting carbon-metal bond can undergo further carbometallation reactions (oligomerization or polymerization see Ziegler-Natta polymerization) or it can be reacted with a variety of electrophiles including halogenating reagents, carbonyls, oxygen, and inorganic salts to produce different organometallic reagents. Carbometallations can be performed on alkynes and alkenes to form products with high geometric purity or enantioselectivity, respectively. Some metals prefer to give the anti-addition product with high selectivity and some yield the syn-addition product. The outcome of syn and anti- addition products is determined by the mechanism of the carbometallation.

== Carboboration ==
Carboboration is one of the most versatile carbometallation reactions. See Carboboration.

== Carboalumination ==
The carboalumination reaction is most commonly catalyzed by zirconocene dichloride (or related catalyst). Some carboaluminations are performed with titanocene complexes. This reaction is sometimes referred to as the Zr- catalyzed asymmetric carboalumination of alkenes (ZACA) or the Zr-catalyzed methylalumination of alkynes (ZMA).

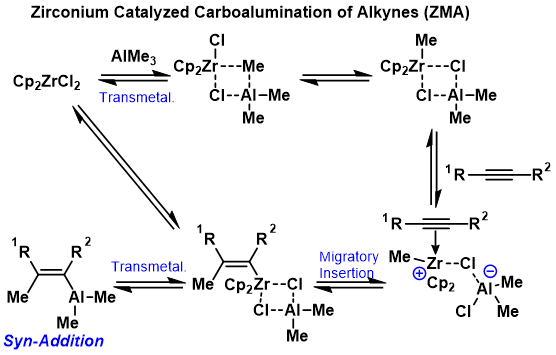

The most common trialkyl aluminium reagents for this transformation are trimethylaluminium, triethylaluminium, and sometimes triisobutylaluminium. When using trialkylaluminium reagents that have beta-hydrides, eliminations and hydroaluminium reactions become competing processes. The general mechanism of the ZMA reaction can be described as first the formation of the active catalytic species from the pre-catalyst zirconocene dichloride through its reaction with trimethyl aluminium. First transmetalation of a methyl from the aluminium to the zirconium occurs. Next, chloride abstraction by aluminium creates a cationic zirconium species that is closely associated with an anionic aluminium complex. This zirconium cation can coordinate an alkene or alkyne where migratory insertion of a methyl then takes place. The resultant vinyl or alkyl zirconium species can undergo a reversible, but stereoretentive transmetalation with an organoaluminium to provide the carboalumination product and regeneration of the zirconocene dichloride catalyst. This process generally provides the syn-addition product; however, conditions exist to provide the anti-addition product though a modified mechanism.

Trimethylsilyl (TMS) protected alkynes, trimethyl germanium alkynes, and terminal alkynes can produce anti-carboalumination products at room temperature or elevated temperatures if a coordinating group is nearby on the substrate. In these reactions, first syn-carboalumination takes place under the previously outlined mechanism. Then, another equivalent of aluminium that is coordinated to the directing group can displace the vinyl aluminium, inverting the geometry at the carbon where displacement takes place.

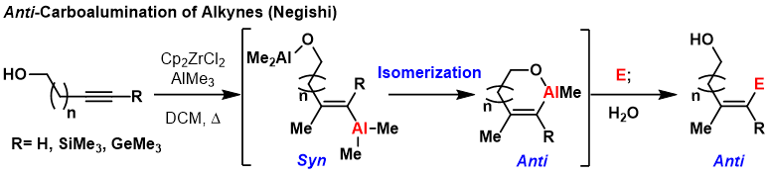
Anti-Carboalumination of Alkynes (Negishi)

This forms a thermodynamically favorable metallacycle to prevent subsequent inversions. Formally, this process provides anti-carboalumination products that can be quenched with electrophiles. A limitation of this methodology is that the directing group must be sufficiently close to the carbon-carbon π-bond to form a thermodynamically favorable ring or else mixtures of geometric isomers will form.

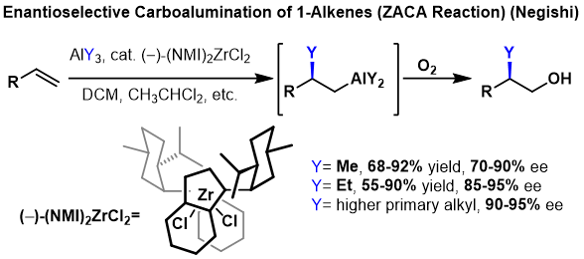
The Enantioselective Carboalumination of alkenes (ZACA Reaction) (Negishi)

The carboalumination of alkenes to form substituted alkanes can be rendered enantioselective if prochiral alkenes are used. In these reactions, a chiral indenyl zirconium catalyst is used to induce enantioselectivity. In these reactions, high enantioselectivities were obtained for several trialkyl aluminium reagents, however, the yield decreases dramatically with each additional carbon of the alkyl chain on the trialkyl aluminium reagent.

== Carbolithiation ==
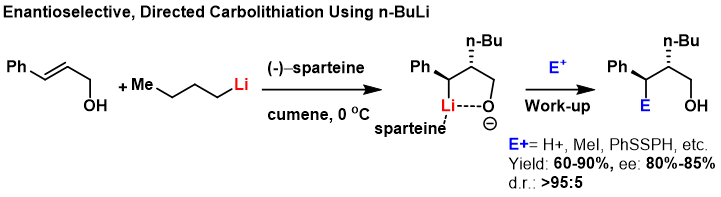

Carbolithiation is the addition of an organolithium reagent across a carbon-carbon pi-bond. The organolithium reagents used in this transformation can be commercial (such as n-butyllithium) or can be generated through deprotonation or lithium-halogen exchange. Both inter- and intramolecular examples of carbolithiation exist and can be used in synthesis to generate complexity. Organolithiums are highly reactive chemicals and often the resulting organolithium reagent generated from the carbolithiation can continue to react with electrophiles or remaining starting material (resulting in polymerization). This reaction has been rendered enantioselective through the use of sparteine, which can chelate the lithium ion and induce chirality. Today, this is not a common strategy due to a shortage of natural sparteine. However, recent advances in the synthesis of sparteine surrogates and their effective application in carbolithiation have reactivated interest in this strategy.

Another demonstration of this reaction type is an alternative route to tamoxifen starting from diphenylacetylene and ethyllithium: The capturing electrophile here is triisopropyl borate forming the boronic acid R–B(OH)_{2}. The second step completing tamoxifen is a Suzuki reaction.

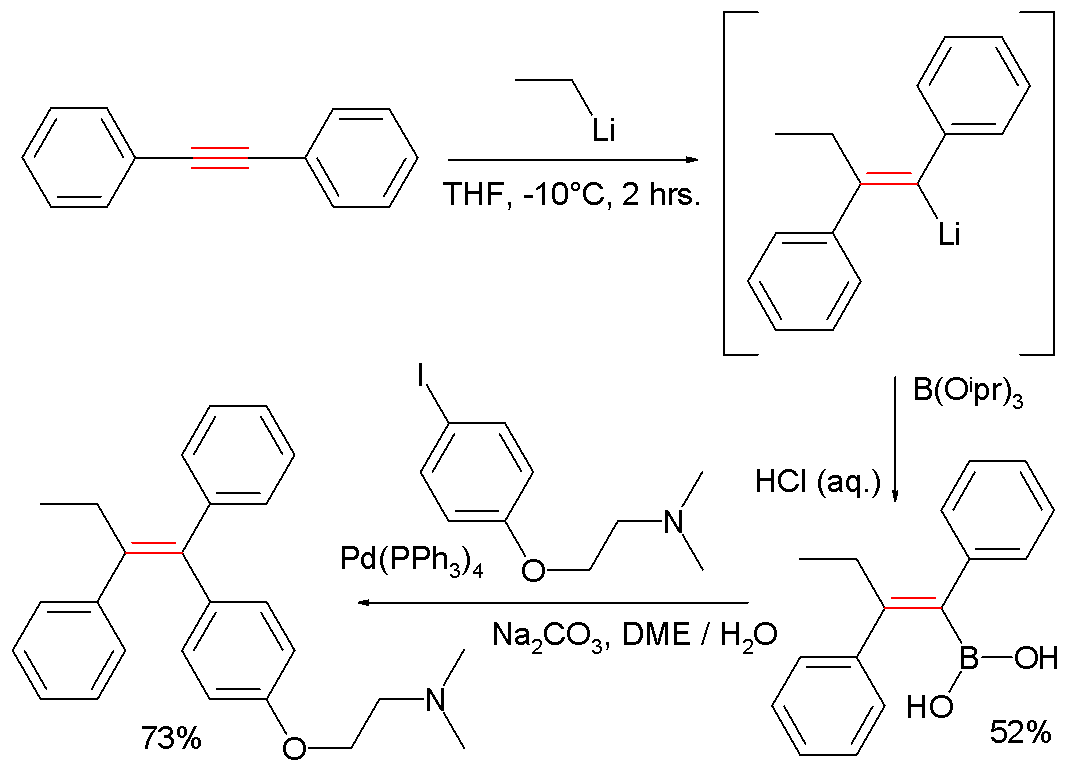
Tamoxifen carbometalation

As a consequence of the high reactivity of organolithiums as strong bases and strong nucleophiles, the substrate scope of the carbolithiation is generally limited to chemicals that do not contain acidic or electrophilic functional groups.

== Carbomagnesiation and carbozincation ==
Due to the decreased nucleophilicity of Grignard reagents (organomagnesium) and organozinc reagents, non-catalyzed carbomagnesiation and carbozincation reactions are typically only observed on activated or strained alkenes and alkynes. For example, electron withdrawing groups like esters, nitriles or sulfones must be in conjugation with the carbon-carbon π-system (see Michael reaction) or a directing group like an alcohol or amine must be nearby to direct the reaction. These reactions can be catalyzed by a variety of transition metals such as iron, copper, zirconium, nickel, cobalt and others.

Illustrative is the Fe-catalyzed reaction of methylphenylacetylene with phenylmagnesium bromide, which generates a vinyl magnesium intermediate. Hydrolysis affords the diphenylalkene:

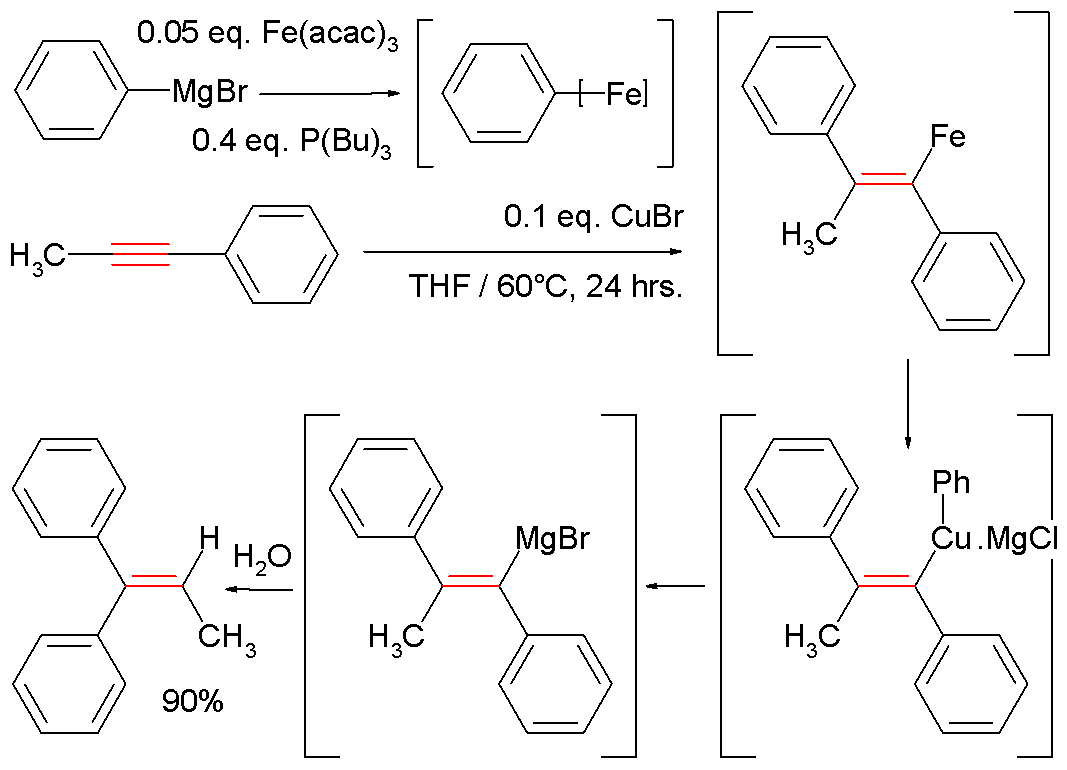
Arylmagnesiation

== Carbopalladation ==
Carbopalladations can be a description of the elementary step of a reaction catalyzed by a palladium catalyst (Mizoroki-Heck reaction) and can also refer to a carbometalation reaction with a palladium catalyst (alkene difunctionalization, hydrofunctionalization, or reductive Heck)
