= Chloroethane =

Chemical compound commonly known as ethyl chloride

Skeletal formula of chloroethane
Skeletal formula of chloroethane with stereo bonds
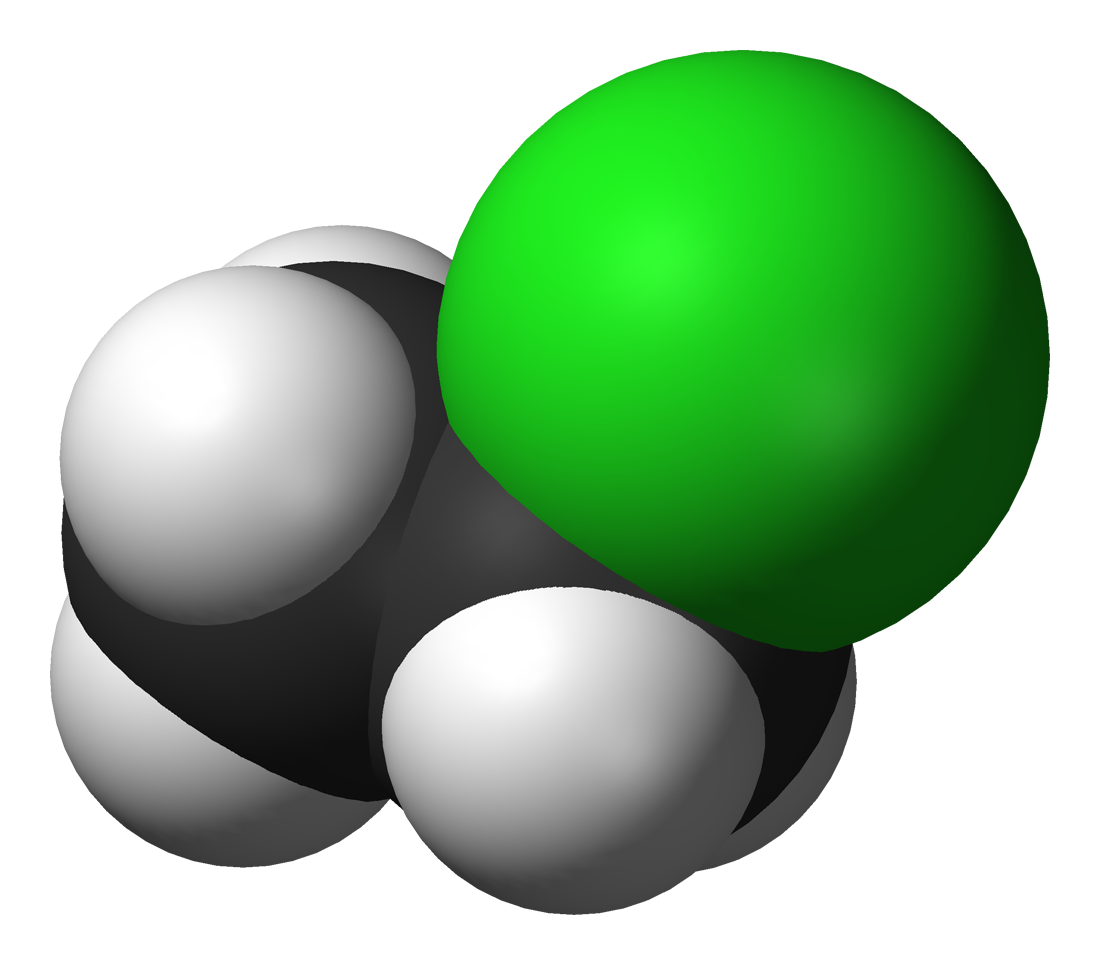
- Ball-and-stick model of chloroethane

Names
- Preferred IUPAC name Chloroethane
- Other names Ethyl chloride, Monochloroethane, Chlorene, Muriatic ether, UN 1037, Hydrochloric Ether, Chelen, Kelene

Identifiers
CAS Number	75-00-3
3D model (JSmol)	Interactive image
Abbreviations	EtCl
ChEBI	CHEBI:47554
ChEMBL	ChEMBL46058
ChemSpider	6097
ECHA InfoCard	100.000.755
KEGG	D04088
PubChem CID	6337
RTECS number	KH7525000
UNII	46U771ERWK
CompTox Dashboard (EPA)	DTXSID1020302
- InChI: InChI=1S/C2H5Cl/c1-2-3/h2H2,1H3 Key: HRYZWHHZPQKTII-UHFFFAOYSA-N; InChI=1/C2H5Cl/c1-2-3/h2H2,1H3 Key: HRYZWHHZPQKTII-UHFFFAOYAJ
- SMILES: ClCC

Properties
Chemical formula	C_{2}H_{5}Cl
Molar mass	64.51 g·mol^{−1}
Appearance	Colorless gas
Odor	Pungent, ethereal
Density	0.921 g/cm^{3} (0-4 °C); 0.8898 g/cm^{3} (25 °C)
Melting point	−138.7 °C (−217.7 °F; 134.5 K)
Boiling point	12.27 °C (54.09 °F; 285.42 K) decomposes at 510 °C
Solubility in water	0.447 g/100 mL (0 °C); 0.574 g/100 mL (20 °C)
Solubility	Soluble in alcohol, ether
Solubility in ethanol	48.3 g/100 g (21 °C)
Vapor pressure	8.4 kPa (-40 °C); 62.3 kPa (0 °C); 134.6 kPa (20 °C)
Henry's law constant (k_{H})	11.1 L·atm/mol (24 °C)
Refractive index (n_{D})	1.3676 (20 °C); 1.001 (25 °C)
Viscosity	0.279 cP (10 °C)

Structure
Dipole moment	2.06 D

Thermochemistry
Heat capacity (C)	104.3 J/mol·K
Std molar entropy (S^{⦵}_{298})	275.7 J/mol·K
Std enthalpy of formation (Δ_{f}H^{⦵}_{298})	−137 kJ/mol
Gibbs free energy (Δ_{f}G^{⦵})	−59.3 kJ/mol

Pharmacology
ATC code	N01BX01 (WHO)

Hazards
- Occupational safety and health (OHS/OSH)
Main hazards	Flammable
- GHS labelling
Pictograms	(GHS02: Flammable) (GHS08: Health hazard)
Signal word	Danger
Hazard statements	H220, H351, H412
Precautionary statements	P210, P273, P281, P410+P403
NFPA 704 (fire diamond)	2 4 2
Flash point	−43 °C (−45 °F; 230 K) open cup −50 °C (−58 °F; 223 K) closed cup
Autoignition temperature	494 to 519 °C (921 to 966 °F; 767 to 792 K)
Explosive limits	3.8%-15.4%
- Lethal dose or concentration (LD, LC)
LC_{50} (median concentration)	59,701 ppm (rat, 2 hr); 54,478 ppm (mouse, 2 hr)
LC_{Lo} (lowest published)	40,000 ppm (guinea pig, 45 min)
- NIOSH (US health exposure limits)
PEL (Permissible)	TWA 1000 ppm (2600 mg/m^{3})
REL (Recommended)	Handle with caution in the workplace.
IDLH (Immediate danger)	3800 ppm
Legal status	BR: Class B1 (Psychoactive drugs)

Related compounds
Related haloalkanes	1,1-dichloroethane 1,2-dichloroethane 1,1,1-trichloroethane 1,1,2-trichloroethane bromoethane chloromethane
- Except where otherwise noted, data are given for materials in their standard state (at 25 °C [77 °F], 100 kPa). verify (what is ?) Infobox references

Chloroethane, commonly known as ethyl chloride, is a chemical compound with chemical formula C_{2}H_{5}Cl or CH_{3}CH_{2}Cl, once widely used in producing tetraethyllead, a gasoline additive. It is a colorless, flammable gas or refrigerated liquid with a faintly sweet odor.

Ethyl chloride was first synthesized by Basil Valentine by reacting ethanol and hydrochloric acid in 1440. Glauber made it in 1648 by reacting ethanol and zinc chloride.

== Production ==
Chloroethane is produced by hydrochlorination of ethylene:

C_{2}H_{4} + HCl → C_{2}H_{5}Cl

At various times in the past, chloroethane has also been produced from ethanol and hydrochloric acid, from ethane and chlorine, or from ethanol and phosphorus trichloride, but these routes are no longer economical. Some chloroethane is generated as a byproduct of polyvinyl chloride production.

== Uses ==
Chloroethane is an inexpensive ethylating agent. It reacts with aluminium metal to give ethylaluminium sesquichloride, a precursor to polymers and other useful organoaluminium compounds. Chloroethane is used to convert cellulose to ethylcellulose, a thickening agent and binder in paints, cosmetics, and similar products.

Like other chlorinated hydrocarbons, chloroethane has been used as a refrigerant, an aerosol spray propellant, an anesthetic, and a blowing agent for foam packaging. For a time it was used as a promoter chemical in the aluminium chloride catalyzed process to produce ethylbenzene, the precursor for styrene monomer. At present though, it is not widely used in any of these roles.

=== Obsolete uses ===
Beginning in 1922 and continuing through most of the 20th century, the major use of chloroethane was to produce tetraethyllead (TEL), an anti-knock additive for gasoline. TEL has been or is being phased out in most of the industrialized world, and the demand for chloroethane has fallen sharply.

=== Niche uses ===
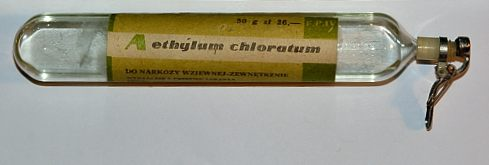
Bottle of compressed EtCl for anaesthesia

Chloroethane has a low boiling point, so when applied topically, the heat absorbed by the boiling liquid produces a deep and rapid chill. When sprayed on the skin, this chill has a mild anesthetic effect, which can be useful when removing splinters or incising abscesses in a clinical setting. Chloroethane was standard equipment in casualty wards. It was commonly used to induce general anaesthesia before continuing with diethyl ether, which has a much slower uptake. In dentistry, chloroethane is used as one of the means of diagnosing a 'dead tooth', i.e., one in which the pulp has died. A small amount of the substance is placed on the suspect tooth using a cotton wad; if the tooth is still alive this should be sensed by the patient as mild discomfort that subsides when the wad is removed.

Chloroethane is used to wind the Atmos clock (manufactured by Jaeger-LeCoultre). The clock gets the energy it needs to wind the mainspring from temperature changes in the environment and does not need to be wound manually. The mainspring is wound by the expansion and contraction of liquid and gaseous ethyl chloride in an internal hermetically sealed metal bellows.

=== Recreational drug ===
Chloroethane is a recreational inhalant drug, although it should not be confused with a duster or canned air, which is composed of fluorinated low-weight hydrocarbons such as tetrafluoromethane, chlorodifluoromethane or another similar gas.

In Brazil, it is a major component of a traditional (though illegal) drug taken during Carnaval, known locally as "lança-perfume" (lit. perfume launcher or sprayer).

Abuse of chloroethane by inhaling the substance from commercial products (e.g., muscle sprays, cleaning solvents) has been reported intermittently. Cerebellar dysfunction is a common clinical feature of toxicity, but brain imaging studies are often unremarkable. Abusers can develop cardiac arrhythmias, some of which can be fatal.

== Safety ==
The vapor is flammable and narcotic, which requires care.

Monochloroethane is the least toxic of the chloroethanes. Like other chlorinated hydrocarbons, it is a central nervous system depressant, albeit a less potent one than many similar compounds. People breathing its vapors at less than 1% concentration in air usually experience no symptoms. At concentrations of 3% to 5%, victims usually exhibit symptoms similar to those of alcohol intoxication. Breathing its vapors at >15% concentration is often fatal; most commercially available handheld containers contain 30% per volume of concentrated vapors that naturally disperse in the outside air.

If exposed to concentrations higher than 6% to 8% victims often exhibit shallow breathing, loss of consciousnesses, and depressed heart-rate. They can be roused with physical contact or loud noise. At this point removal from the area of exposure is advised to restore consciousness. The long-term effects of exposure over a period of 4 or more hours will cause side effects similar to alcoholic hang-over with dehydration, dizziness, loss of clear vision and temporary loss of consciousness, which can last an hour or more. If no longer exposed to the gas, a victim will return to normal health quickly. This can be helped with intake of extra fluids, vitamins, and sugars.

Toxic over-exposure starts at 9% to 12% concentrations, the heart rate drops further, the victim may have more shallow breathing or stop all together, they do not respond to any outside stimulation and may begin to involuntarily gasp, belch or vomit, which can lead to aspiration if the victim is not turned on their side. This constitutes a medical emergency and requires prompt action. It is advised to move the victim to clear air and administer forced breathing for them to purge the lungs of the toxic fumes. If the victim recovers quickly enough, hospitalization may not be required, but will require a medical examination to ensure that no organ damage has occurred.

At >12% concentration, the victim's heart, lungs and kidneys begin to fail. Immediate CPR followed by medical support measures may be required to prevent fatal kidney, lung and heart failure. Singer Darius Campbell Danesh died of "toxic effects of chloroethane" as well as suffocation.

Studies on the effects of chronic ethyl chloride exposure in animals have given inconsistent results, and no data exists for its long-term effects on humans.

While chloroethane is not classified as carcinogenic to humans specifically, it is still used in medicine as a local anesthetic.
