= Diethylaluminium chloride =

Names
- IUPAC name Chlorodiethylalumane
- Other names Chlorodiethylaluminium

Identifiers
CAS Number	96-10-6
3D model (JSmol)	Interactive image
Beilstein Reference	4123259
ChemSpider	10413126
ECHA InfoCard	100.002.253
EC Number	202-477-2
PubChem CID	7277
RTECS number	BD0558000
UNII	9J9260380K
UN number	3394
CompTox Dashboard (EPA)	DTXSID5026592
- InChI: InChI=1S/2C2H5.Al.ClH/c2*1-2;;/h2*1H2,2H3;;1H/q;;+1;/p-1 Key: YNLAOSYQHBDIKW-UHFFFAOYSA-M
- SMILES: CC[Al](Cl)CC

Properties
Chemical formula	C_{8}H_{20}Al_{2}Cl_{2}
Molar mass	241.11 g·mol^{−1}
Appearance	Colorless liquid
Density	0.96 g/cm^{3}
Melting point	−74 °C (−101 °F; 199 K)
Boiling point	125 to 126 °C (257 to 259 °F; 398 to 399 K) at 50 mmHg
Solubility in water	Reacts
Vapor pressure	3 mmHg (at 60 °C)

Hazards
- GHS labelling
Pictograms	(GHS02: Flammable) (GHS05: Corrosive)
Signal word	Danger
Hazard statements	H225, H250, H260, H261, H314
Precautionary statements	P210, P222, P223, P231+P232, P233, P240, P241, P242, P243, P260, P264, P280, P301+P330+P331, P302+P334, P303+P361+P353, P304+P340, P305+P351+P338, P310, P321, P335+P334, P363, P370+P378, P402+P404, P403+P235, P405, P422, P501
NFPA 704 (fire diamond)	3 4 2 W
Flash point	−18 °C (0 °F; 255 K)
- Except where otherwise noted, data are given for materials in their standard state (at 25 °C [77 °F], 100 kPa). Infobox references

Diethylaluminium chloride, abbreviated DEAC, is an organoaluminium compound. Although often given the chemical formula (C_{2}H_{5})_{2}AlCl, it exists as a dimer, [(C_{2}H_{5})_{2}AlCl]_{2} It is a precursor to Ziegler–Natta catalysts employed for the production of polyolefins. The compound is also a Lewis acid, useful in organic synthesis. The compound is a colorless waxy solid, but is usually handled as a solution in hydrocarbon solvents. It is highly reactive, even pyrophoric.

== Structure and bonding ==
Compounds of the empirical formula AlR_{2}Cl (R = alkyl, aryl) usually exist as dimers with the formula (R_{2}Al)_{2}(μ-Cl)_{2}. The bridging ligands (indicated by "μ-") are halides, not the organic substituents. The aluminium adopts a tetrahedral geometry. Each Al(III) center follows the octet rule. In contrast, triethylaluminium and trimethylaluminium feature bridging alkyl groups and these compounds violate the octet rule.

== Production ==
Diethylaluminium chloride can be produced from ethylaluminium sesquichloride, (C_{2}H_{5})_{3}Al_{2}Cl_{3}, by reduction with sodium:

2 (C_{2}H_{5})_{3}Al_{2}Cl_{3} + 3 Na → 3 (C_{2}H_{5})_{2}AlCl + Al + 3 NaCl

It is also obtained from the reaction of triethylaluminium with hydrochloric acid:

(C_{2}H_{5})_{3}Al + HCl → (C_{2}H_{5})_{2}AlCl + C_{2}H_{6}

Reproportionation reactions can also be used:

2 (C_{2}H_{5})_{3}Al + AlCl_{3} → 3 (C_{2}H_{5})_{2}AlCl
(C_{2}H_{5})_{3}Al_{2}Cl_{3} + (C_{2}H_{5})_{3}Al → 3 (C_{2}H_{5})_{2}AlCl

== Uses ==
Diethylaluminium chloride and other organoaluminium compounds are used in combination with transition metal compounds as Ziegler–Natta catalysts for the polymerization of various alkenes.

As a Lewis acid, diethylaluminium chloride also has uses in organic synthesis. For example, it is used to catalyze the Diels–Alder and ene reactions. Alternatively, it can react as a nucleophile or a proton scavenger.

== Safety ==
Diethylaluminium chloride is not only flammable but pyrophoric.
