= ZACA reaction =

Reaction type	transition metal catalyzed organometallic functionalization

Reaction
alkene
+
organoaluminum compound
+
chiral zirconium catalyst
+
oxygen (optional)
↓
chiral alcohol
+
aluminum oxide

Conditions
Typical solvents	typically DCM

The zirconium-catalyzed asymmetric carbo-alumination reaction (or ZACA reaction) was developed by Nobel laureate Ei-ichi Negishi. It facilitates the chiral functionalization of alkenes using organoaluminium compounds under the influence of chiral bis-indenylzirconium catalysts (e.g. bearing chiral terpene residues, as in (+)- or (−)-bis[(1-neomenthyl)indenyl]zirconium dichloride). In a first step the alkene inserts into an Al-C bond of the reagent, forming a new chiral organoaluminium compound in which the aluminium atom occupies the lesser hindered position. This intermediate is usually oxidized by oxygen to form the corresponding chiral alcohol (cf. hydroboration–oxidation reaction). The reaction can also be applied to dienes, where the least sterically hindered double bond is attacked selectively.

== See also ==
- Organoaluminium chemistry
- Organozirconium chemistry
- Indenyl effect
