= Ethylaluminium sesquichloride =

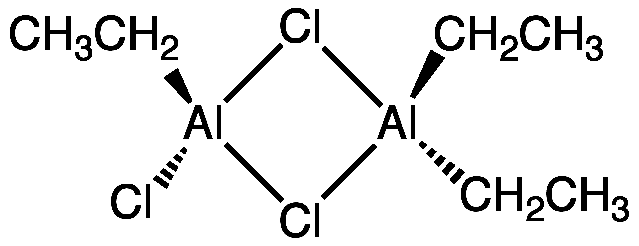

Names
- IUPAC name Chloro(diethyl)alumane; dichloro(ethyl)alumane(1)
- Other names Ethylaluminum sesquichloride (EASC)

Identifiers
CAS Number	12075-68-2
3D model (JSmol)	(separate): Interactive image; (together): Interactive image
ChemSpider	21171404
ECHA InfoCard	100.031.931
EC Number	235-137-7
PubChem CID	25508
UN number	3052
CompTox Dashboard (EPA)	DTXSID4027737
- InChI: InChI=1S/3C2H5.2Al.3ClH/c3*1-2;;;;;/h3*1H2,2H3;;;3*1H/q;;;+1;+2;;;/p-3 Key: LDXMUMPEDOQULK-UHFFFAOYSA-K
- SMILES: (separate): CC[Al](CC)Cl.CC[Al](Cl)Cl; (together): CC[Al-]1(Cl)[Cl+][Al-]([Cl+]1)(CC)CC

Properties
Chemical formula	(C_{2}H_{5})_{2}AlCl•Cl_{2}AlC_{2}H_{5}
Molar mass	247.51 g/mol
Appearance	Clear to yellow liquid
Density	1.092 g/cm^{3}
Melting point	−50 °C (−58 °F; 223 K)
Boiling point	204 °C (399 °F; 477 K)

Hazards
- GHS labelling
Pictograms	(GHS02: Flammable) (GHS05: Corrosive)
Signal word	Danger
Hazard statements	H225, H250, H260, H314
Precautionary statements	P210, P222, P223, P231+P232, P233, P240, P241, P242, P243, P260, P264, P280, P301+P330+P331, P302+P334, P303+P361+P353, P304+P340, P305+P351+P338, P310, P321, P335+P334, P363, P370+P378, P402+P404, P403+P235, P405, P422, P501
Flash point	−20 °C (−4 °F; 253 K)
- Except where otherwise noted, data are given for materials in their standard state (at 25 °C [77 °F], 100 kPa). verify (what is ?) Infobox references

Ethylaluminium sesquichloride, also called EASC, is an industrially important organoaluminium compound used primarily as a precursor to triethylaluminium and as a catalyst component in Ziegler–Natta type systems for olefin and diene polymerizations. Other applications include use in alkylation reactions and as a catalyst component in linear oligomerization and cyclization of unsaturated hydrocarbons. EASC is a colourless liquid, spontaneously combustible in air and reacts violently when in contact with water and many other compounds.

== Production ==
Methyl, ethyl, and other alkyl or aralkyl halides that are not dehydrohalogenated readily can react with aluminium in an exothermic process to form organoaluminium sesquihalides in high yields. An important example is the reaction of ethyl chloride with aluminium to form ethylaluminium sesquichloride.

3 C_{2}H_{5}Cl + 2 Al → (C_{2}H_{5})_{3}Al_{2}Cl_{3}

The reaction is carried out with aluminium in the form of turnings, shavings, granules, or powder. Oxygen and moisture must be rigorously excluded. The reaction can be initiated with a small amount of mercury or iodine. It also can be started by treating the aluminium with an alkylaluminium halide.

The products are equilibrium mixtures of the codimer (R_{2}AlX • RAlX_{2}) and homodimers [(R_{2}AlX)_{2} and (RAlX_{2})_{2}], in which the two aluminium atoms of each component are halogen-bridged.

When byproduct reactions take place to a significant extent, the excess Al – Cl content in the R_{3}Al_{2}Cl_{3} product can be decreased by addition of the calculated amount of triethylaluminium. Overall, however, it is critical to control reaction conditions as slight excursions can result in catastrophic events.

== Reactions ==
=== Conversion to trialkylaluminium compounds ===
The alkylaluminium sesquihalides convert to dialkylaluminium halide or trialkylaluminium materials upon treatment with active metals, such as sodium or magnesium. For example, diethylaluminium chloride or triethylaluminium can be produced from ethylaluminium sesquichloride by sodium reduction:

2 (C_{2}H_{5})_{3}Al_{2}Cl_{3} + 3 Na → 3 (C_{2}H_{5})_{2}AlCl + Al + 3 NaCl

3 (C_{2}H_{5})_{2}AlCl + 3 Na → 2 (C_{2}H_{5})_{3}Al + Al + 3 NaCl

A magnesium-aluminium alloy can provide the reduction function simultaneously with reaction between aluminium and the alkyl halide:

4 C_{2}H_{5}Cl + Al_{2}Mg → 2 (C_{2}H_{5})_{2}AlCl + MgCl_{2}

The sesquichloride reduction process is currently the most economical route available for production of trimethylaluminium. Trialkylaluminium products made by this process generally contain trace levels of residual chloride but do not contain aluminium hydrides other low-level components found in the aluminium-hydrogen-olefin processes.

=== Reaction of acids with trialkylaluminiums to produce alkylaluminium chlorides ===
Diethylaluminium chloride (DEAC), ethylaluminium sesquichloride (EASC), and ethylaluminium dichloride (EADC) can all be prepared by the reaction of triethylaluminium with HCl (where n = 1,1.5 or 2):

(C_{2}H_{5})_{3}Al_{3} + n HCl → (C_{2}H_{5})_{3−n}AlCl_{n} + n C_{2}H_{6}

The products and their derivatives are used as components of catalysts for the production of polyolefins and some elastomers.
