= Carboboration =

Organic chemistry reaction

In organic chemistry, carboboration is an addition of both a carbon and a boron moiety to certain carbon-containing double and triple bonds, such as alkenes, alkynes, and allenes.

In the synthesis of organic compounds, this chemical reaction is used to install a new carbon-carbon bond and carbon-boron bond. The product of carboboration reactions are organoborane compounds which prove to be useful in organic synthesis, containing both a new carbon group and a boron handle for further functionalization. This carbon-boron bond allows for organoboron chemistry, which facilitates a wide variety of chemical transformations such as oxidation and the Suzuki Reaction. The carbon-boron bond can be transformed into a variety of functional groups and moieties, making it highly useful in pharmaceutical chemistry and organic synthesis.

Carboboration was developed soon after the advent and widespread use of hydroboration. Carboboration is often facilitated via catalysis, often employing transition metals, and usually involves an activated alkene or alkyne. The two most well-documented categories of carboboration are 1,1 and 1,2 carboboration, which differ in the regioselectivity of the incoming carbon group.

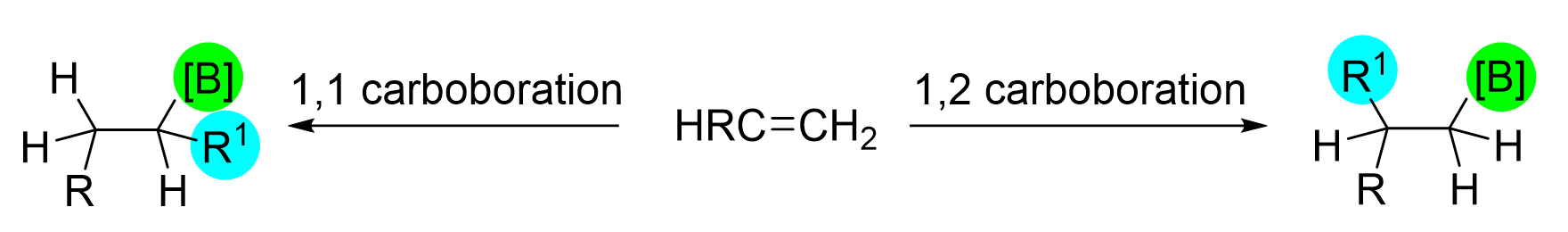
Examples of 1,1 and 1,2 carboboration on an alkene.

== 1,1 Carboboration ==
1,1 carboboration delivers both the carbon-carbon bond and the carbon-boron bond to the same carbon in the substrate. It requires a 1,2-migration of a substituent from one carbon to the other in the double bond. The Wrackmeyer reaction is typically credited as being the pioneering example of 1,1 carboboration and utilizes a metal migrating group to help facilitate the transformation. However, there are several modern examples of carboboration with a variety of migrating groups.

The Wrackmeyer reaction involves 1,1 carboboration of a 1-alkynylmetal compound to yield alkenylborane compounds. [M] can be silicon, germanium, tin, or lead compounds with various substituents or ligands. [M] and BR_{2} are typically cis to one another in the Wrackmeyer reaction, with some exceptions.

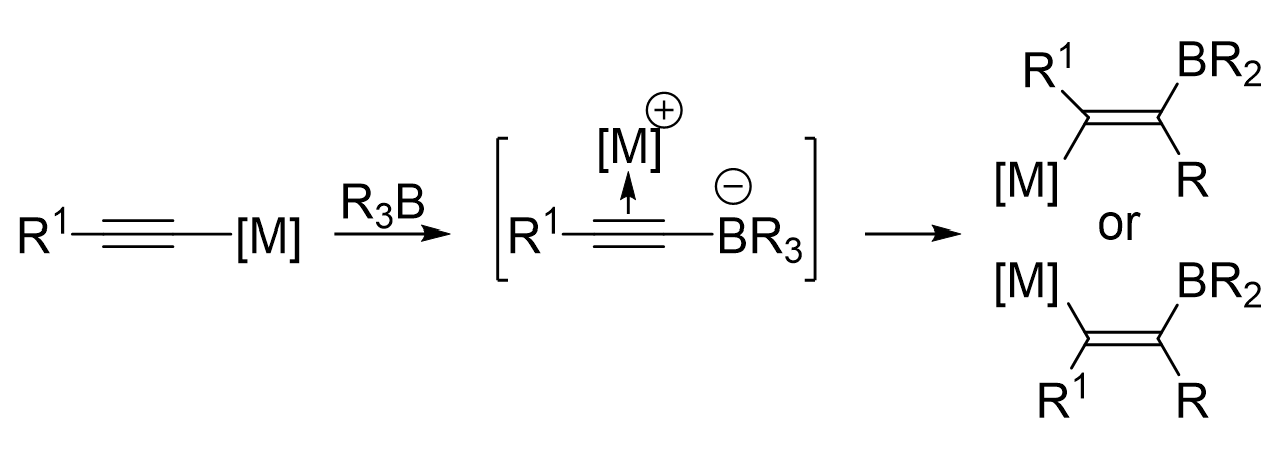
Wrackmeyer reaction involves 1,1 carboboration of a 1-alkynylmetal compound to yield alkenylborane compounds.

=== Mechanism ===
Wrackmeyer-type 1,1 carboboration is proposed to go through a zwitterionic intermediate, and this intermediate has been isolated and characterized in some cases. However, the mechanism can be highly substrate and reagent dependent.

In a borane, the compound typically adopts a trigonal planar molecular geometry, making the boron atom an electrophilic center. The substituents can affect the strength of the borane as a Lewis acid. Boranes which are stronger Lewis acids are better electrophiles and therefore better able to facilitate carboboration. Boranes can be optimized to work on less activated substrates. Tris(pentafluorophenyl)borane [B(C_{6}F_{5})_{3}] is a strongly Lewis acidic borane which functions well in 1,1 carboborations with both activated and unactivated substrates, and it allows for the reaction to be facilitated with more mild conditions. An activated substrate such as an alkene or alkyne has an electron-withdrawing group directly attached to a carbon within the double or triple bond. Transition metal catalysts have been utilized to develop enantioselective 1,1 carboborations on unactivated alkenes. These reactions go through a catalytic cycle which may or may not go through a zwitterionic intermediate.

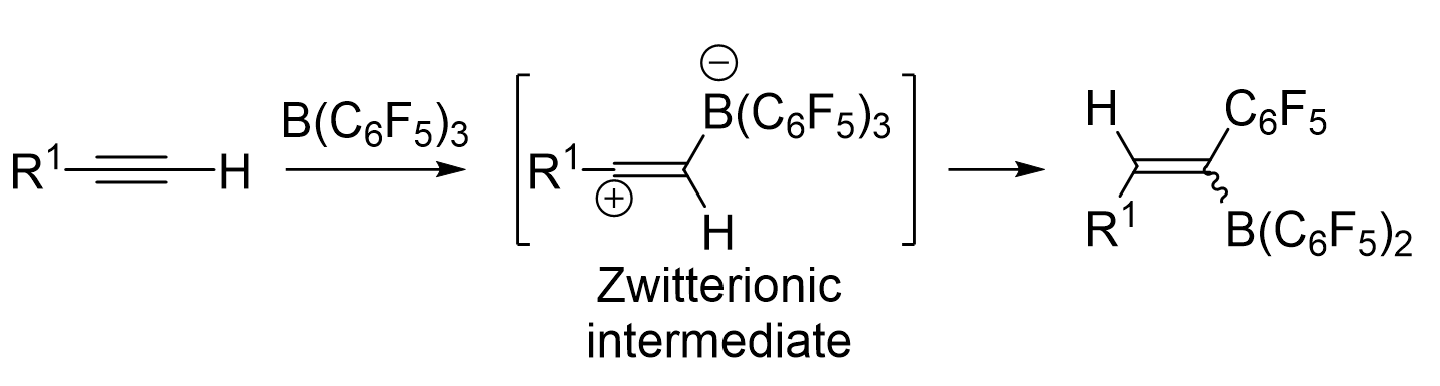
Proposed mechanism for Wrackmeyer-type 1,1 carboboration. The Zwitterionic intermediate has been isolated and characterized to support this proposal.

=== Examples ===
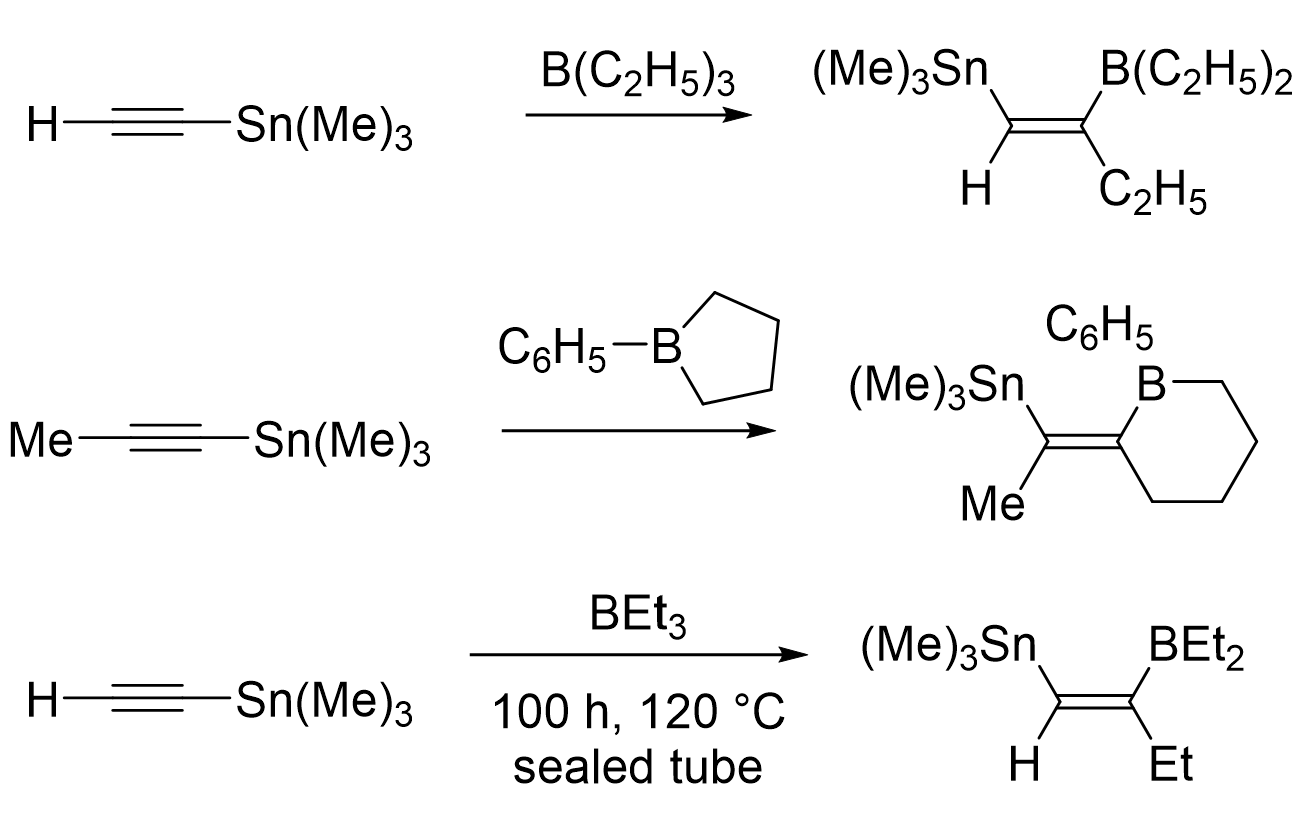
Examples of Wrackmeyer reaction.

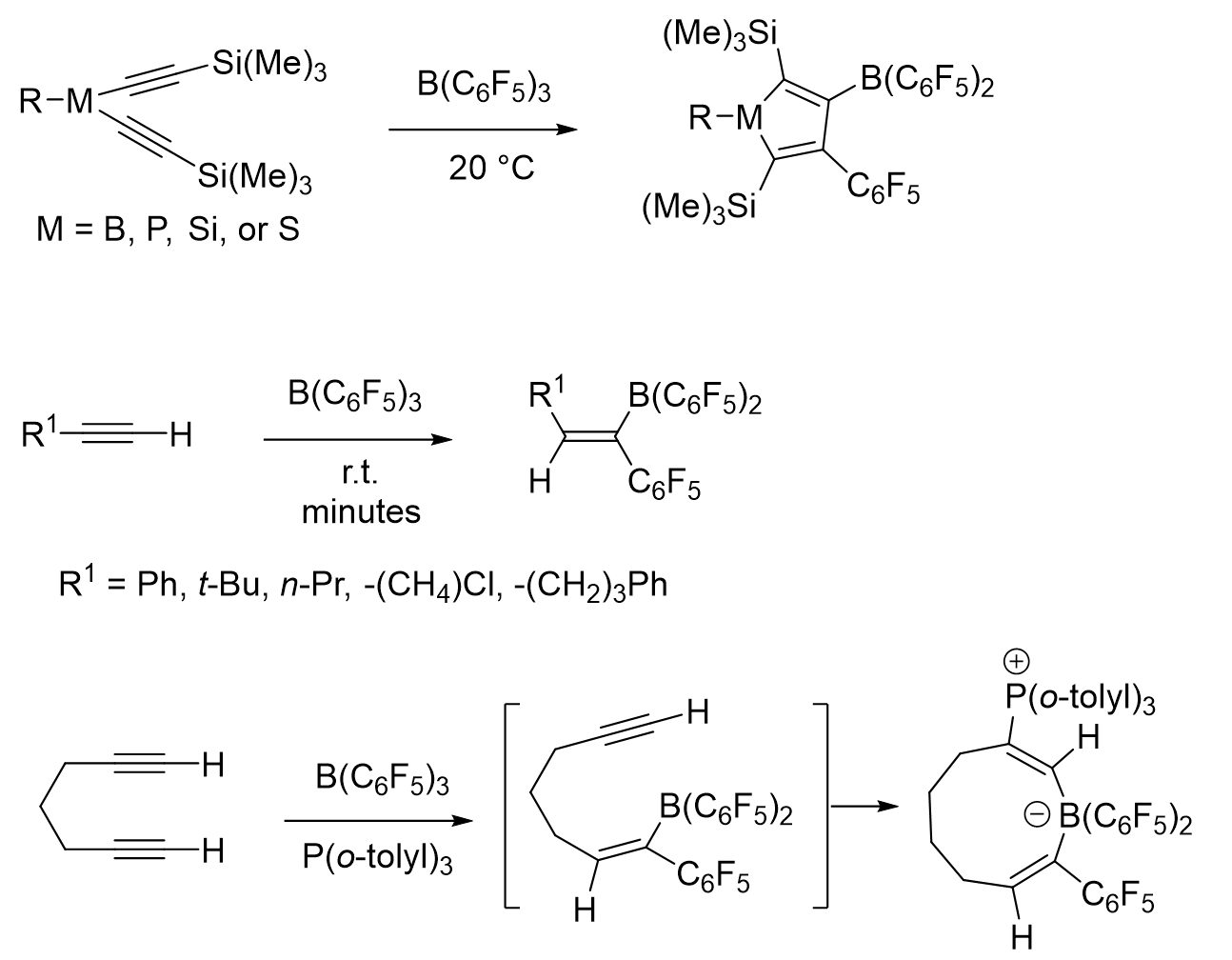
Modern Wrackmeyer reaction examples.

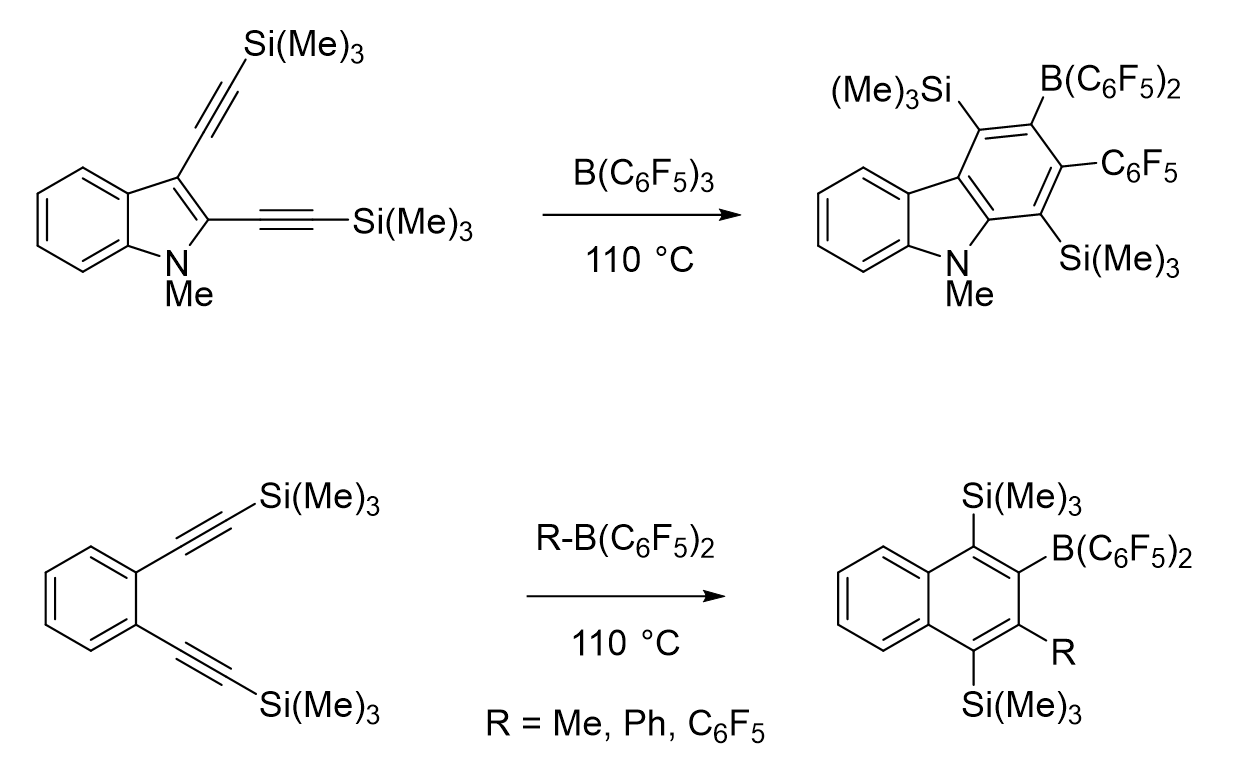
Intramolecular 1,1 carboboration example.

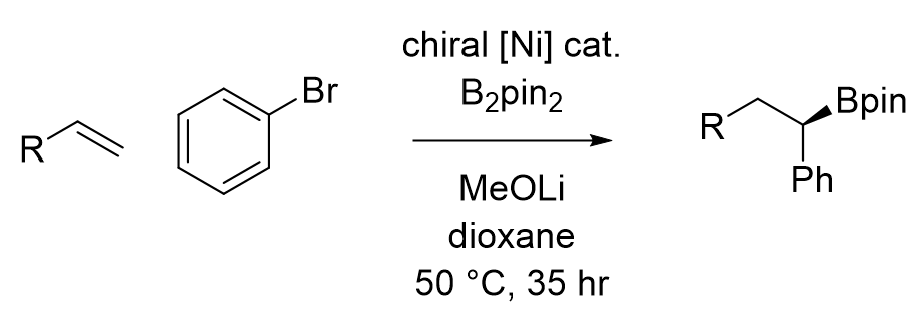
Enantioselective 1,1 carboboration example.

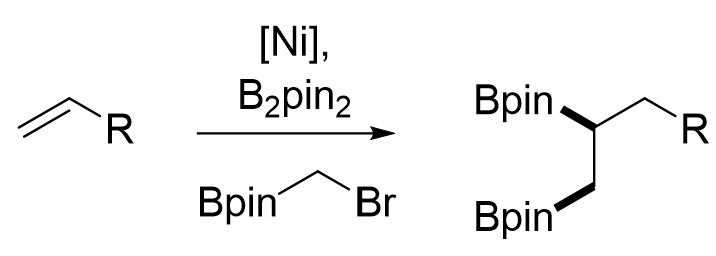
Ni catalyzed 1,1 bisborylation.

== 1,2 Carboboration ==
1,2 carboboration delivers the carbon-carbon bond and the carbon-boron bond to adjacent carbons in the substrate. It is typically facilitated by transition metal catalysis, but transition-metal-free 1,2 carboborations have been developed and continue to be of interest to synthetic chemists. The benefit of utilizing transition metals is that the reactions can often have enantioselective control based on the ligands used on the metal complex. Common metals used are palladium, nickel, and copper, which are often coupled with an organoborane or a boron source with an electrophile or nucleophile.

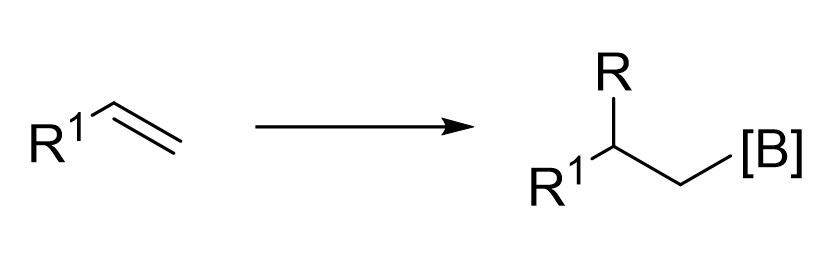
A general 1,2 carboboration transformation. This transformation is usually facilitated by a metal catalyst paired with either an organoborane or a boron source and an electrophile.

=== Mechanism ===
The mechanism of carboboration depends highly on the substrate and reagents utilized in the reaction. Shown below are examples of two types of Pd-catalyzed alkene 1,2 carboborations, Heck-type and the Wacker-type. However, the Cu- and Ni-catalyzed reactions can proceed through similar mechanisms. These two mechanisms mainly differ in the oxidation state of the active catalyst and how the carbon group is delivered to the substrate: whether the C–C bond is formed via migratory insertion from the catalyst (inner sphere) or attack by an external nucleophile (outer sphere). Wacker-type carboborations, catalyzed by Pd^{II}, are much rarer than Heck-type. The first example of a Wacker-type 1,2 carboboration was reported by the Engle group in 2019.

Despite the common trend of utilizing transition metals, transition metal-free processes have also been developed, such as utilizing boronic acids or light-mediated radical initiation. These reactions usually lead to the boron substituent being at the terminus or less substituted side of the substrate, but anti-carborborations have also been developed which produce reverse regioselectivity. Much work has also been done to render 1,2 carboboration enantioselective using various ligands on transition metal catalysts.

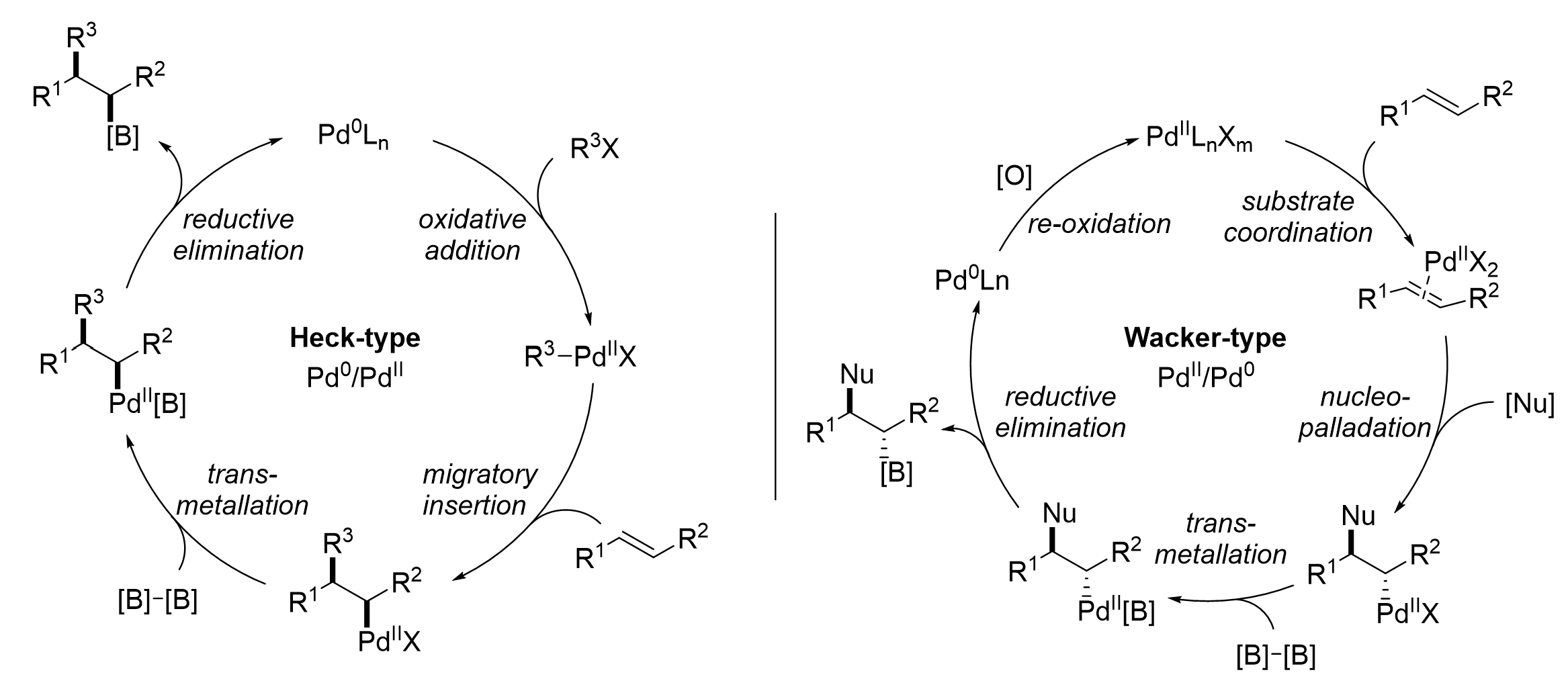
Wacker and Heck-type Pd catalyzed 1,2 carboboration mechanism.

=== Examples ===
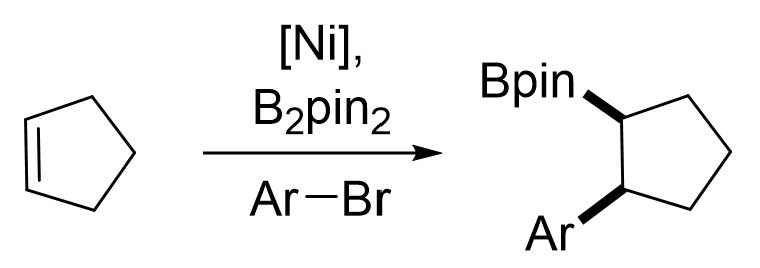
Ni catalyzed 1,2 carboboration.

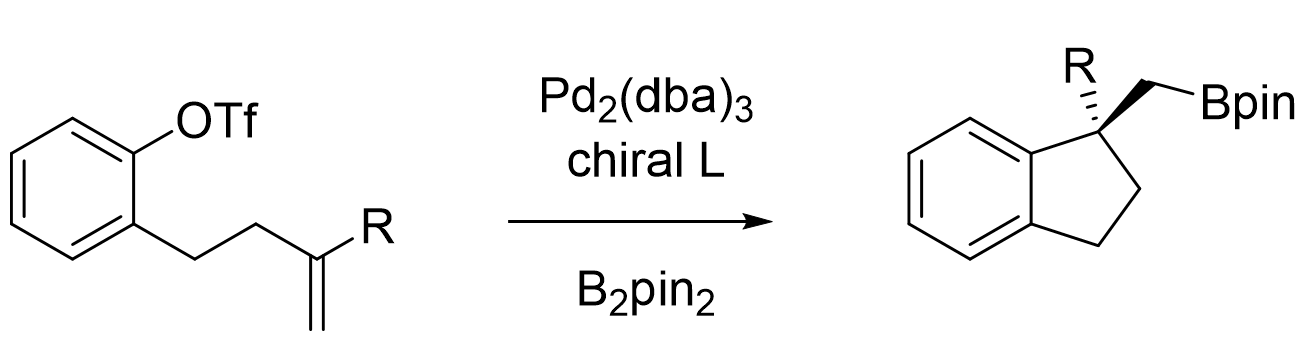
1,2 intramolecular carboboration, made enantioselective with chiral ligand.

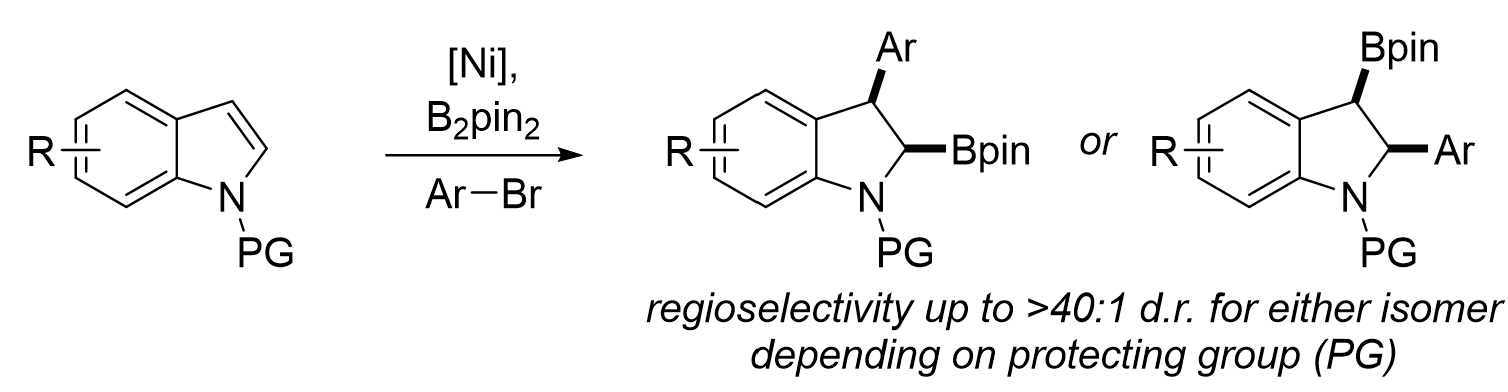
Regioselective, PG dependent 1,2 carboboration.

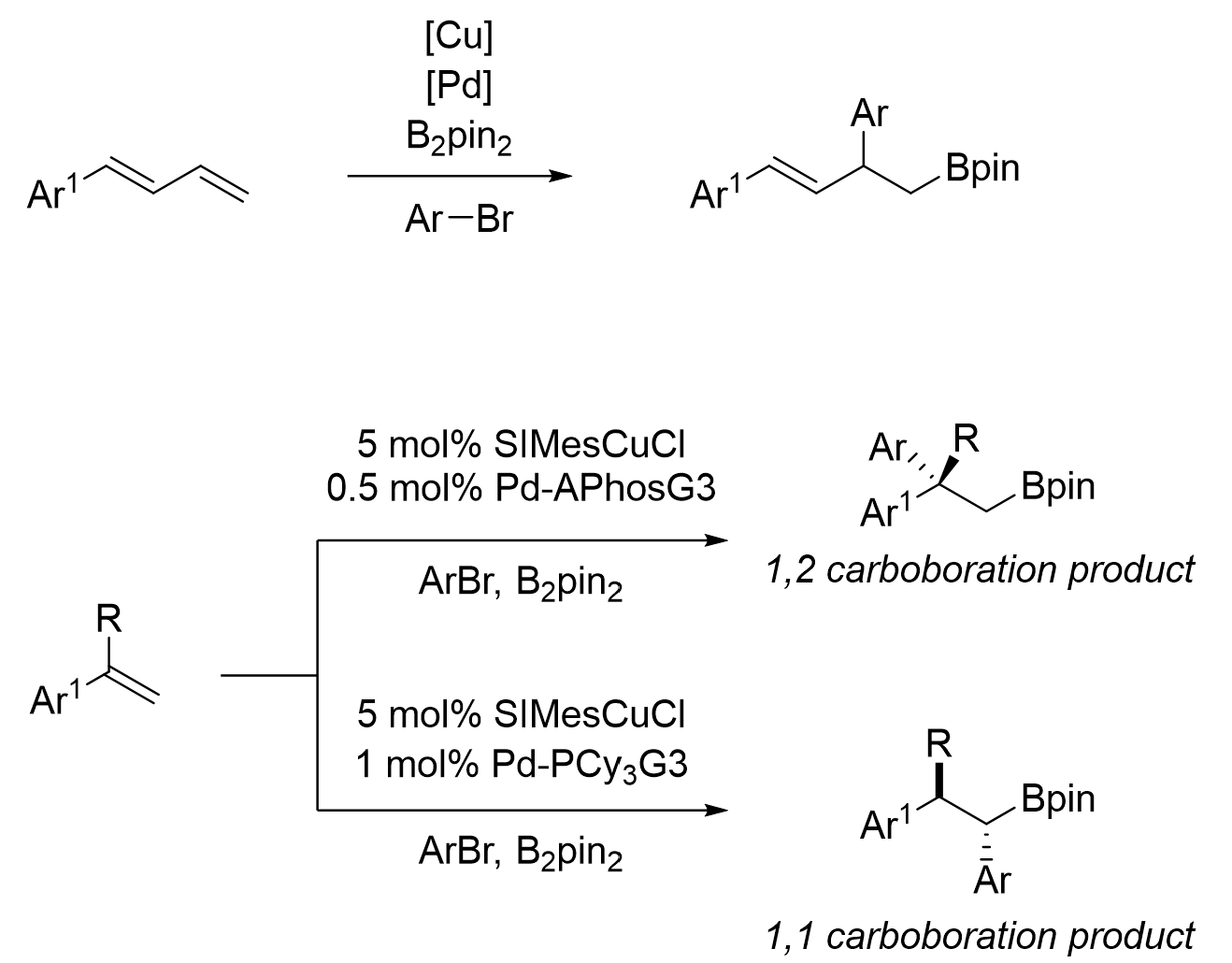
A carboboration reaction which is regioselective and enantioselective based on ligand control.

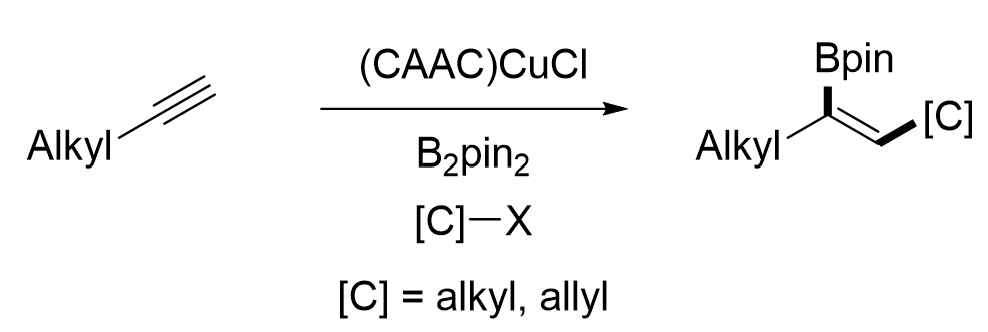
A 1,2 carboboration with reverse regioselectivity.

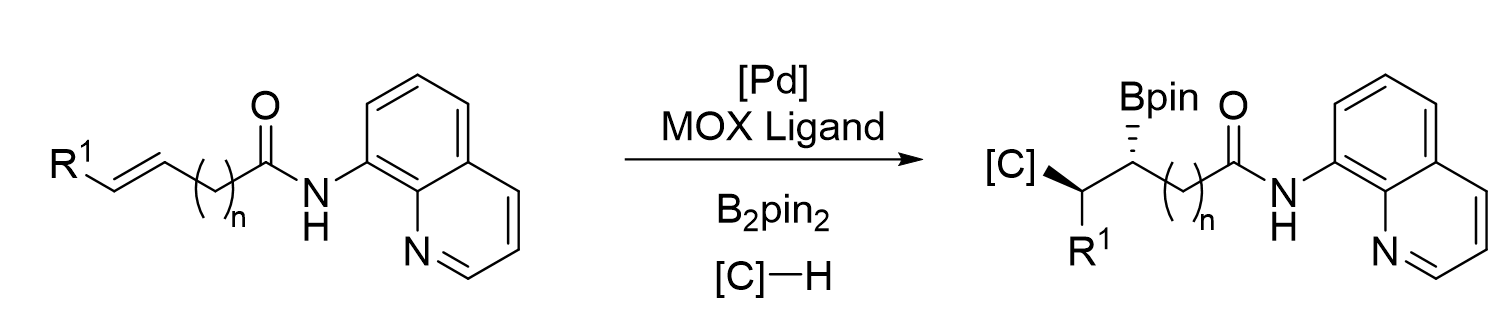
An enantioselective, AQ-directed 1,2 carboboration utilizing a nucleophile instead of an electrophile and featuring reverse regioselectivity in an unprecedented Wacker-type carboboration.

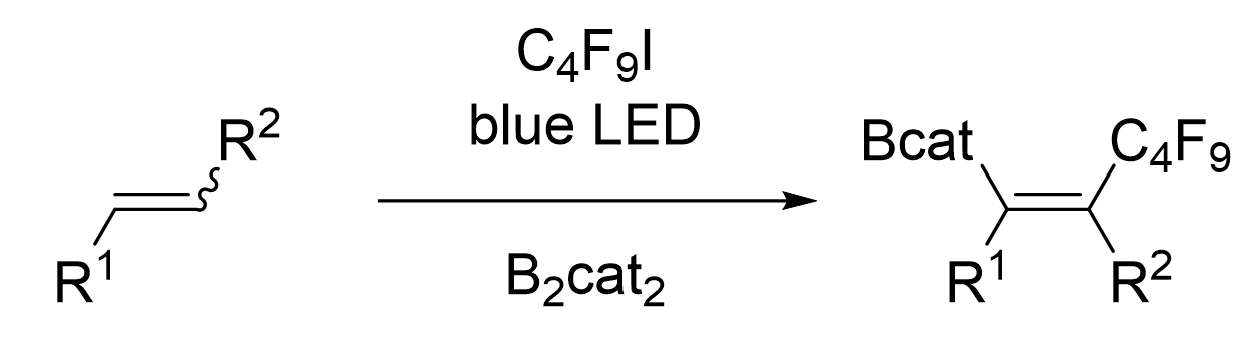
A 1,2 light-mediated carboboration believed to go through a radical mechanism.

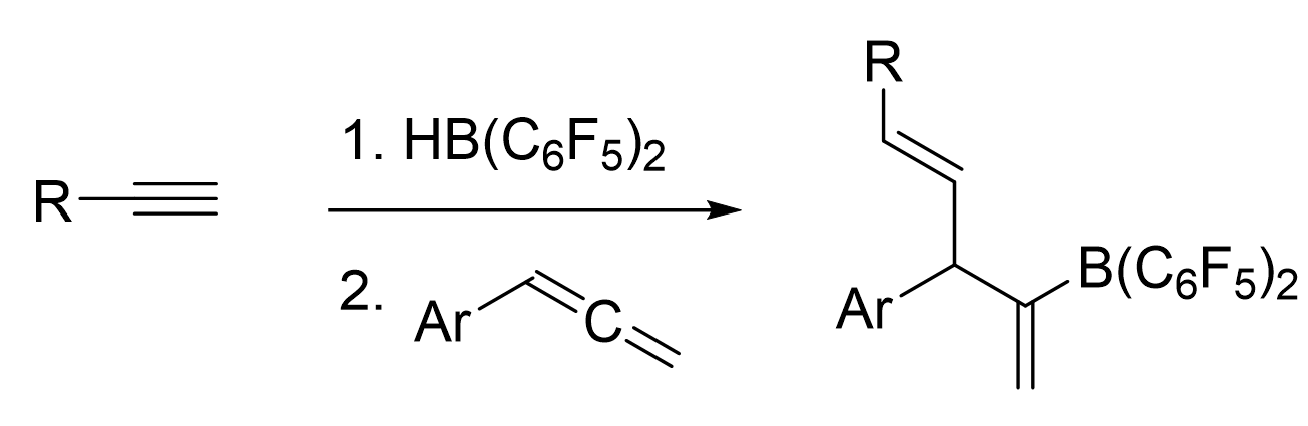
A 1,2 carboboration of an arylallene via in-situ generated alkenylboranes.

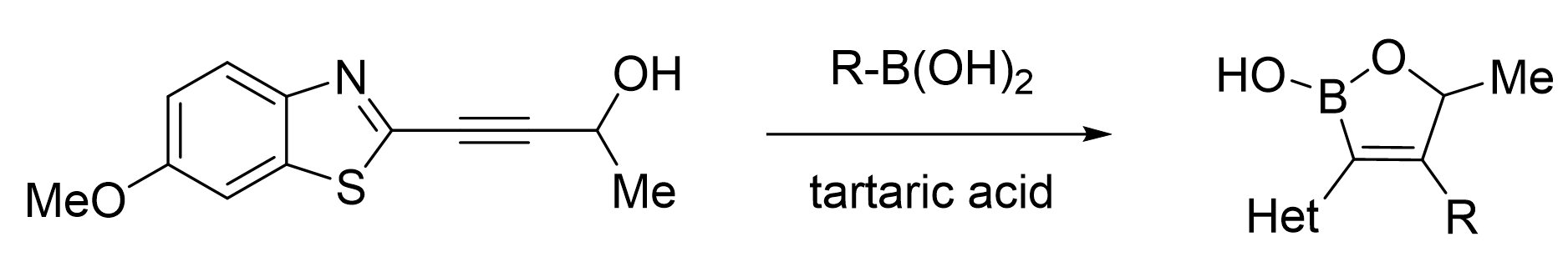
A transition-metal-free anti-carboration utilizing a boronic acid.

== 1,n Carboboration ==
A nickel-catalyzed 1,n arylboration was developed in 2019 by Yin and coworkers and remains the only example of a chain-walking arylboration. This was accomplished via a nitrogen-based ligand and a three-component coupling. The general scheme plus proposed mechanism is shown.

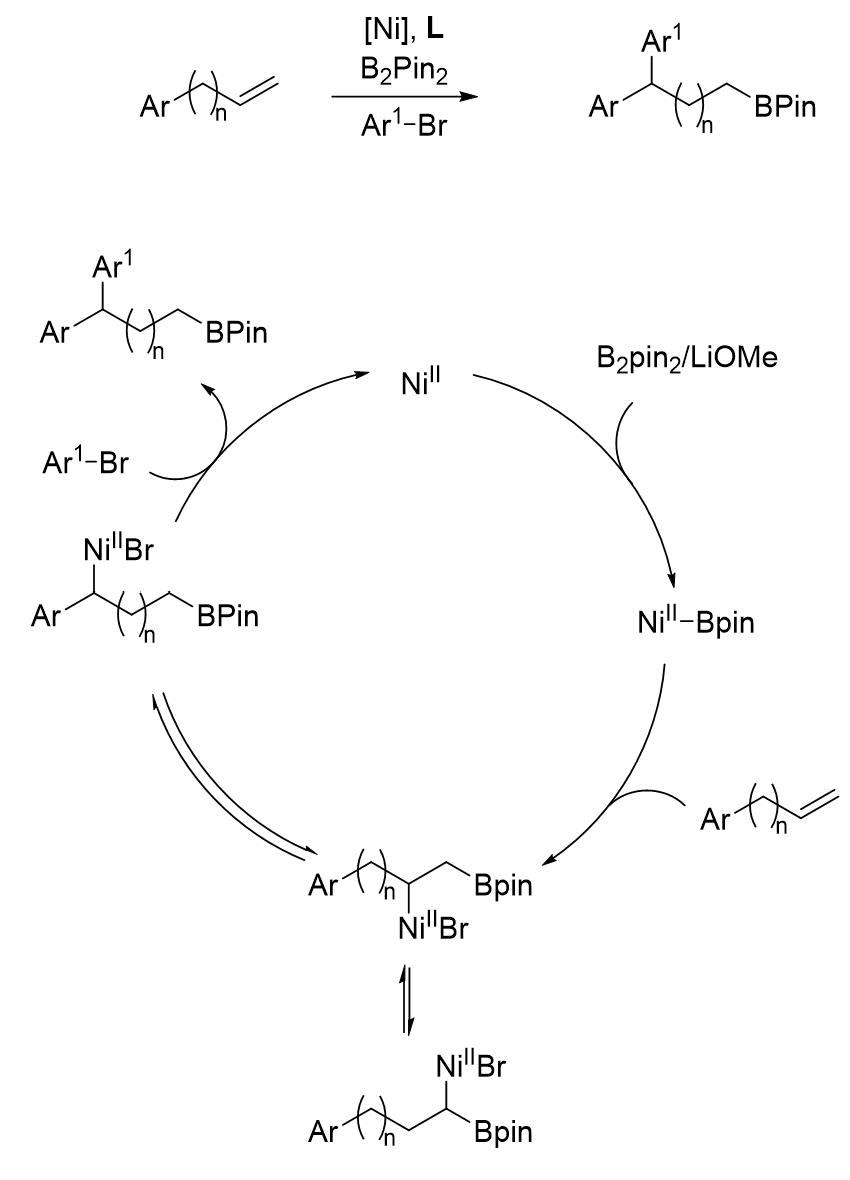
A nickel-catalyzed 1,n arylboration example with chain-walking mechanism
