= Organoaluminium chemistry =

Area of study in chemistry

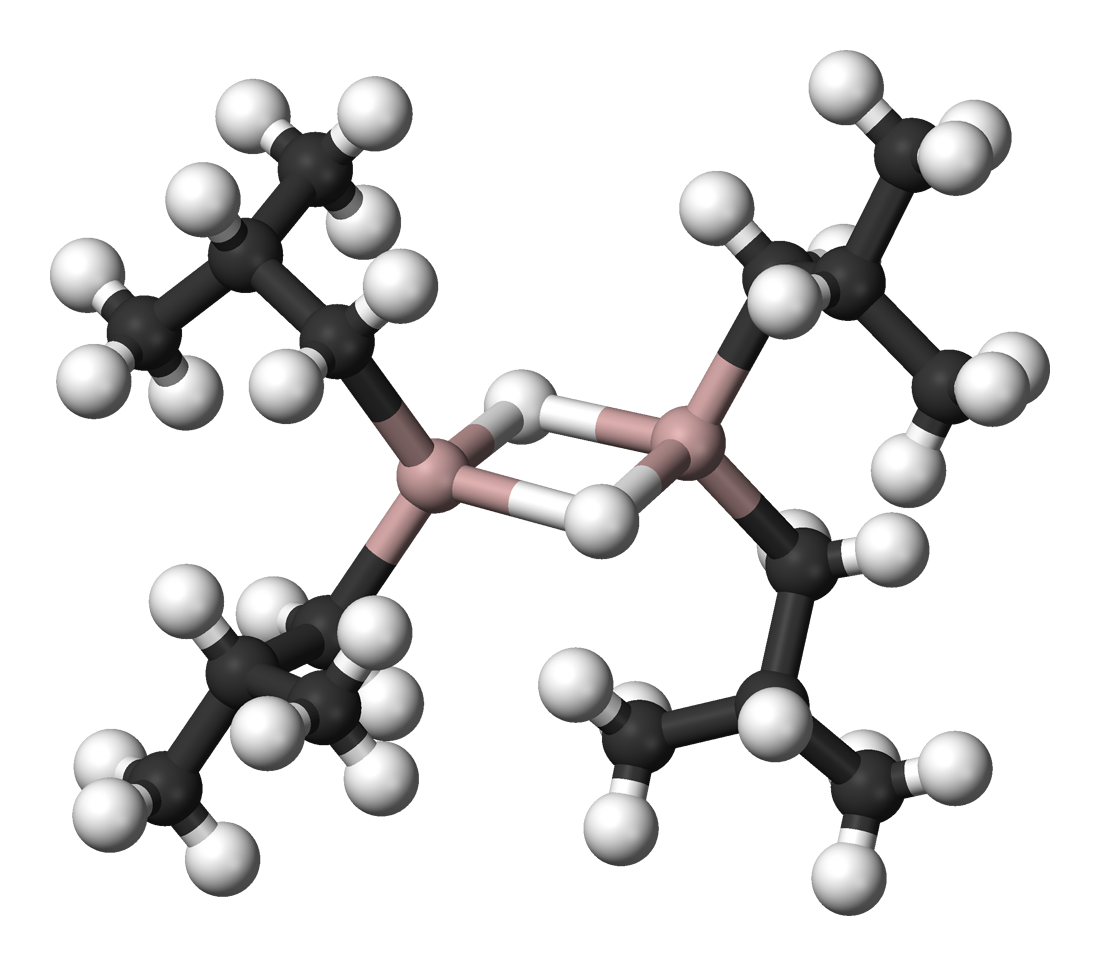
The ball-and-stick model of diisobutylaluminium hydride, showing aluminium as pink, carbon as black, and hydrogen as white.

Organoaluminium chemistry is the study of compounds containing bonds between carbon and aluminium. It is one of the major themes within organometallic chemistry. Illustrative organoaluminium compounds are the dimer trimethylaluminium, the monomer triisobutylaluminium, and the titanium-aluminium compound called Tebbe's reagent. The behavior of organoaluminium compounds can be understood in terms of the polarity of the C−Al bond and the high Lewis acidity of the three-coordinated species. Industrially, these compounds are mainly used for the production of polyolefins.

== History ==
The first organoaluminium compound (C_{2}H_{5})_{3}Al_{2}I_{3} was discovered in 1859. Organoaluminium compounds were, however, little known until the 1950s when Karl Ziegler and colleagues discovered the direct synthesis of trialkylaluminium compounds and applied these compounds to catalytic olefin polymerization. This line of research ultimately resulted in Ziegler's Nobel Prize.

== Structure and bonding ==
=== Aluminium(III) compounds ===
Organoaluminium compounds generally feature three- and four-coordinate Al centers, although higher coordination numbers are observed with inorganic ligands such as fluoride. In accord with the usual trends, four-coordinate Al prefers to be tetrahedral. In contrast to boron, aluminium is a larger atom and easily accommodates four carbon ligands. The triorganoaluminium compounds are thus usually dimeric with a pair of bridging alkyl ligands, e.g., Al_{2}(C_{2}H_{5})_{4}(μ-C_{2}H_{5})_{2}. Thus, despite its common name of triethylaluminium, this compound contains two aluminium centres, and six ethyl groups. When the organoaluminium compound contain hydride or halide, these smaller ligands tend to occupy the bridging sites. Three coordination occurs when the R groups is bulky, e.g. Al(Mes)_{3} (Mes = 2,4,6-Me_{3}C_{6}H_{2} or mesityl) or isobutyl.

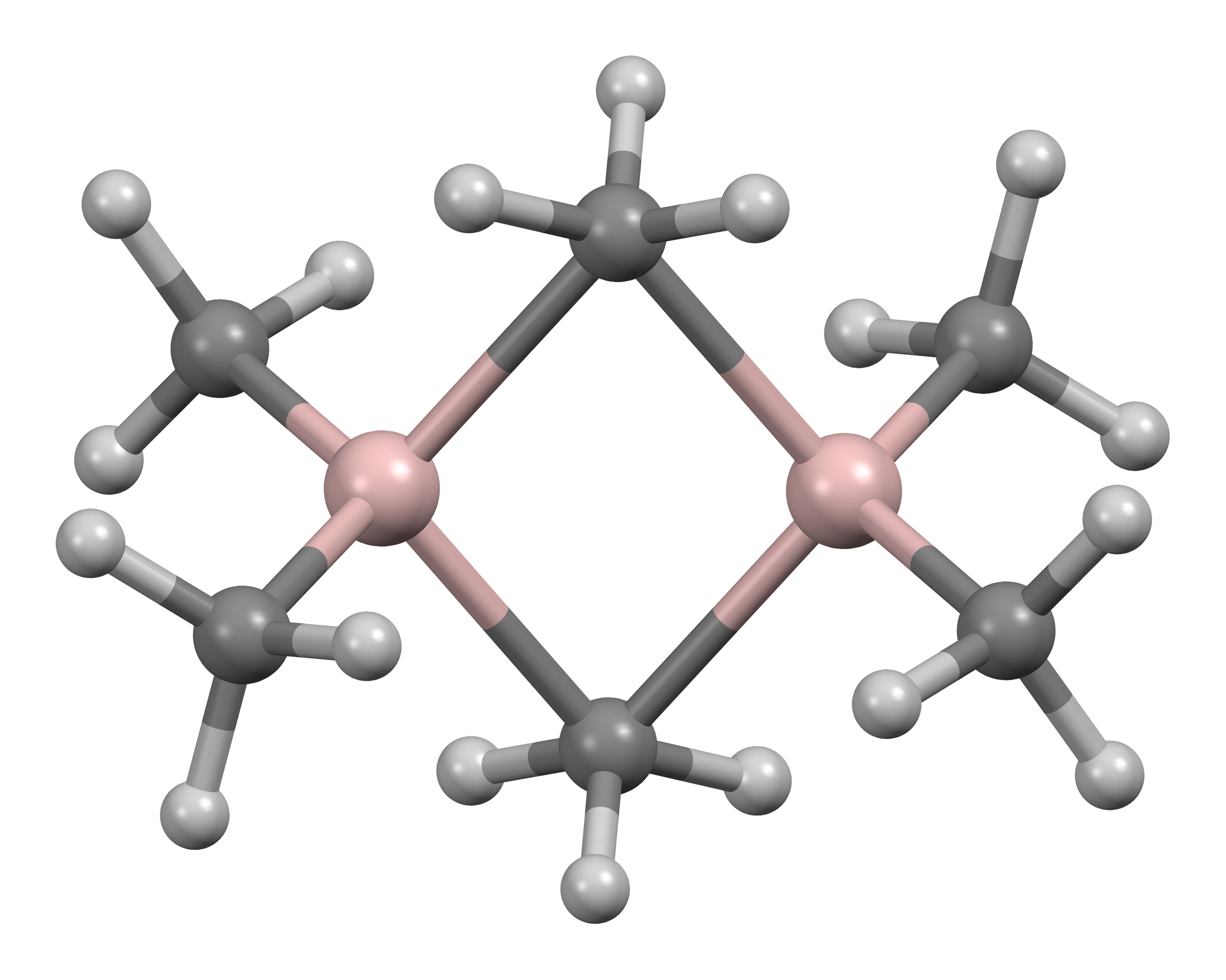
Structure of trimethylaluminium, a compound that features five-coordinate carbon.

==== Ligand exchange in trialkylaluminium compounds ====
The trialkylaluminium dimers often participate in dynamic equilibria, resulting in the interchange of bridging and terminal ligands as well as ligand exchange between dimers. Even in noncoordinating solvents, Al-Me exchange is fast, as confirmed by proton NMR spectroscopy. For example, at −25 °C the ^{1}H NMR spectrum of Me_{6}Al_{2} comprises two signals in 1:2 ratio, as expected from the solid state structure. At 20 °C, only one signal is observed because exchange of terminal and bridging methyl groups is too fast to be resolved by NMR. The high Lewis acidity of the monomeric species is related to the size of the Al(III) center and its tendency to achieve an octet configuration.

=== Low oxidation state organoaluminium compounds ===
The first organoaluminium compound with an Al-Al bond was reported in 1988 as (((Me_{3}Si)_{2}CH)_{2}Al)_{2} (a dialane). They are typically prepared reduction of the dialkylaluminium chlorides by metallic potassium:

(R_{2}AlCl)_{2} + 2 K → R_{2}Al-AlR_{2} + 2 KCl

Another notable group of alanes are tetraalanes containing four Al(I) centres. These compounds adopt a tetrahedrane core, as illustrated by (Cp*Al)_{4} and ((Me_{3}Si_{3}C)Al)_{4}. The cluster [Al_{12}(i-Bu)_{12}]^{2−} was obtained from related investigations on the reduction of organoaluminium compounds. This dianion adopts an icosahedral structure reminiscent of dodecaborate ([B_{12}H_{12}]^{2−}). Its formal oxidation state is less than one.

== Preparation ==
=== From alkyl halides and aluminium ===
Industrially, simple aluminium alkyls of the type Al_{2}R_{6} (R = Me, Et) are prepared in a two-step process beginning with the alkylation of aluminium powder:

2 Al + 3 CH_{3}CH_{2}Cl → (CH_{3}CH_{2})_{3}Al_{2}Cl_{3}

The reaction resembles the synthesis Grignard reagents. The product, (CH_{3}CH_{2})_{3}Al_{2}Cl_{3}, is called ethylaluminium sesquichloride. The term sesquichloride refers to the fact that, on average, the Cl:Al ratio is 1.5. These sesquichlorides can be converted to the triorganoaluminium derivatives by reduction:

2 (CH_{3}CH_{2})_{3}Al_{2}Cl_{3} + 6 Na → (CH_{3}CH_{2})_{6}Al_{2} + 2 Al + 6 NaCl

This method is used for production of trimethylaluminium and triethylaluminium.

The overall reaction for the production of these simple alkylaluminium compounds is thus as follows:

2Al + 6RX + 6M → Al_{2}R_{6} + 6MX (where M is an alkali metal and X is a halogen)

=== Hydroalumination ===
Aluminium powder reacts directly with certain terminal alkenes in the presence of hydrogen. The process entails two steps, the first producing dialkylaluminium hydrides. Such reactions are typically conducted at elevated temperatures and require activation by trialkylaluminium reagents:

6 Al + 3 H_{2} + 12 CH_{2}=CHR → 2 [HAl(CH_{2}CHR)_{2}]_{3}

For nonbulky R groups, the organoaluminium hydrides are typically trimeric. In a subsequent step, these hydrides are treated with more alkene to effect hydroalumiunation:

2 [HAl(CH_{2}CHR)_{2}]_{3} + 3 CH_{2}=CHR → 3 [Al_{2}(CH_{2}CHR)_{3}

Diisobutylaluminium hydride, which is dimeric, is prepared by hydride elimination from triisobutylaluminium:

2 i-Bu_{3}Al → (i-Bu_{2}AlH)_{2} + 2 (CH_{3})_{2}C=CH_{2}

=== Carboalumination ===
Organoaluminum compounds can react with alkenes and alkynes, resulting in the net addition of one organyl group and the metal fragment across the multiple bond (carboalumination). This process can proceed in a purely thermal manner or in the presence of a transition metal catalyst. For the uncatalyzed process, monoaddition is only possible when the alkene is substituted. For ethylene, carboalumination leads to a Poisson distribution of higher alkylaluminum species. The reaction is regioselective for 1-alkenes. The so-called ZACA reaction first reported by Ei-ichi Negishi is an example of an asymmetric carboalumination of alkenes catalyzed by a chiral zirconocene catalyst.

The methylalumination of alkynes in the presence of Cp_{2}ZrCl_{2} is employed for the synthesis of stereodefined trisubstituted olefin fragments, a common substructure in terpene and polyketide natural products. The synthesis of (E)-4-iodo-3-methylbut-3-en-1-ol shown below is a typical application of this reaction:

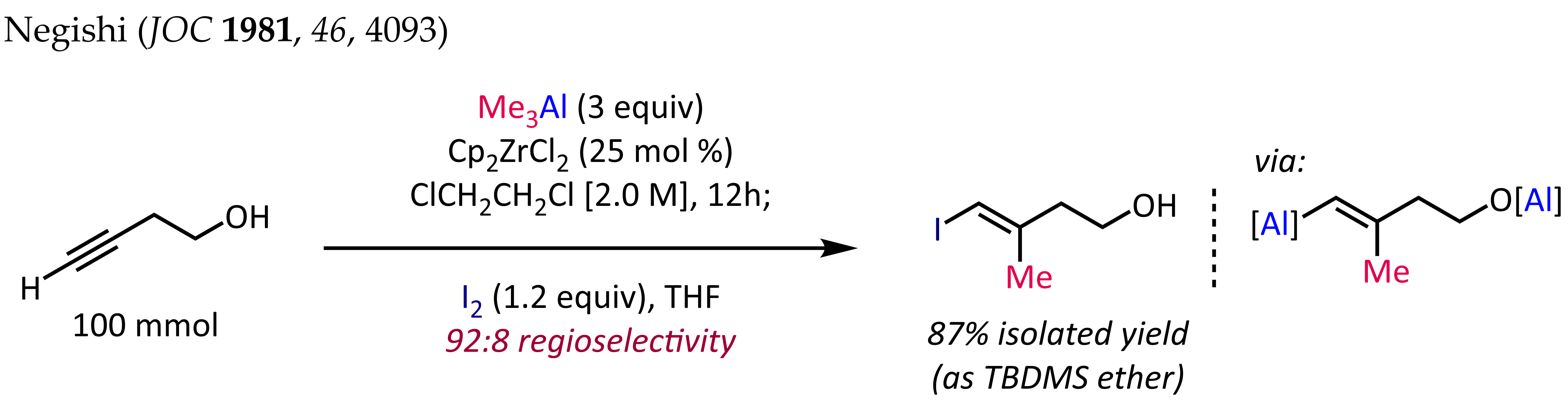

For terminal alkynes, the reaction generally proceeds with good regioselectivity (>90:10 rr) and complete syn selectivity, even in the presence of propargylic or homopropargylic heteroatom substituents. Unfortunately, extension of the zirconocene-catalyzed methylalumination to alkylalumination with higher alkyls results in lower yields and poor regioselectivities.

=== Laboratory preparations ===
Although the simple members are commercially available at low cost, many methods have been developed for their synthesis in the laboratory, including metathesis or transmetalation.

- Metathesis of aluminium trichloride with RLi or RMgX gives the trialkyl:

AlCl_{3} + 3 BuLi → Bu_{3}Al + 3 LiCl

- Transmetalation:

2 Al + 3 HgPh_{2} → 2 AlPh_{3} + 3 Hg

== Reactions ==
The high reactivity of organoaluminium compounds toward electrophiles is attributed to the charge separation between aluminium and carbon atom.

=== Lewis acidity ===
Organoaluminium compounds are hard acids and readily form adducts with bases such as pyridine, THF and tertiary amines. These adducts are tetrahedral at Al.

=== Electrophiles ===
The Al–C bond is polarized such that the carbon is highly basic. Acids react to give alkanes. For example, alcohols give alkoxides:

AlR'_{3} + ROH → 1/n (R'_{2}Al−OR)_{n} + R'H

A wide variety of acids can be employed beyond the simple mineral acids. Amines give amido derivatives. With carbon dioxide, trialkylaluminium compounds give the dialkylaluminium carboxylate, and subsequently alkyl aluminium dicarboxylates:

AlR_{3} + CO_{2} → R_{2}AlO_{2}CR
R_{2}AlO_{2}CR + CO_{2} → RAl(O_{2}CR)_{2}

The conversion is reminiscent of the carbonation of Grignard reagents.

Similarly, the reaction between trialkylaluminum compounds and carbon dioxide has been used to synthesise alcohols, olefins, or ketones.

With oxygen one obtains the corresponding alkoxides, which can be hydrolysed to the alcohols:

AlR_{3} + 3/2 O_{2} → Al(OR)_{3}

A structurally characterized organoaluminum peroxide is [{HC[C(Me)N-C_{6}H_{5}]_{2}}Al(R)-O-O-CMe_{3}] (R = CH(SiMe_{3})_{2}).

The reaction between pure trialalkylaluminum compounds and water, alcohols, phenols, amines, carbon dioxide, sulfur oxides, nitrogen oxides, halogens, and halogenated hydrocarbons can be violent.

== Applications ==
Organoaluminium compounds are widely used in the production of alkenes, alcohols, and polymers. Some relevant processes include the Ziegler Process for the production of alcohols from ethylene. Several technologies exist for the oligomerization of ethylene to give alpha-olefins. Organoaluminium compounds are used as catalysts for alkene polymerization to polyolefins, for example the catalyst methylaluminoxane.
