= Carbon group =

Periodic table group

Carbon group (group 14)
Hydrogen																															Helium
Lithium	Beryllium																									Boron	Carbon	Nitrogen	Oxygen	Fluorine	Neon
Sodium	Magnesium																									Aluminium	Silicon	Phosphorus	Sulfur	Chlorine	Argon
Potassium	Calcium															Scandium	Titanium	Vanadium	Chromium	Manganese	Iron	Cobalt	Nickel	Copper	Zinc	Gallium	Germanium	Arsenic	Selenium	Bromine	Krypton
Rubidium	Strontium															Yttrium	Zirconium	Niobium	Molybdenum	Technetium	Ruthenium	Rhodium	Palladium	Silver	Cadmium	Indium	Tin	Antimony	Tellurium	Iodine	Xenon
Caesium	Barium	Lanthanum	Cerium	Praseodymium	Neodymium	Promethium	Samarium	Europium	Gadolinium	Terbium	Dysprosium	Holmium	Erbium	Thulium	Ytterbium	Lutetium	Hafnium	Tantalum	Tungsten	Rhenium	Osmium	Iridium	Platinum	Gold	Mercury (element)	Thallium	Lead	Bismuth	Polonium	Astatine	Radon
Francium	Radium	Actinium	Thorium	Protactinium	Uranium	Neptunium	Plutonium	Americium	Curium	Berkelium	Californium	Einsteinium	Fermium	Mendelevium	Nobelium	Lawrencium	Rutherfordium	Dubnium	Seaborgium	Bohrium	Hassium	Meitnerium	Darmstadtium	Roentgenium	Copernicium	Nihonium	Flerovium	Moscovium	Livermorium	Tennessine	Oganesson
boron group ← → pnictogens
IUPAC group number	14
Name by element	carbon group
Trivial name	tetrels
CAS group number (US, pattern A-B-A)	IVA
old IUPAC number (Europe, pattern A-B)	IVB

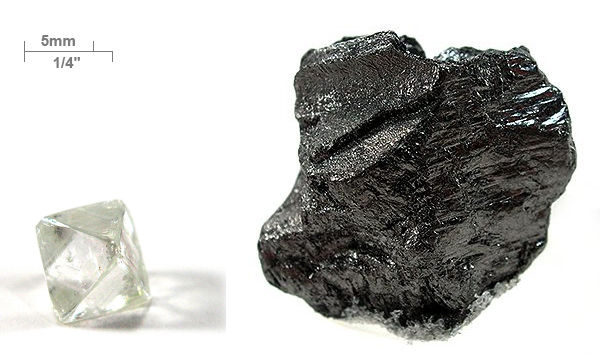
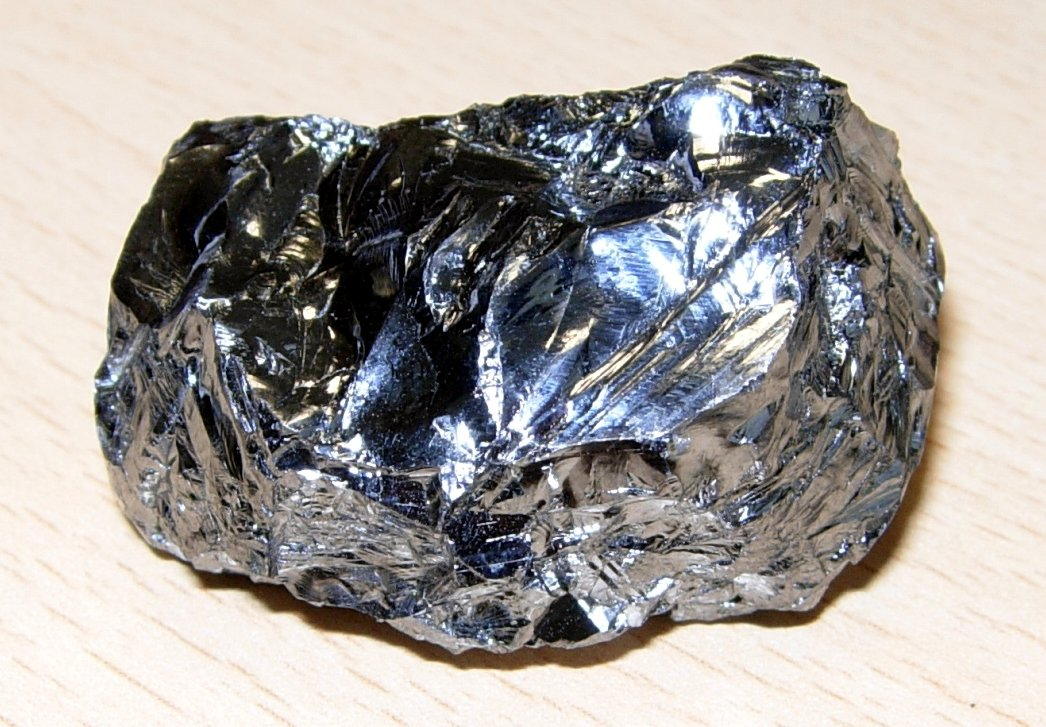
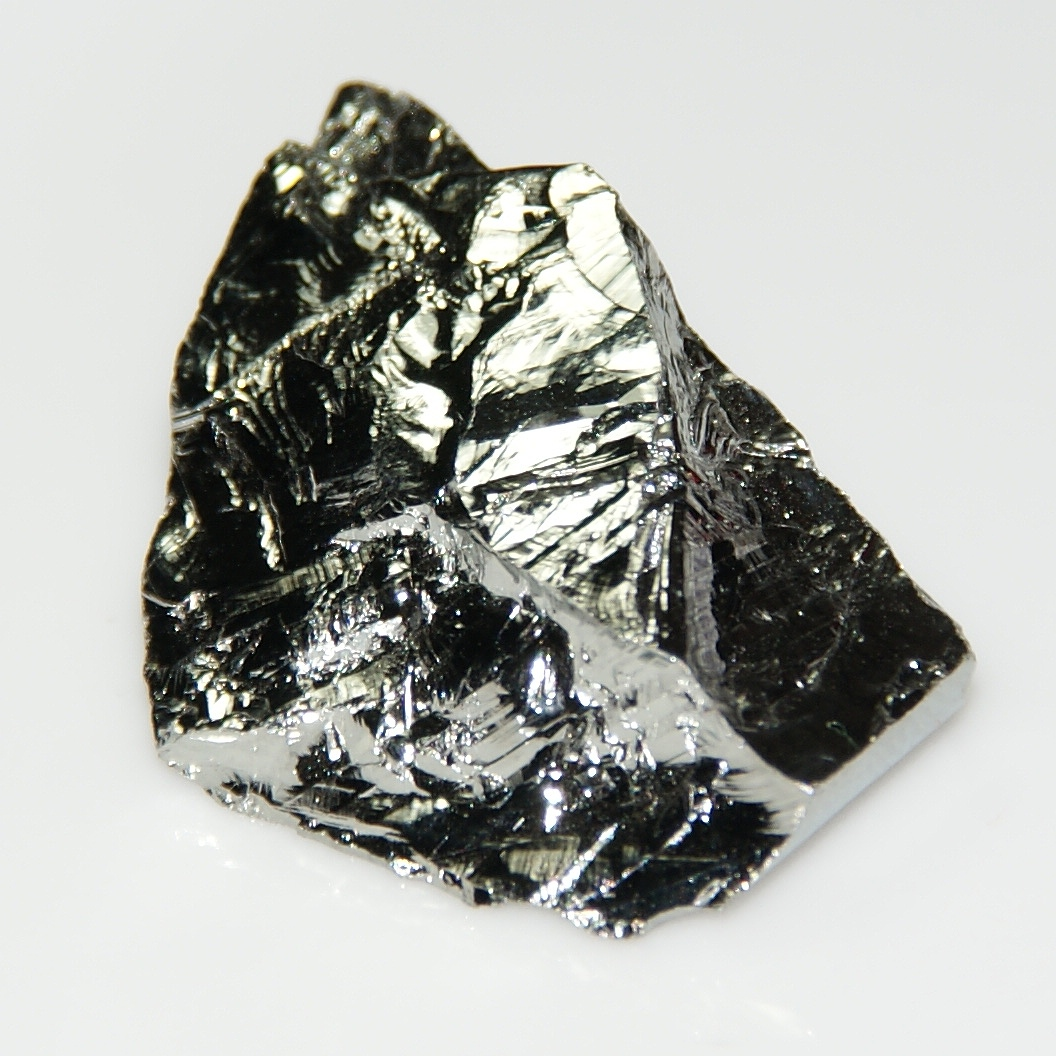
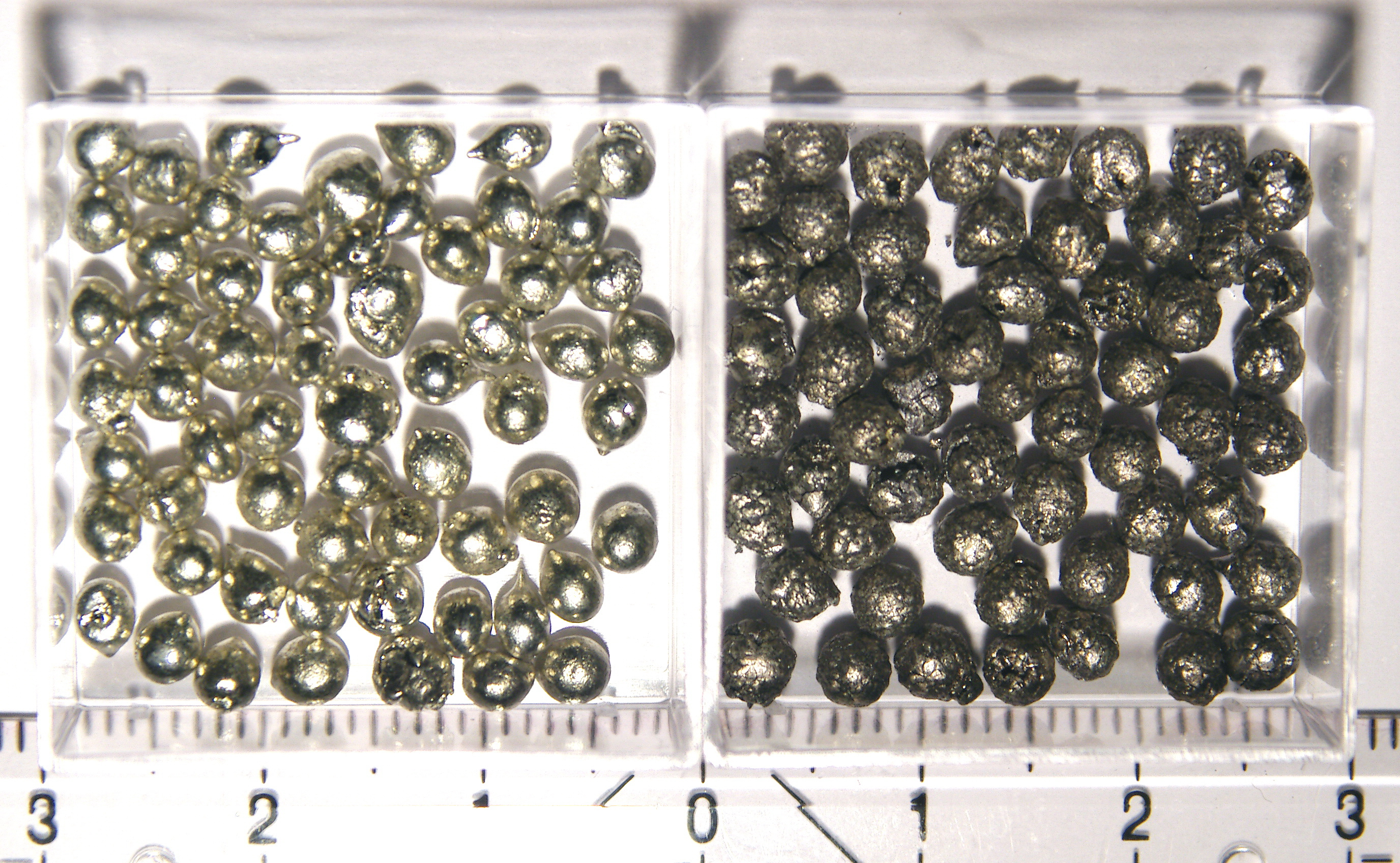
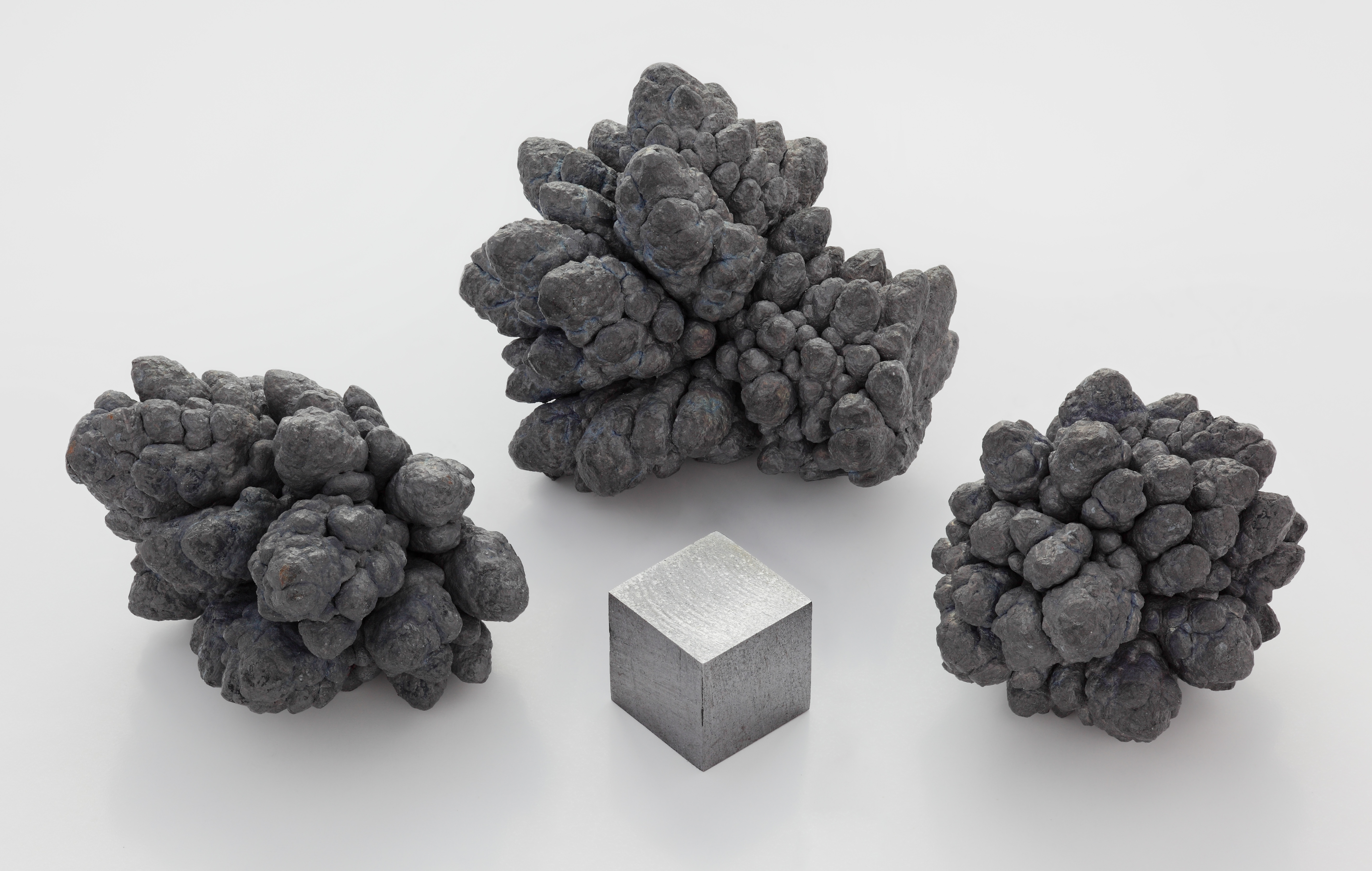
↓ Period
2	Carbon (C); 6 Other nonmetal
3	Silicon (Si); 14 Metalloid
4	Germanium (Ge); 32 Metalloid
5	Tin (Sn); 50 Other metal
6	Lead (Pb); 82 Other metal
7	Flerovium (Fl); 114 Other metal
Legend primordial element synthetic element

The carbon group is a periodic table group consisting of carbon (C), silicon (Si), germanium (Ge), tin (Sn), lead (Pb), and flerovium (Fl). It lies within the p-block.

In modern IUPAC notation, it is called group 14. In the field of semiconductor physics, it is still universally called group IV. The group is also known as the tetrels (from the Greek word tetra, which means four), stemming from the Roman numeral IV in the group name, or (not coincidentally) from the fact that these elements have four valence electrons (see below). They are also known as the crystallogens or adamantogens.

== Characteristics ==
=== Chemical ===
Like other groups, the members of this family show patterns in electron configuration, especially in the outermost shells, resulting in trends in chemical behavior:

Z	Element	Electrons per shell
6	Carbon	2, 4
14	Silicon	2, 8, 4
32	Germanium	2, 8, 18, 4
50	Tin	2, 8, 18, 18, 4
82	Lead	2, 8, 18, 32, 18, 4
114	Flerovium	2, 8, 18, 32, 32, 18, 4 (predicted)

Each of the elements in this group has 4 electrons in its outer shell. An isolated, neutral group 14 atom has the ns^{2} np^{2} configuration in the ground state. These elements, especially carbon and silicon, have a strong propensity for covalent bonding, which usually brings the outer shell to eight electrons. Bonds in these elements often lead to hybridisation where distinct s and p characters of the orbitals are erased. For single bonds, a typical arrangement has four pairs of sp^{3} electrons, although other cases exist too, such as three sp^{2} pairs in graphene and graphite. Double bonds are characteristic for carbon (alkenes, CO_{2}...); the same for π-systems in general. The tendency to lose electrons increases as the size of the atom increases, as it does with increasing atomic number.

Carbon alone forms monatomic anions, in the form of carbide (C^{4−}, also called methanide); the other carbon group elements form Zintl ions with electropositive metals such as magnesium. Silicon and germanium, both metalloids, each can form +4 ions. Tin and lead both are metals, while flerovium is a synthetic, radioactive (its half-life is very short, only 1.9 seconds) element that may have a few noble gas-like properties, though it is still most likely a post-transition metal. Tin and lead are both capable of forming +2 ions. Although tin is typically considered a metal, its α allotrope looks more like germanium than like a metal and it is a poor electric conductor.

Among main group (groups 1, 2, 13–17) alkyl derivatives QR_{n}, where n is the standard bonding number for Q (see lambda convention), the group 14 derivatives QR_{4} are notable in being electron-precise: they are neither electron-deficient (having fewer electrons than an octet and tending to be Lewis acidic at Q and usually existing as oligomeric clusters or adducts with Lewis bases) nor electron-excessive (having lone pair(s) at Q and tending to be Lewis basic at Q). As a result, the group 14 alkyls have low chemical reactivity relative to the alkyl derivatives of other groups. In the case of carbon, the high bond dissociation energy of the C–C bond and lack of electronegativity difference between the central atom and the alkyl ligands render the saturated alkyl derivatives, the alkanes, particularly inert.

Carbon forms tetrahalides with all the halogens. Carbon also forms many oxides such as carbon monoxide, carbon suboxide, and carbon dioxide. Carbon forms a disulfide an a diselenide.

Silicon forms several hydrides; two of them are SiH_{4} and Si_{2}H_{6}. Silicon forms tetrahalides with fluorine (SiF_{4}), chlorine (SiCl_{4}), bromine (SiBr_{4}), and iodine (SiI_{4}). Silicon also forms a dioxide and a disulfide. Silicon nitride has the formula Si_{3}N_{4}.

Germanium forms five hydrides. The first two germanium hydrides are GeH_{4} and Ge_{2}H_{6}. Germanium forms tetrahalides with all halogens except astatine and forms dihalides with all halogens except bromine and astatine. Germanium bonds to all natural single chalcogens except polonium, and forms dioxides, disulfides, and diselenides. Germanium nitride has the formula Ge_{3}N_{4}.

Tin forms two hydrides: SnH_{4} and Sn_{2}H_{6}. Tin forms dihalides and tetrahalides with all halogens except astatine. Tin forms monochalcogenides with naturally occurring chalcogens except polonium, and forms dichalcogenides with naturally occurring chalcogens except polonium and tellurium.

Lead forms one hydride, which has the formula PbH_{4}. Lead forms dihalides and tetrahalides with fluorine and chlorine, and forms a dibromide and a diiodide, although the tetrabromide and tetraiodide of lead are unstable. Lead forms four oxides, a sulfide, a selenide, and a telluride.

There are no known compounds of flerovium.

=== Physical ===
The boiling points of the carbon group tend to get lower with the heavier elements. At standard pressure, carbon, the lightest carbon group element, sublimes at 3825 °C. Silicon's boiling point is 3265 °C, germanium's is 2833 °C, tin's is 2602 °C, and lead's is 1749 °C. Flerovium is predicted to boil at −60 °C. The melting points of the carbon group elements have roughly the same trend as their boiling points. Silicon melts at 1414 °C, germanium melts at 939 °C, tin melts at 232 °C, and lead melts at 328 °C.

Carbon's crystal structure is hexagonal; at high pressures and temperatures it forms diamond (see below). Silicon and germanium have diamond cubic crystal structures, as does tin at low temperatures (below 13.2 °C). Tin at room temperature has a tetragonal crystal structure. Lead has a face-centered cubic crystal structure.

The densities of the carbon group elements tend to increase with increasing atomic number. Carbon has a density of 2.26 g·cm^{−3}; silicon, 2.33 g·cm^{−3}; germanium, 5.32 g·cm^{−3}; tin, 7.26 g·cm^{−3}; lead, 11.3 g·cm^{−3}.

The atomic radii of the carbon group elements tend to increase with increasing atomic number. Carbon's atomic radius is 77 picometers, silicon's is 118 picometers, germanium's is 123 picometers, tin's is 141 picometers, and lead's is 175 picometers.

==== Allotropes ====
Carbon has multiple allotropes. The most common is graphite, which is carbon in the form of stacked sheets. Another form of carbon is diamond, but this is relatively rare. Amorphous carbon is a third allotrope of carbon; it is a component of soot. Another allotrope of carbon is a fullerene, which has the form of sheets of carbon atoms folded into a sphere. A fifth allotrope of carbon, discovered in 2003, is called graphene, and is in the form of a layer of carbon atoms arranged in a honeycomb-shaped formation.

Silicon has two known allotropes that exist at room temperature. These allotropes are known as the amorphous and the crystalline allotropes. The amorphous allotrope is a brown powder. The crystalline allotrope is gray and has a metallic luster.

Tin has two allotropes: α-tin, also known as gray tin, and β-tin. Tin is typically found in the β-tin form, a silvery metal. However, at standard pressure, β-tin converts to α-tin, a gray powder, at temperatures below 13.2 °C (55.8 °F). This can cause tin objects in cold temperatures to crumble to gray powder in a process known as tin pest or tin rot.

=== Nuclear ===
At least two of the carbon group elements (tin and lead) have magic nuclei, meaning that these elements are more common and more stable than elements that do not have a magic nucleus.

==== Isotopes ====
There are 15 known isotopes of carbon. Of these, three are naturally occurring. The most common is stable carbon-12, followed by stable carbon-13. Carbon-14 is a natural radioactive isotope with a half-life of 5,730 years.

23 isotopes of silicon have been discovered. Five of these are naturally occurring. The most common is stable silicon-28, followed by stable silicon-29 and stable silicon-30. Silicon-32 is a radioactive isotope that occurs naturally as a result of radioactive decay of actinides, and via spallation in the upper atmosphere. Silicon-34 also occurs naturally as the result of radioactive decay of actinides.

32 isotopes of germanium have been discovered. Five of these are naturally occurring. The most common is the stable germanium-74, followed by stable germanium-72, stable germanium-70, and stable germanium-73. Germanium-76 is a primordial radioisotope.

40 isotopes of tin have been discovered. 14 of these occur in nature. The most common is tin-120, followed by tin-118, tin-116, tin-119, tin-117, tin-124, tin-122, tin-112, and tin-114: all of these are stable. Tin also has four radioisotopes that occur as the result of the radioactive decay of uranium. These isotopes are tin-121, tin-123, tin-125, and tin-126.

38 isotopes of lead have been discovered. 9 of these are naturally occurring. The most common isotope is lead-208, followed by lead-206, lead-207, and lead-204: all of these are stable. 5 isotopes of lead occur from the radioactive decay of uranium and thorium. These isotopes are lead-209, lead-210, lead-211, lead-212 and lead-214.

6 isotopes of flerovium (flerovium-284, flerovium-285, flerovium-286, flerovium-287, flerovium-288, and flerovium-289) have been discovered, all from human synthesis. Flerovium's most stable isotope is flerovium-289, which has a half-life of 2.6 seconds.

== Occurrence ==
Carbon accumulates as the result of stellar fusion in most stars, even small ones. Carbon is present in the Earth's crust in concentrations of 480 parts per million, and is present in seawater at concentrations of 28 parts per million. Carbon is present in the atmosphere in the form of carbon monoxide, carbon dioxide, and methane. Carbon is a key constituent of carbonate minerals, and is in hydrogen carbonate, which is common in seawater. Carbon forms 22.8% of a typical human.

Silicon is present in the Earth's crust at concentrations of 28%, making it the second most abundant element there. Silicon's concentration in seawater can vary from 30 parts per billion on the surface of the ocean to 2000 parts per billion deeper down. Silicon dust occurs in trace amounts in Earth's atmosphere. Silicate minerals are the most common type of mineral on earth. Silicon makes up 14.3 parts per million of the human body on average. Only the largest stars produce silicon via stellar fusion.

Germanium makes up 2 parts per million of the Earth's crust, making it the 52nd most abundant element there. On average, germanium makes up 1 part per million of soil. Germanium makes up 0.5 parts per trillion of seawater. Organogermanium compounds are also found in seawater. Germanium occurs in the human body at concentrations of 71.4 parts per billion. Germanium has been found to exist in some very faraway stars.

Tin makes up 2 parts per million of the Earth's crust, making it the 49th most abundant element there. On average, tin makes up 1 part per million of soil. Tin exists in seawater at concentrations of 4 parts per trillion. Tin makes up 428 parts per billion of the human body. Tin(IV) oxide occurs at concentrations of 0.1 to 300 parts per million in soils. Tin also occurs in concentrations of one part per thousand in igneous rocks.

Lead makes up 14 parts per million of the Earth's crust, making it the 36th most abundant element there. On average, lead makes up 23 parts per million of soil, but the concentration can reach 20000 parts per million (2 percent) near old lead mines. Lead exists in seawater at concentrations of 2 parts per trillion. Lead makes up 1.7 parts per million of the human body by weight. Human activity releases more lead into the environment than any other metal.

Flerovium doesn't occur in nature at all, so it only exists in particle accelerators with a few atoms at a time.

== History ==
=== Discoveries and uses in antiquity ===
Carbon, tin, and lead are a few of the elements well known in the ancient world, together with sulfur, iron, copper, mercury, silver, and gold.

Silicon as silica in the form of rock crystal was familiar to the predynastic Egyptians, who used it for beads and small vases; to the early Chinese; and probably to many others of the ancients. The manufacture of glass containing silica was carried out both by the Egyptians – at least as early as 1500 BCE – and by the Phoenicians. Many of the naturally occurring compounds or silicate minerals were used in various kinds of mortar for construction of dwellings by the earliest people.

The origins of tin seem to be lost in history. It appears that bronzes, which are alloys of copper and tin, were used by prehistoric man some time before the pure metal was isolated. Bronzes were common in early Mesopotamia, the Indus Valley, Egypt, Crete, Israel, and Peru. Much of the tin used by the early Mediterranean peoples apparently came from the Scilly Isles and Cornwall in the British Isles, where mining of the metal dates from about 300–200 BCE. Tin mines were operating in both the Inca and Aztec areas of South and Central America before the Spanish conquest.

Lead is mentioned often in early Biblical accounts. The Babylonians used the metal as plates on which to record inscriptions. The Romans used it for tablets, water pipes, coins, and even cooking utensils; indeed, as a result of the last use, lead poisoning was recognized in the time of Augustus Caesar. The compound known as white lead was apparently prepared as a decorative pigment at least as early as 200 BCE.

=== Modern discoveries ===
Amorphous elemental silicon was first obtained pure in 1824 by the Swedish chemist Jöns Jacob Berzelius; impure silicon had already been obtained in 1811. Crystalline elemental silicon was not prepared until 1854, when it was obtained as a product of electrolysis.

Germanium is one of three elements the existence of which was predicted in 1869 by the Russian chemist Dmitri Mendeleev when he first devised his periodic table. However, the element was not actually discovered for some time. In September 1885, a miner discovered a mineral sample in a silver mine and gave it to the mine manager, who determined that it was a new mineral and sent the mineral to Clemens A. Winkler. Winkler realized that the sample was 75% silver, 18% sulfur, and 7% of an undiscovered element. After several months, Winkler isolated the element and determined that it was element 32.

The first attempt to discover flerovium (then referred to as "element 114") was in 1969, at the Joint Institute for Nuclear Research, but it was unsuccessful. In 1977, researchers at the Joint Institute for Nuclear Research bombarded plutonium-244 atoms with calcium-48, but were again unsuccessful. This nuclear reaction was repeated in 1998, this time successfully.

=== Etymologies ===
- Carbon comes from the Latin word carbo, meaning "charcoal".
- Silicon comes from the Latin word silex (or silicis), meaning "flint".
- Germanium comes from the Latin word Germania, the Latin name for Germany, which is the country where germanium was discovered.
- Stannum comes from the Latin word stannum, meaning "tin", from or related to Celtic staen.

- The common name for stannum in English is tin, inherited directly from Old English. Possibly of common origin with stannum and staen.

- Plumbum comes from the Latin word plumbum meaning lead.

- The common name for plumbum in English is lead, inherited directly from Old English.

- Flerovium was named after Georgy Flyorov and his Institute.

== Applications ==
Carbon is most commonly used in its amorphous form. In this form, carbon is used for steelmaking, as carbon black, as a filling in tires, in respirators, and as activated charcoal. Carbon is also used in the form of graphite, for example as the lead in pencils. Diamond, another form of carbon, is commonly used in jewelry. Carbon fibers are used in numerous applications, such as satellite struts, because the fibers are highly strong yet elastic.

Silicon dioxide has a wide variety of applications, including toothpaste, construction fillers, and silica is a major component of glass. 50% of pure silicon is devoted to the manufacture of metal alloys. 45% of silicon is devoted to the manufacture of silicones. Silicon is also commonly used in semiconductors and has been since the 1950s.

Germanium was used in semiconductors until the 1950s, when it was replaced by silicon. Radiation detectors contain germanium. Germanium dioxide is used in fiber optics and wide-angle camera lenses. A small amount of germanium mixed with silver can make silver tarnish-proof. The resulting alloy is known as argentium sterling silver.

Solder is the most important use of tin; 50% of all tin produced goes into this application. 20% of all tin produced is used in tin plate. 20% of tin is used by the chemical industry. Tin is a constituent of numerous alloys, including pewter. Tin(IV) oxide has been commonly used in ceramics for thousands of years. Cobalt stannate is a tin compound which is used as a cerulean blue pigment.

80% of all lead produced goes into lead–acid batteries. Other applications for lead include weights, pigments, and shielding against radioactive materials. Lead was historically used in gasoline in the form of tetraethyllead, but this application has been discontinued due to concerns of toxicity.

== Production ==
Carbon's allotrope diamond is produced mostly by Russia, Botswana, Congo, Canada, South Africa, and India. 80% of all synthetic diamonds are produced by Russia. China produces 70% of the world's graphite. Other graphite-mining countries are Brazil, Canada, and Mexico.

Silicon can be produced by heating silica with carbon.

There are some germanium ores, such as germanite, but these are not mined on account of being rare. Instead, germanium is extracted from the ores of metals such as zinc. In Russia and China, germanium is also separated from coal deposits. Germanium-containing ores are first treated with chlorine to form germanium tetrachloride, which is mixed with hydrogen gas. Then the germanium is further refined by zone refining. Roughly 140 metric tons of germanium are produced each year.

Mines output 300,000 metric tons of tin each year. China, Indonesia, Peru, Bolivia, and Brazil are the main producers of tin. The method by which tin is produced is to heat the tin mineral cassiterite (SnO_{2}) with coke.

The most commonly mined lead ore is galena (lead sulfide). 4 million metric tons of lead are newly mined each year, mostly in China, Australia, the United States, and Peru. The ores are mixed with coke and limestone and roasted to produce pure lead. Most lead is recycled from lead batteries. The total amount of lead ever mined by humans amounts to 350 million metric tons.

== Biological role ==
Carbon is a key element to all known life. It is in all organic compounds, for example, DNA, steroids, and proteins. Carbon's importance to life is primarily due to its ability to form numerous bonds with other elements. There are 16 kilograms of carbon in a typical 70-kilogram human.

Silicon-based life's feasibility is commonly discussed. However, it is less able than carbon to form elaborate rings and chains. Silicon in the form of silicon dioxide is used by diatoms and sea sponges to form their cell walls and skeletons. Silicon is essential for bone growth in chickens and rats and may also be essential in humans. Humans consume on average between 20 and 1200 milligrams of silicon per day, mostly from cereals. There is 1 gram of silicon in a typical 70-kilogram human.

A biological role for germanium is not known, although it does stimulate metabolism. In 1980, germanium was reported by Kazuhiko Asai to benefit health, but the claim has not been proven. Some plants take up germanium from the soil in the form of germanium oxide. These plants, which include grains and vegetables contain roughly 0.05 parts per million of germanium. The estimated human intake of germanium is 1 milligram per day. There are 5 milligrams of germanium in a typical 70-kilogram human.

Tin has been shown to be essential for proper growth in rats, but there is, as of 2013, no evidence to indicate that humans need tin in their diet. Plants do not require tin. However, plants do collect tin in their roots. Wheat and maize contain 7 and 3 parts per million respectively. However, the level of tin in plants can reach 2000 parts per million if the plants are near a tin smelter. On average, humans consume 0.3 milligrams of tin per day. There are 30 milligrams of tin in a typical 70-kilogram human.

Lead has no known biological role, and is in fact highly toxic, but some microbes are able to survive in lead-contaminated environments. Some plants, such as cucumbers contain up to tens of parts per million of lead. There are 120 milligrams of lead in a typical 70-kilogram human.

Flerovium has no biological role and instead is found and made only in particle accelerators.

=== Toxicity ===
Elemental carbon is not generally toxic, but many of its compounds are, such as carbon monoxide and hydrogen cyanide. However, carbon dust can be dangerous because it lodges in the lungs in a manner similar to asbestos.

Silicon minerals are not typically poisonous. However, silicon dioxide dust, such as that emitted by volcanoes can cause adverse health effects if it enters the lungs.

Germanium can interfere with such enzymes as lactate dehydrogenase and alcohol dehydrogenase. Organic germanium compounds are more toxic than inorganic germanium compounds. Germanium has a low degree of oral toxicity in animals. Severe germanium poisoning can cause death by respiratory paralysis.

Some tin compounds are toxic to ingest, but most inorganic compounds of tin are considered nontoxic. Organic tin compounds, such as trimethyltin and triethyltin are highly toxic, and can disrupt metabolic processes inside cells.

Lead and its compounds, such as lead acetates are highly toxic. Lead poisoning can cause headaches, stomach pain, constipation, and gout.

Flerovium is too radioactive to test if it's toxic or not although its high radioactivity alone would be toxic.
