= Organogermanium chemistry =

Organic Chemistry involving Germanium

Organogermanium chemistry is the science of chemical species containing one or more C–Ge bonds. Germanium shares group 14 in the periodic table with carbon, silicon, tin and lead. Historically, organogermanes are considered as nucleophiles and the reactivity of them is between that of organosilicon and organotin compounds. Some organogermanes have enhanced reactivity compared with their organosilicon and organoboron analogues in some cross-coupling reactions.

In general, organogermanium chemistry is much less well-developed than the other group-14 congeners, mainly because germanium is expensive.

== Synthesis ==
The great majority of organogermanium compounds are tetrahedral with the formula GeR_{4−n}X_{n} where X = H, Cl, Br, I. Ge-C bonds are air-stable, although Ge-H bonds can undergo air-oxidation. The first organogermanium compound, tetraethylgermane, synthesized by Winkler in 1887, by the reaction of germanium tetrachloride with diethylzinc. More commonly, these Ge(IV) compounds are prepared by alkylation of germanium halides by organolithium and Grignard reagents, including surfaces terminated with Ge-Cl bonds. Recent work, however, has developed chlorine-free germanium processing.

Some organogermanes are prepared by nucleophilic substitution or Pd-catalyzed cross-coupling reactions. Hydrogermylation provides another route to organogermanium compounds.

=== Catenation ===
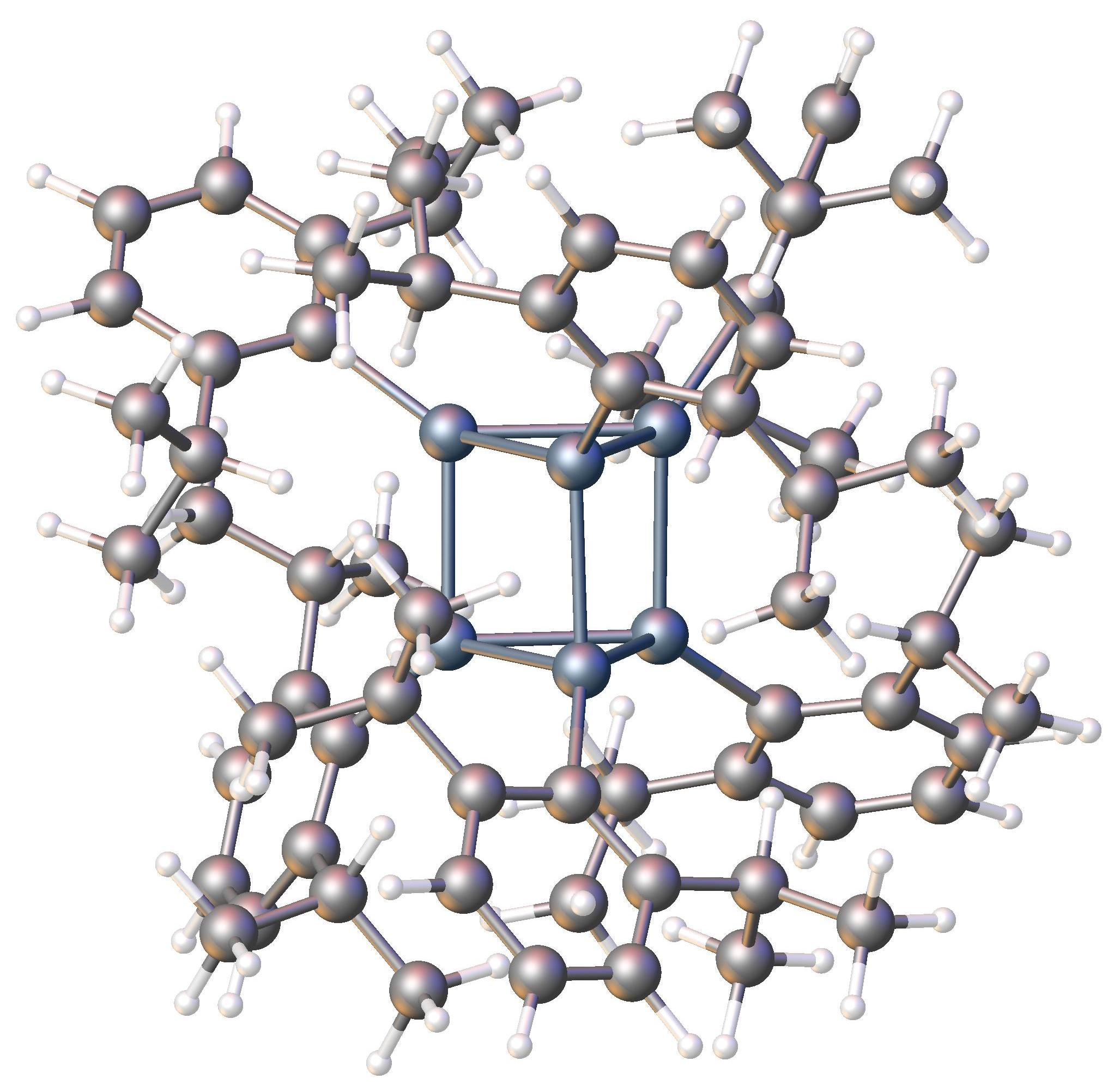
Structure of the trigonal prismatic [GeAr]_{6} where Ar = 2,6-(iPr)_{2}C_{6}H_{3}. Color code: blue-gray = Ge, gray = C.

Akin to hydrocarbons and polysilanes, many organogermanium compounds are known with Ge-Ge bonds. An early example is hexaphenyldigermane, (C_{6}H_{5})_{3}Ge−Ge(C_{6}H_{5})_{3}. It is prepared by Wurtz coupling of the bromide:

2 (C_{6}H_{5})_{3}GeBr + 2 Na → (C_{6}H_{5})_{3}Ge−Ge(C_{6}H_{5})_{3} + 2 NaBr

Many cyclic polygermanes are known, e.g. [Ge(C_{6}H_{5})_{2}]_{4}, [Ge(C_{6}H_{5})_{2}]_{5}, and [Ge(C_{6}H_{5})_{2}]_{6}.

=== Germanols ===
Triphenylgermanol ((C_{6}H_{5})_{3}GeOH) is a colorless solid. Like the isostructural silanol, it engages in hydrogen bonding in the solid-state.

== Multiple bonds to Ge ==
Compounds with multiple bonds to Ge are usually highly reactive or require bulky organic substituents for their isolation. This situation follows from the double bond rule. Digermynes only exist for extremely bulky substituents. According to X-ray crystallography, the C–Ge≡Ge–C core of digermynes is bent. Such compounds are prepared by the reduction of bulky arylgermanium(II) halides.

Compounds containing Ge=C (germenes) double bonds require bulky organic substituents for their isolation. and Ge=Ge (digermylenes) Other examples include the bulky derivatives of germabenzene and 1,2-digermabenzene, analogues of benzene.

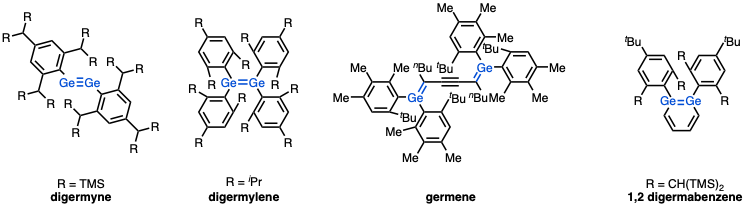

== Germylenes and germanium radicals ==
Germylenes (carbene analogues) and germyl free radicals have been investigated. Reaction of a Ge(II) chloride with a lithium trialkylgermanide affords a germylene:

ArGeCl + LiGe(C(CH_{3})_{3})_{3} → ArGeGe((C(CH_{3})_{3})_{3} + LiCl (Ar = 2,6-(mesityl)_{2}C_{6}H_{3})

== Reactions of organogermanium compounds ==
Some organogermanium compounds participate in cross coupling reactions.

== Applications ==
Organogermanium compounds are used in relatively few commercial applications. Isobutylgermane, a volatile colorless liquid, is used in MOVPE (Metalorganic Vapor Phase Epitaxy) in the deposition of Ge semiconductor films.

Propagermanium, also known as Ge-132, and spirogermanium are drugs.
