= Germanium =

Germanium, _{32}Ge
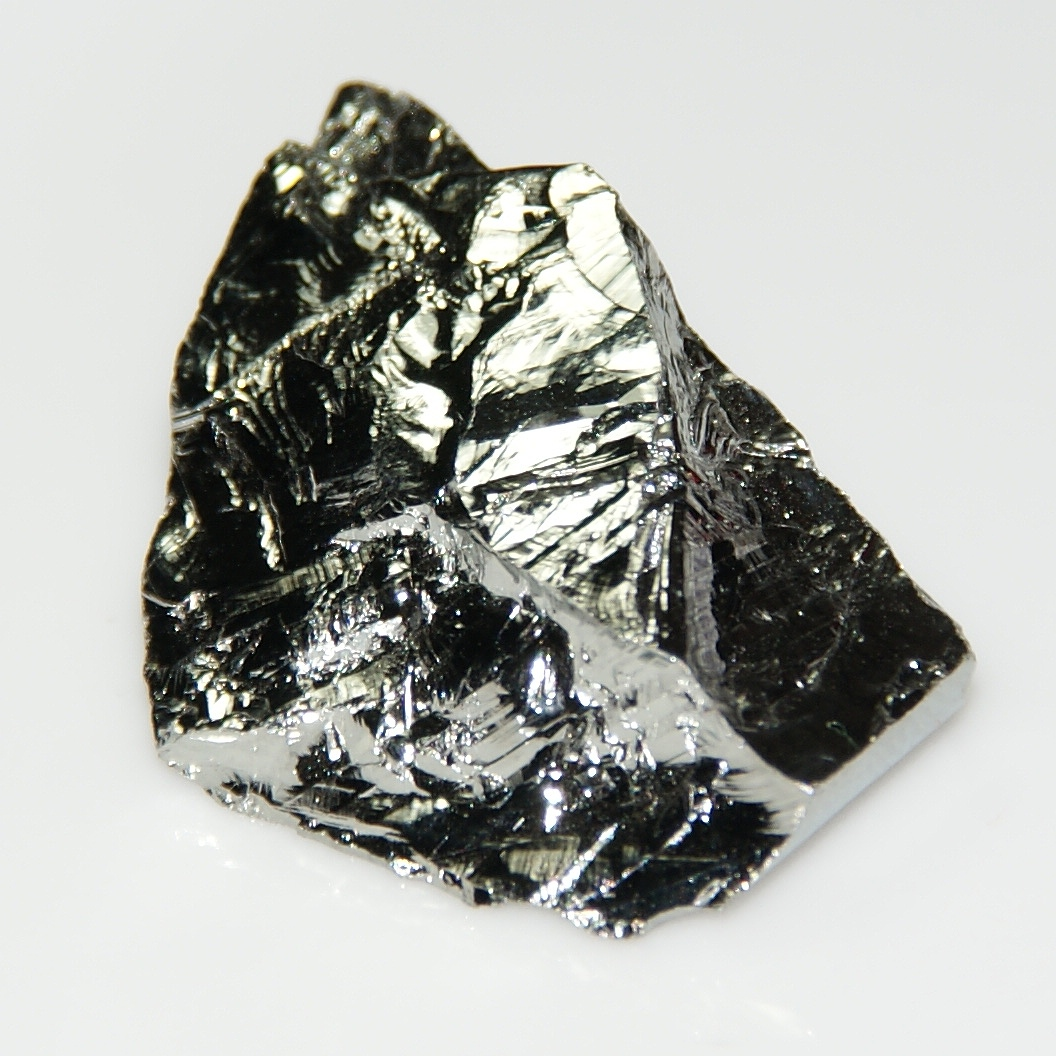

Germanium
- Pronunciation: /dʒərˈmeɪniəm/ (jər-MAY-nee-əm)
- Appearance: grayish-white

Standard atomic weight A_{r}°(Ge)
- 72.630±0.008; 72.630±0.008 (abridged)

Germanium in the periodic table
Hydrogen																															Helium
Lithium	Beryllium																									Boron	Carbon	Nitrogen	Oxygen	Fluorine	Neon
Sodium	Magnesium																									Aluminium	Silicon	Phosphorus	Sulfur	Chlorine	Argon
Potassium	Calcium															Scandium	Titanium	Vanadium	Chromium	Manganese	Iron	Cobalt	Nickel	Copper	Zinc	Gallium	Germanium	Arsenic	Selenium	Bromine	Krypton
Rubidium	Strontium															Yttrium	Zirconium	Niobium	Molybdenum	Technetium	Ruthenium	Rhodium	Palladium	Silver	Cadmium	Indium	Tin	Antimony	Tellurium	Iodine	Xenon
Caesium	Barium	Lanthanum	Cerium	Praseodymium	Neodymium	Promethium	Samarium	Europium	Gadolinium	Terbium	Dysprosium	Holmium	Erbium	Thulium	Ytterbium	Lutetium	Hafnium	Tantalum	Tungsten	Rhenium	Osmium	Iridium	Platinum	Gold	Mercury (element)	Thallium	Lead	Bismuth	Polonium	Astatine	Radon
Francium	Radium	Actinium	Thorium	Protactinium	Uranium	Neptunium	Plutonium	Americium	Curium	Berkelium	Californium	Einsteinium	Fermium	Mendelevium	Nobelium	Lawrencium	Rutherfordium	Dubnium	Seaborgium	Bohrium	Hassium	Meitnerium	Darmstadtium	Roentgenium	Copernicium	Nihonium	Flerovium	Moscovium	Livermorium	Tennessine	Oganesson
Si
↑
Ge
↓
Sn
gallium ← germanium → arsenic
- Atomic number (Z): 32
- Group: group 14 (carbon group)
- Period: period 4
- Block: p-block
- Electron configuration: [Ar] 3d^{10} 4s^{2} 4p^{2}
- Electrons per shell: 2, 8, 18, 4

Physical properties
- Phase at STP: solid
- Melting point: 1211.40 K (938.25 °C, 1720.85 °F)
- Boiling point: 3106 K (2833 °C, 5131 °F)
- Density (at 20° C): 5.327 g/cm^{3}
- when liquid (at m.p.): 5.60 g/cm^{3}
- Heat of fusion: 36.94 kJ/mol
- Heat of vaporization: 334 kJ/mol
- Molar heat capacity: 23.222 J/(mol·K)
- Specific heat capacity: 319.73 J/(kg·K)
Vapor pressure
P (Pa)	1	10	100	1 k	10 k	100 k
at T (K)	1644	1814	2023	2287	2633	3104

Atomic properties
- Oxidation states: common: −4, +2, +4 −3, −2, −1, 0, +1, +3
- Electronegativity: Pauling scale: 2.01
- Ionization energies: 1st: 762 kJ/mol; 2nd: 1537.5 kJ/mol; 3rd: 3302.1 kJ/mol
- Atomic radius: empirical: 122 pm
- Covalent radius: 122 pm
- Van der Waals radius: 211 pm
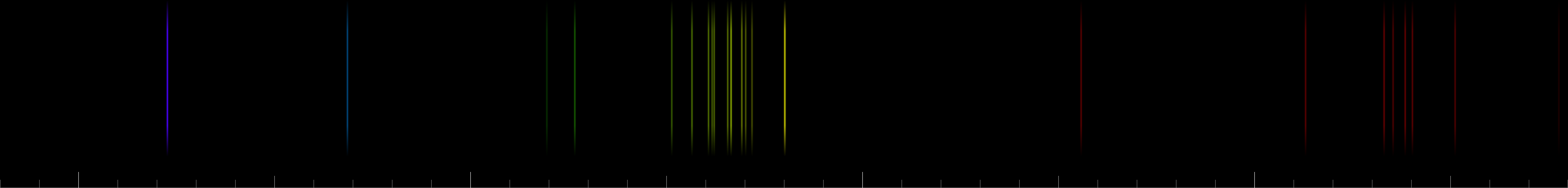
- Spectral lines of germanium

Other properties
- Natural occurrence: primordial
- Crystal structure: face-centered diamond-cubic (cF8)
- Lattice constant: a = 565.774 pm (at 20 °C)
- Thermal expansion: 5.79×10^{−6}/K (at 20 °C)
- Thermal conductivity: 60.2 W/(m⋅K)
- Electrical resistivity: 1 Ω⋅m (at 20 °C)
- Band gap: 0.67 eV (at 300 K)
- Magnetic ordering: diamagnetic
- Molar magnetic susceptibility: −76.84×10^{−6} cm^{3}/mol
- Young's modulus: 103 GPa
- Shear modulus: 41 GPa
- Bulk modulus: 75 GPa
- Speed of sound thin rod: 5400 m/s (at 20 °C)
- Poisson ratio: 0.26
- Mohs hardness: 6.0
- CAS Number: 7440-56-4

History
- Naming: after Germany, homeland of the discoverer
- Prediction: Dmitri Mendeleev (1869)
- Discovery: Clemens Winkler (1886)

Isotopes of germanium
Main isotopes			Decay	
Isotope	abundance	half-life (t_{1/2})	mode	product
^{68}Ge	synth	271.05 d	ε	^{68}Ga
^{70}Ge	20.52%	stable		
^{71}Ge	synth	11.468 d	ε	^{71}Ga
^{72}Ge	27.45%	stable		
^{73}Ge	7.76%	stable		
^{74}Ge	36.52%	stable		
^{76}Ge	7.75%	2.02×10^{21} y	β^{−}β^{−}	^{76}Se

Germanium is a chemical element; it has the symbol Ge and atomic number 32. It is lustrous, hard-brittle, grayish-white and similar in appearance to silicon. It is a metalloid (sometimes considered a nonmetal) in the carbon group that is chemically similar to silicon. Like silicon, germanium naturally reacts and forms complexes with oxygen in nature.

Because it seldom appears in high concentration, germanium was found comparatively late in the discovery of the elements. Germanium ranks 50th in abundance of the elements in the Earth's crust. In 1869, Dmitri Mendeleev predicted its existence and some of its properties from its position on his periodic table, and called the element ekasilicon. On February 6, 1886, Clemens Winkler at Freiberg University found the new element, along with silver and sulfur, in the mineral argyrodite. Winkler named the element after Germany, his country of birth. Germanium is mined primarily from sphalerite (the primary ore of zinc), though germanium is also recovered commercially from silver, lead, and copper ores.

Elemental germanium is used as a semiconductor in transistors and various other electronic devices. Historically, the first decade of semiconductor electronics was based entirely on germanium. Presently, the major end uses are fibre-optic systems, infrared optics, solar cell applications, and light-emitting diodes (LEDs). Germanium compounds are also used for polymerization catalysts and have most recently found use in the production of nanowires. This element forms a large number of organogermanium compounds, such as tetraethylgermanium, useful in organometallic chemistry.

Germanium is not thought to be an essential element for any living organism. Similar to silicon and aluminium, naturally occurring germanium compounds tend to be insoluble in water and thus have little oral toxicity. However, synthetic soluble germanium salts are nephrotoxic, and synthetic chemically reactive germanium compounds with halogens and hydrogen are irritants and toxins.

== History ==
Prediction of germanium, "?=70" (periodic table 1869)

In his report on The Periodic Law of the Chemical Elements in 1869, the Russian chemist Dmitri Mendeleev predicted the existence of several unknown chemical elements, including one that would fill a gap in the carbon family, located between silicon and tin. Because of its position in his periodic table, Mendeleev called it ekasilicon (Es), and he estimated its atomic weight to be 70 (later 72).

In mid-1885, at a mine near Freiberg, Saxony, a new mineral was discovered and named argyrodite because of its high silver content. (Note: From Greek, argyrodite means silver-containing.) The chemist Clemens Winkler analyzed this new mineral, which proved to be a combination of silver, sulfur, and a new element. Winkler was able to isolate the new element in 1886 and found it similar to antimony. He initially considered the new element to be eka-antimony, but was soon convinced that it was instead eka-silicon. Before Winkler published his results on the new element, he decided that he would name his element neptunium, since the recent discovery of planet Neptune in 1846 had similarly been preceded by mathematical predictions of its existence. (Note: Just as the existence of the new element had been predicted, the existence of the planet Neptune had been predicted in about 1843 by the two mathematicians John Couch Adams and Urbain Le Verrier, using the calculation methods of celestial mechanics. They did this in attempts to explain the fact that the planet Uranus, upon very close observation, appeared to be being pulled slightly out of position in the sky. James Challis started searching for it in July 1846, and he sighted this planet on September 23, 1846.) However, the name "neptunium" had already been given to another proposed chemical element (though not the element that today bears the name neptunium, which was discovered in 1940). (Note: R. Hermann published claims in 1877 of his discovery of a new element beneath tantalum in the periodic table, which he named neptunium, after the Greek god of the oceans and seas. However this metal was later recognized to be an alloy of the elements niobium and tantalum. The name "neptunium" was later given to the synthetic element one step past uranium in the Periodic Table, which was discovered by nuclear physics researchers in 1940.) So instead, Winkler named the new element germanium (from the Latin word, Germania, for Germany) in honor of his homeland. Argyrodite proved empirically to be Ag_{8}GeS_{6}. Because this new element showed some similarities with the elements arsenic and antimony, its proper place in the periodic table was under consideration, but its similarities with Dmitri Mendeleev's predicted element "ekasilicon" confirmed that place on the periodic table. With further material from 500 kg of ore from the mines in Saxony, Winkler confirmed the chemical properties of the new element in 1887. He also determined an atomic weight of 72.32 by analyzing pure germanium tetrachloride (GeCl_{4}), while Lecoq de Boisbaudran deduced 72.3 by a comparison of the lines in the spark spectrum of the element.

Winkler was able to prepare several new compounds of germanium, including fluorides, chlorides, sulfides, dioxide, and tetraethylgermane (Ge(C_{2}H_{5})_{4}), the first organogermane. The physical data from those compounds—which corresponded well with Mendeleev's predictions—made the discovery an important confirmation of Mendeleev's idea of element periodicity. Here is a comparison between the prediction and Winkler's data:

Property	Ekasilicon Mendeleev prediction (1871)	Germanium Winkler discovery (1887)
atomic mass	72.64	72.63
density (g/cm^{3})	5.5	5.35
melting point (°C)	high	947
color	gray	gray
oxide type	refractory dioxide	refractory dioxide
oxide density (g/cm^{3})	4.7	4.7
oxide activity	feebly basic	feebly basic
chloride boiling point (°C)	under 100	86 (GeCl_{4})
chloride density (g/cm^{3})	1.9	1.9

Until the late 1930s, germanium was thought to be a poorly conducting metal. Germanium did not become economically significant until after 1945 when its properties as an electronic semiconductor were recognized. During World War II, small amounts of germanium were used in some special electronic devices, mostly diodes. The first major use was the point-contact Schottky diodes for radar pulse detection during the War. The first silicon–germanium alloys were obtained in 1955. Before 1945, only a few hundred kilograms of germanium were produced in smelters each year, but by the end of the 1950s, the annual worldwide production had reached 40 tonnes (44 short tons).

The development of the germanium transistor in 1948 opened the door to countless applications of solid-state electronics. From 1950 through the early 1970s, this area provided an increasing market for germanium, but then high-purity silicon began replacing germanium in transistors, diodes, and rectifiers. For example, the company that became Fairchild Semiconductor was founded in 1957 with the express purpose of producing silicon transistors. Silicon has superior electrical properties, but it requires much greater purity that could not be commercially achieved in the early years of semiconductor electronics.

Meanwhile, the demand for germanium for fiber optic communication networks, infrared night vision systems, and polymerization catalysts increased dramatically. These end uses represented 85% of worldwide germanium consumption in 2000. The US government even designated germanium as a strategic and critical material, calling for a 146 ton (132 tonne) supply in the national defense stockpile in 1987.

Germanium differs from silicon in that the supply is limited by the availability of exploitable sources, while the supply of silicon is limited only by production capacity, since silicon comes from ordinary sand and quartz. While silicon could be bought in 1998 for less than $10 per kg, the price of germanium was almost $800 per kg.

== Characteristics ==
Under standard conditions, germanium is a brittle, silvery-white, semiconductor. This form constitutes an allotrope known as α-germanium, which has a metallic luster and a diamond cubic crystal structure, the same structure as silicon and diamond. In this form, germanium has a threshold displacement energy of 19.7+0.6
−0.5 eV. At pressures above 120 kbar, germanium becomes the metallic allotrope β-germanium with the same structure as β-tin. Like silicon, gallium, bismuth, antimony, and water, germanium is one of the few substances that expands as it solidifies (i.e. freezes) from the molten state.

Germanium is a semiconductor having an indirect bandgap, as is crystalline silicon. Zone refining techniques have led to the production of crystalline germanium for semiconductors that has an impurity of only one part in 10^{10}, making it one of the purest materials ever obtained. The first semi-metallic material discovered (in 2005) to become a superconductor in the presence of an extremely strong electromagnetic field was an alloy of germanium, uranium, and rhodium.

Pure germanium is known to spontaneously extrude very long screw dislocations, referred to as germanium whiskers. The growth of these whiskers is one of the primary reasons for the failure of older diodes and transistors made from germanium, as, depending on what they eventually touch, they may lead to an electrical short.

=== Chemistry ===
Elemental germanium starts to oxidize slowly in air at around 250 °C (482 °F), forming germanium dioxide (GeO_{2}). Germanium is insoluble in dilute acids and alkalis but dissolves slowly in hot concentrated sulfuric and nitric acids and reacts violently with molten alkalis to produce germanates (GeO^{2−}_{3}). Germanium occurs mostly in the oxidation state +4 although many +2 compounds are known. Other oxidation states are rare: +3 is found in compounds such as Ge_{2}Cl_{6}, and +3 and +1 are found on the surface of oxides, or negative oxidation states in germanides, such as −4 in Mg_{2}Ge. Germanium cluster anions (Zintl ions) such as Ge^{2−}_{4}, Ge^{4−}_{9}, Ge^{2−}_{9}, (Ge_{9})^{6−}_{2} have been prepared by the extraction from alloys containing alkali metals and germanium in liquid ammonia in the presence of ethylenediamine or a cryptand. The oxidation states of the element in these ions are not integers—similar to the ozonides (O^{−}_{3}).

Two oxides of germanium are known: germanium dioxide (GeO_{2}, germania) and germanium monoxide, (GeO). The dioxide can be obtained by roasting germanium disulfide (GeS_{2}), and is a white powder that is only slightly soluble in water but reacts with alkalis to form germanates. The monoxide, germanous oxide, can be obtained by the high temperature reaction of GeO_{2} with elemental Ge. The dioxide (and the related oxides and germanates) exhibits the unusual property of having a high refractive index for visible light, but transparency to infrared light. Bismuth germanate, Bi_{4}Ge_{3}O_{12} (BGO), is used as a scintillator.

Binary compounds with other chalcogens are also known, such as the disulfide (GeS_{2}) and diselenide (GeSe_{2}), and the monosulfide (GeS), monoselenide (GeSe), and monotelluride (GeTe). GeS_{2} forms as a white precipitate when hydrogen sulfide is passed through strongly acid solutions containing Ge(IV). The disulfide is appreciably soluble in water and in solutions of caustic alkalis or alkaline sulfides. Nevertheless, it is not soluble in acidic water, which allowed Winkler to discover the element. By heating the disulfide in a current of hydrogen, the monosulfide (GeS) is formed, which sublimes in thin plates of a dark color and metallic luster, and is soluble in solutions of the caustic alkalis. Upon melting with alkaline carbonates and sulfur, germanium compounds form salts known as thiogermanates.

Germane is similar to methane.

Four tetrahalides are known. Under normal conditions germanium tetraiodide (GeI_{4}) is a solid, germanium tetrafluoride (GeF_{4}) a gas and the others volatile liquids. For example, germanium tetrachloride, GeCl_{4}, is obtained as a colorless fuming liquid boiling at 83.1 °C (181.6 °F) by heating the metal with chlorine. All the tetrahalides are readily hydrolyzed to hydrated germanium dioxide. GeCl_{4} is used in the production of organogermanium compounds. All four dihalides are known and in contrast to the tetrahalides are polymeric solids. Additionally Ge_{2}Cl_{6} and some higher compounds of formula Ge_{n}Cl_{2n+2} are known. The unusual compound Ge_{6}Cl_{16} has been prepared that contains the Ge_{5}Cl_{12} unit with a neopentane structure.

Germane (GeH_{4}) is a compound similar in structure to methane. Polygermanes—compounds that are similar to alkanes—with formula Ge_{n}H_{2n+2} containing up to five germanium atoms are known. The germanes are less volatile and less reactive than their corresponding silicon analogues. GeH_{4} reacts with alkali metals in liquid ammonia to form white crystalline MGeH_{3} which contain the germyl (GeH^{−}_{3}) anion. The germanium hydrohalides with one, two and three halogen atoms are colorless reactive liquids.

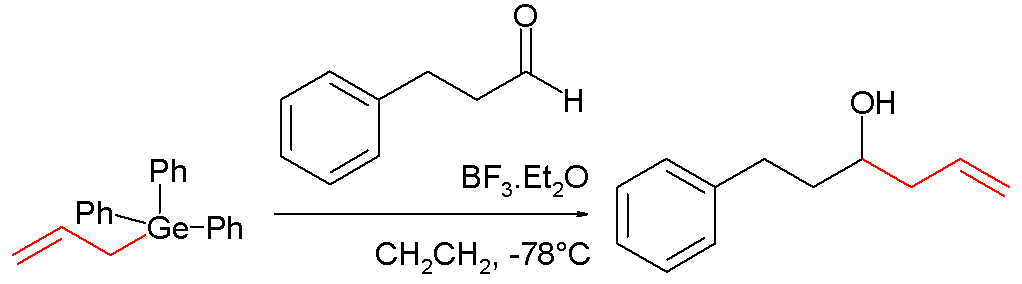
Nucleophilic addition with an organogermanium compound

The first organogermanium compound was synthesized by Winkler in 1887; the reaction of germanium tetrachloride with diethylzinc yielded tetraethylgermane (Ge(C_{2}H_{5})_{4}). Organogermanes of the type R_{4}Ge (where R is an alkyl) such as tetramethylgermane (Ge(CH_{3})_{4}) and tetraethylgermane are accessed through the cheapest available germanium precursor germanium tetrachloride and alkyl nucleophiles. Organic germanium hydrides such as isobutylgermane ((CH_{3})_{2}CHCH_{2}GeH_{3}) were found to be less hazardous and may be used as a liquid substitute for toxic germane gas in semiconductor applications. Many germanium reactive intermediates are known: germyl free radicals, germylenes (similar to carbenes), and germynes (similar to carbynes). The organogermanium compound 2-carboxyethylgermasesquioxane was first reported in the 1970s, and for a while was used as a dietary supplement and thought to possibly have anti-tumor qualities.

Using a ligand called Eind (1,1,3,3,5,5,7,7-octaethyl-s-hydrindacen-4-yl) germanium is able to form a double bond with oxygen (germanone).

=== Isotopes ===
Germanium occurs in five natural isotopes: ^{70}Ge, ^{72}Ge, ^{73}Ge, ^{74}Ge, and ^{76}Ge. Of these, ^{76}Ge is very slightly radioactive, undergoing double beta decay with a half-life of 2.02×10^{21} years. ^{74}Ge is the most common isotope, having a natural abundance of 36.52% and ^{76}Ge is the least common with a natural abundance of 7.75%.

Apart from ^{76}Ge, at least 27 other radioisotopes have been synthesized, ranging in atomic mass from 58 to 89. The most stable of these is ^{68}Ge, decaying by electron capture with a half-life of 270.95 d. This is followed by ^{71}Ge, also decaying by electron capture with half-life 11.468 d, and the rest are all less than two days, most under two hours.

=== Occurrence ===
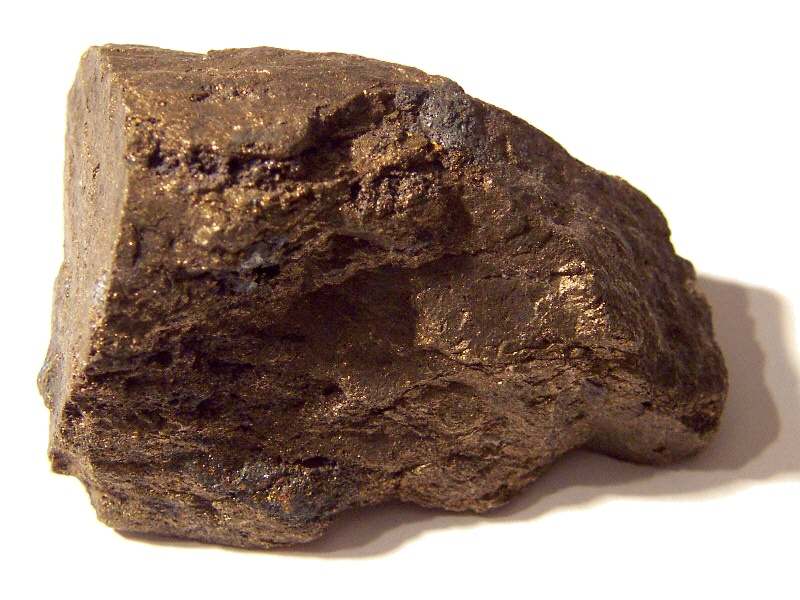
Renierite

Germanium is created by stellar nucleosynthesis, mostly by the s-process in asymptotic giant branch stars. The s-process is a slow neutron capture of lighter elements inside pulsating red giant stars. Germanium has been detected in some of the most distant stars and in the atmosphere of Jupiter.

Germanium's abundance in the Earth's crust is approximately 1.6 ppm. Only a few minerals like argyrodite, briartite, germanite, renierite and sphalerite contain appreciable amounts of germanium. Only few of them (especially germanite) are, very rarely, found in mineable amounts.

Some zinc–copper–lead ore bodies contain enough germanium to justify extraction from the final ore concentrate. An unusual natural enrichment process causes a high content of germanium in some coal seams, as discovered by Victor Moritz Goldschmidt during a broad survey for germanium deposits. The highest concentration ever found was in Hartley coal ash with as much as 1.6% germanium. The coal deposits near Xilinhaote, Inner Mongolia, contain an estimated 1,800 short tons (1,600 tonnes) of germanium.

== Production ==
Refined germanium production

About 118 tonnes of germanium were produced in 2011 worldwide, mostly in China (80 t), Russia (5 t) and United States (3 t). Germanium is recovered as a by-product from sphalerite zinc ores where it is concentrated in amounts as great as 0.3%, especially from low-temperature sediment-hosted, massive Zn–Pb–Cu(–Ba) deposits and carbonate-hosted Zn–Pb deposits. A recent study found that at least 10,000 t of extractable germanium is contained in known zinc reserves, particularly those hosted by Mississippi-Valley type deposits, while at least 112,000 t will be found in coal reserves. In 2007 35% of the demand was met by recycled germanium.

Year	Cost ($/kg)
1999	1,400
2000	1,250
2001	890
2002	620
2003	380
2004	600
2005	660
2006	880
2007	1,240
2008	1,490
2009	950
2010	940
2011	1,625
2012	1,680
2013	1,875
2014	1,900
2015	1,760
2016	950
2017	1,358
2018	1,300
2019	1,240
2020	1,000
2021	1187
2022	1294
2023	1392

While it is produced mainly from sphalerite, it is also found in silver, lead, and copper ores. Another source of germanium is fly ash of power plants fueled from coal deposits that contain germanium. Russia and China used this as a source for germanium. Russia's deposits are located in the far east of Sakhalin Island, and northeast of Vladivostok. The deposits in China are located mainly in the lignite mines near Lincang, Yunnan; coal is also mined near Xilinhaote, Inner Mongolia.

The ore concentrates are mostly sulfidic; they are converted to the oxides by heating under air in a process known as roasting:

GeS_{2} + 3 O_{2} → GeO_{2} + 2 SO_{2}

Some of the germanium is left in the dust produced, while the rest is converted to germanates, which are then leached (together with zinc) from the cinder by sulfuric acid. After neutralization, only the zinc stays in solution while germanium and other metals precipitate. After removing some of the zinc in the precipitate by the Waelz process, the residing Waelz oxide is leached a second time. The dioxide is obtained as precipitate and converted with chlorine gas or hydrochloric acid to germanium tetrachloride, which has a low boiling point and can be isolated by distillation:

GeO_{2} + 4 HCl → GeCl_{4} + 2 H_{2}O
GeO_{2} + 2 Cl_{2} → GeCl_{4} + O_{2}

Germanium tetrachloride is either hydrolyzed to the oxide (GeO_{2}) or purified by fractional distillation and then hydrolyzed. The highly pure GeO_{2} is now suitable for the production of germanium glass. It is reduced to the element by reacting it with hydrogen, producing germanium suitable for infrared optics and semiconductor production:

GeO_{2} + 2 H_{2} → Ge + 2 H_{2}O

The germanium for steel production and other industrial processes is normally reduced using carbon:

GeO_{2} + C → Ge + CO_{2}

=== Production by country ===
World refinery production of germanium (germanium content).

World refinery production / total supply (USGS), with country groups where available
Year	China (t)	Canada (t)	Russia (t)	Other (t)	U.S. refinery (t)	World total (t)	Comment	Source
1970					~15	~85		
1980			14		27	~115	USSR 14 (est.), Japan 13 t, France 10, Austria 5. Significant recovery also believed in Belgium, China, FRG, Italy.	
1990	10	-	12		18	~80	USSR 12 t, Japan 3 t, Austria 5 t	
1996					18	71.5	World total market supply ≈71.5 t (≈53 t primary refinery + 12 t recycling + 6.5 t stock releases)	
1999					20	91	World total market supply (58 t primary refinery + 25 t recycling + 8 t stock releases)	
2000					23	105	World total market supply (slightly >70 t primary refinery + 25 t recycling + 9 t stock releases)	
2001					20	110	World total market supply (~<70 t primary refinery + 30 t recycling + 12 t stock releases)	
2002					12	80	World total market supply (50 t primary refinery + 30 t recycling)	
2003					12	80	World total market supply (50 t primary refinery + 30 t recycling) - "Starting in 2001, there had been a growing surplus of germanium owing to a major downturn in the fiber optics market. By yearend 2003, supply and demand were in close balance"	
2004					4.4	87	World total market supply (50 t primary refinery + 30 t recycling + 7 t stock releases)	
2005					4.5	90	World total market supply (including 31 t recycling)	
2006					4.6	100	World total market supply (including 35 t recycling). "In 2006, production decreased, while consumption strongly rose, resulting in a deficit. Prices of germanium metal and germanium dioxide in 2007 had increased to record levels"	
2007					4.6	145	Including 6,902 kg released from the NDS. The recycling supplied about 30% of the world's total	
2008	~100	~27	~5	~2	4.6	~140	Worldwide, the vast majority of germanium production was concentrated in Canada and China	
2009	~100	~27	~5	~2	~6	100 - 120	Worldwide, primary germanium was recovered from copper or zinc residues or from coal in Canada (concentrates shipped from the United States), China (multiple sources), Finland (concentrates from Congo Kinshasa), and Russia (lignite coal from Sakhalin)	
2010	~77	~15	~4	~15	9.3	100 - 120	Other is mainly Finland	
2013	~107	~20	~4	~21	~4	~155	Other is mainly Finland	
2017	79.1	~35	5.0	~1	~4	124		
2020	95 - 105	~24	5.0	~3	~2	140		
2023	~200	~27	~7	~3	~2	243	"These estimates include both primary and secondary production."	

== Applications ==
Germanium usage (2023)
1. Fibre optics (26.0%)
2. Infrared optics (22.0%)
3. PET catalyst (20.0%)
4. Electronics (12.0%)
5. Solar (10.0%)
6. Gamma ray detectors (5.00%)
7. Other (5.00%)

The major global end uses for germanium were electronics and solar applications, fiber-optic systems, infrared optics, and polymerization catalysts. Other uses included chemotherapy, metallurgy, and phosphors.

=== Optics ===
A typical single-mode optical fiber. Germanium oxide is a dopant of the core silica (Item 1).: 1. Core 8 µm; 2. Cladding 125 µm; 3. Buffer 250 µm; 4. Jacket 400 µm

The notable properties of germania (GeO_{2}) are its high index of refraction and its low optical dispersion. These make it especially useful for wide-angle camera lenses, microscopy, and the core part of optical fibers. It has replaced titania as the dopant for silica fiber, eliminating the subsequent heat treatment that made the fibers brittle. At the end of 2002, the fiber optics industry consumed 60% of the annual germanium use in the United States, but this is less than 10% of worldwide consumption. GeSbTe is a phase change material used for its optic properties, such as that used in rewritable DVDs.

Because germanium is transparent in the infrared wavelengths, it is an important infrared optical material that can be readily cut and polished into lenses and windows. It is especially used as the front optic in thermal imaging cameras working in the 8 to 14 micron range for passive thermal imaging and for hot-spot detection in military, mobile night vision, and fire fighting applications. It is used in infrared spectroscopes and other optical equipment that require extremely sensitive infrared detectors. It has a very high refractive index (4.0) and must be coated with anti-reflection agents. Particularly, a very hard special antireflection coating of diamond-like carbon (DLC), refractive index 2.0, is a good match and produces a diamond-hard surface that can withstand much environmental abuse.

=== Electronics ===
Germanium can be alloyed with silicon. Silicon–germanium alloys can be a semiconductor material for high-speed integrated circuits. Circuits using the properties of Si-SiGe heterojunctions can be faster than those using silicon alone. The SiGe chips, with high-speed properties, can be made with low-cost and well-established production techniques of the silicon chip industry.

High efficiency solar panels are a major use of germanium. Because germanium and gallium arsenide have nearly identical lattice constant, germanium substrates can be used to make gallium-arsenide solar cells. Germanium is the substrate of the wafers for high-efficiency multijunction photovoltaic cells for space applications, such as the Mars Exploration Rovers, which use triple-junction gallium arsenide on germanium cells. High-brightness LEDs, used for automobile headlights and to backlight LCD screens, are also an important application.

Germanium-on-insulator (GeOI) substrates are seen as a potential replacement for silicon on miniaturized chips. CMOS circuit based on GeOI substrates has been reported recently. Other uses in electronics include phosphors in fluorescent lamps and solid-state light-emitting diodes (LEDs). Germanium transistors are still used in some effects pedals by musicians who wish to reproduce the distinctive tonal character of the "fuzz"-tone from the early rock and roll era, most notably the Dallas Arbiter Fuzz Face.

Germanium has been studied as a potential material for implantable bioelectronic sensors that are resorbed in the body without generating harmful hydrogen gas, replacing zinc oxide- and indium gallium zinc oxide-based implementations.

Germanium was also used to create many of the circuits found in some of the very first pieces of electronic musical gear, initially 1950s, primarily in early transistor-based circuits. The first guitar effects pedals in the 1960s – Fuzz pedals like the Maestro FZ-1 (1962), Dallas-Arbiter Fuzz Face (1966), and Tone Bender (1965) - used germanium transistors. Silicon diodes are more frequently used in more modern equipment, but germanium diodes are still used in some applications as they have lower barrier potential and smoother transconductance curves, leading to less harsh clipping.

=== Other uses ===
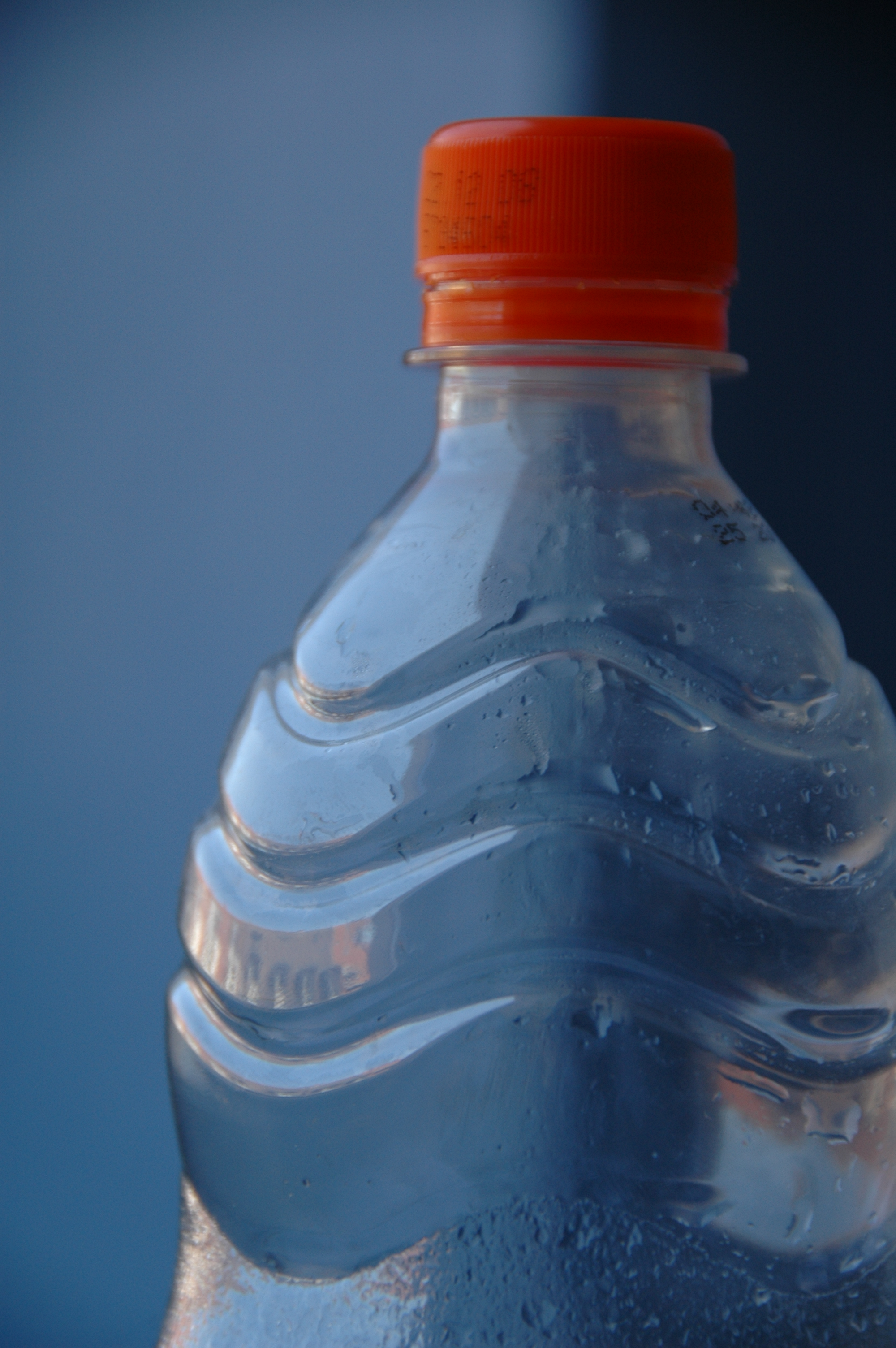
A PET bottle

Germanium dioxide is also used in catalysts for polymerization in the production of polyethylene terephthalate (PET). The high brilliance of this polyester is especially favored for PET bottles marketed in Japan. In the United States, germanium is not used for polymerization catalysts.

Due to the similarity between silica (SiO_{2}) and germanium dioxide (GeO_{2}), the silica stationary phase in some gas chromatography columns can be replaced by GeO_{2}.

In recent years germanium has seen increasing use in precious metal alloys. In sterling silver alloys, for instance, it reduces firescale, increases tarnish resistance, and improves precipitation hardening. A tarnish-proof silver alloy trademarked Argentium contains 1.2% germanium.

Semiconductor detectors made of single crystal high-purity germanium can precisely identify radiation sources—for example in airport security. Germanium is useful for monochromators for beamlines used in single crystal neutron scattering and synchrotron X-ray diffraction. The reflectivity has advantages over silicon in neutron and high energy X-ray applications. Crystals of high purity germanium are used in detectors for gamma spectroscopy and the search for dark matter. Germanium crystals are also used in X-ray spectrometers for the determination of phosphorus, chlorine and sulfur.

Germanium is emerging as an important material for spintronics and spin-based quantum computing applications. In 2010, researchers demonstrated room temperature spin transport and more recently donor electron spins in germanium has been shown to have very long coherence times.

== Germanium and health ==
Germanium is not considered essential to the health of plants or animals. Germanium in the environment has little or no health impact. This is primarily because it usually occurs only as a trace element in ores and carbonaceous materials, and the various industrial and electronic applications involve very small quantities that are not likely to be ingested. For similar reasons, end-use germanium has little impact on the environment as a biohazard. Some reactive intermediate compounds of germanium are poisonous (see precautions, below).

Germanium supplements, made from both organic and inorganic germanium, have been marketed as an alternative medicine capable of treating leukemia and lung cancer. There is, however, no medical evidence of benefit; some evidence suggests that such supplements are actively harmful. U.S. Food and Drug Administration (FDA) research has concluded that inorganic germanium, when used as a nutritional supplement, "presents potential human health hazard".

Some germanium compounds have been administered by alternative medical practitioners as non-FDA-allowed injectable solutions. Soluble inorganic forms of germanium used at first, notably the citrate-lactate salt, resulted in some cases of renal dysfunction, hepatic steatosis, and peripheral neuropathy in individuals using them over a long term. Plasma and urine germanium concentrations in these individuals, several of whom died, were several orders of magnitude greater than endogenous levels. A more recent organic form, beta-carboxyethylgermanium sesquioxide (propagermanium), has not exhibited the same spectrum of toxic effects.

Certain compounds of germanium have low toxicity to mammals, but have toxic effects against certain bacteria.

=== Precautions for chemically reactive germanium compounds ===
While use of germanium itself does not require precautions, some of germanium's artificially produced compounds are quite reactive and present an immediate hazard to human health on exposure. For example, germanium tetrachloride and germane (GeH_{4}) are a liquid and gas, respectively, that can be very irritating to the eyes, skin, lungs, and throat.

== See also ==
- Germanene
- Vitrain
- History of the transistor
