= Germanium diselenide =

Names
- Other names Germanium selenide Germanium(IV) selenide

Identifiers
CAS Number	12065-11-1
3D model (JSmol)	Interactive image
ChemSpider	74804
ECHA InfoCard	100.031.863
EC Number	235-063-5
PubChem CID	82903
CompTox Dashboard (EPA)	DTXSID9065237
- InChI: InChI=1S/GeSe2/c2-1-3 Key: WYDSCDJEAVCHQJ-UHFFFAOYSA-N
- SMILES: [Ge](=[Se])=[Se]

Properties
Chemical formula	GeSe_{2}
Molar mass	230.572 g·mol^{−1}
Appearance	yellow crystals
Density	4.56±0.02 g·cm^{−3}
Melting point	707±3 °C

Related compounds
Other anions	Germanium dioxide Germanium disulfide Germanium ditelluride
Other cations	Carbon diselenide Silicon diselenide Tin diselenide Lead diselenide
Related compounds	Germanium monoselenide
- Except where otherwise noted, data are given for materials in their standard state (at 25 °C [77 °F], 100 kPa). Infobox references

Germanium diselenide is an inorganic compound, with the chemical formula of GeSe_{2}.

== Preparation ==
Germanium diselenide is prepared by reacting stoichiometric amounts of germanium and selenium or by reacting germanium tetrachloride with hydrogen selenide:

Ge + 2Se → GeSe_{2}
GeCl_{4} + 2H_{2}Se → GeSe_{2} + 4HCl

== Properties ==
Germanium diselenide reacts with selenium and hydrazine to obtain yellow (N_{2}H_{5})_{4}Ge_{2}Se_{6}, a selenidogermanate.

2GeSe_{2} + 2Se + 5N_{2}H_{4} → (N_{2}H_{5})_{4}Ge_{2}Se_{6} + N_{2}

It reacts with lead selenide and gallium(III) selenide at high temperatures to obtain PbGa_{2}GeSe_{6}.
