= Canfieldite =

Silver tin sulfide mineral

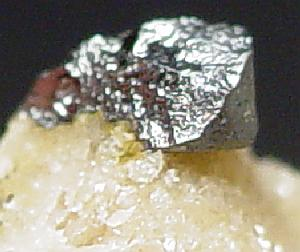
- Canfieldite

General
- Category: Sulfide minerals
- Formula: Ag_{8}SnS_{6}
- IMA symbol: Cfi
- Strunz classification: 2.BA.70
- Crystal system: Orthorhombic
- Crystal class: Pyramidal (mm2) (same H-M symbol)
- Space group: Pna2_{1}

Identification
- Color: Steel gray with reddish tint
- Fracture: Irregular/ uneven, conchoidal
- Tenacity: Brittle
- Mohs scale hardness: 2 1/2
- Luster: Metallic
- Streak: Greyish black
- Diaphaneity: Opaque
- Density: 6.2 – 6.3 g/cm^{3}

Canfieldite is a rare silver tin sulfide mineral with formula: Ag_{8}SnS_{6}. The mineral typically contains variable amounts of germanium substitution in the tin site and tellurium in the sulfur site. There is a complete series between canfieldite and its germanium analogue, argyrodite. It forms black orthorhombic crystals which often appear to be cubic in form due to twinning. The most typical form is as botryoidal rounded grape-like masses. Its Mohs hardness is 2.5 and the specific gravity is 6.28. Canfieldite exhibits conchoidal fracturing and no cleavage.

Canfieldite was first described in 1893 from an occurrence in Colquechaca, Potosí Department, Bolivia. It was named for Frederick Alexander Canfield (1849–1926), an American mining engineer.

== See also ==
- List of minerals
- List of minerals named after people
