= Germanium sulfide =

Germanium sulfide may refer to:

- Germanium(IV) sulfide GeS_{2}, also known as Germanium disulfide
- Germanium(II) sulfide GeS, a semiconductor also known as Germanium monosulfide
