= Germanium oxide =

Germanium oxide may refer to:

- Germanium dioxide, GeO_{2}, the best known and most commonly encountered oxide of germanium containing germanium(IV)
- Germanium monoxide, GeO, a stable but not well characterised compound containing germanium(II)
