= Germanium monosulfide =

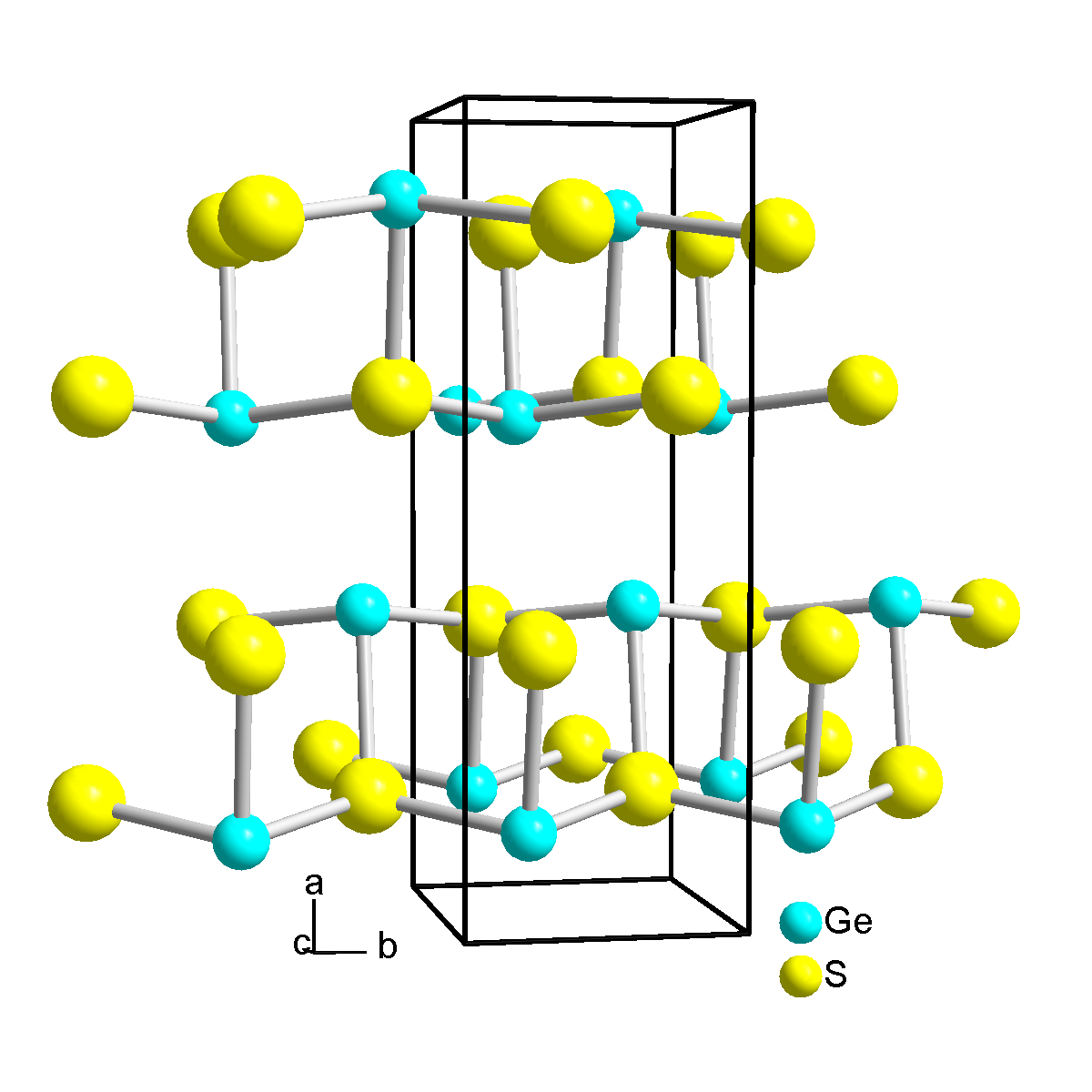

Names
- Systematic IUPAC name Germanium(II) sulfide

Identifiers
CAS Number	12025-32-0
3D model (JSmol)	Interactive image
ChemSpider	4897590
ECHA InfoCard	100.031.536
PubChem CID	6367215
CompTox Dashboard (EPA)	DTXSID20923282
- InChI: InChI=1S/GeS/c1-2 Key: VDNSGQQAZRMTCI-UHFFFAOYSA-N
- SMILES: S=[Ge]

Properties
Chemical formula	GeS
Molar mass	104.69 g·mol^{−1}

Related compounds
Related compounds	Carbon monosulfide Germanium monoxide Germanium disulfide
- Except where otherwise noted, data are given for materials in their standard state (at 25 °C [77 °F], 100 kPa). Infobox references

Germanium monosulfide or Germanium(II) sulfide is the chemical compound with the formula GeS. Germanium sulfide is a red-brown powder or black crystals. It hydrolyzes slowly in moist air but rapidly reacts in water forming Ge(OH)_{2} and then GeO. It is one of a few sulfides that can be sublimed under vacuum without decomposition. It also forms chalcogenide glasses and is a semiconductor.

== Preparation ==
First made by Winkler by reducing GeS_{2} with Ge. Other methods include reduction in a stream of H_{2} gas, or with an excess of H_{3}PO_{2} followed by vacuum sublimation.

== Structure ==
It has a layer structure similar to that of black phosphorus. The Ge-S distances range from 247 to 300 pm. Molecular GeS in the gas phase has a Ge-S bond length of 201.21 pm.
