= Germanium disulfide =

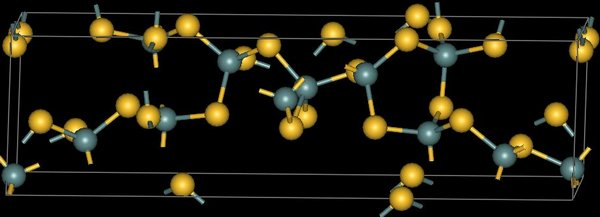
- Ball and stick model of crystalline germanium sulfide.

Names
- Systematic IUPAC name Germanium(IV) sulfide

Identifiers
CAS Number	12025-34-2
3D model (JSmol)	Interactive image
ChemSpider	74732
ECHA InfoCard	100.031.537
EC Number	234-705-1
PubChem CID	82816
CompTox Dashboard (EPA)	DTXSID2065177
- InChI: InChI=1S/GeS2/c2-1-3 Key: YIZVROFXIVWAAZ-UHFFFAOYSA-N; InChI=1/GeS2/c2-1-3 Key: YIZVROFXIVWAAZ-UHFFFAOYAU
- SMILES: S=[Ge]=S

Properties
Chemical formula	GeS_{2}
Molar mass	136.75 g·mol^{−1}
Appearance	White, translucent crystals
Density	2.94 g cm^{−3}
Melting point	840 °C (1,540 °F; 1,110 K)
Boiling point	1,530 °C (2,790 °F; 1,800 K)
Solubility in water	0.45 g/100 mL
Solubility	soluble in liquid ammonia
Magnetic susceptibility (χ)	−53.3·10^{−6} cm^{3}/mol

Structure
Crystal structure	monoclinic, mP36
Space group	Pc, No. 7
Coordination geometry	tetrahedral at Ge, bent at S

Thermochemistry
Heat capacity (C)	50 J /(mol K)
Std enthalpy of formation (Δ_{f}H^{⦵}_{298})	−150.06 kJ/mol

Related compounds
Related compounds	Carbon disulfide Germanium dioxide Germanium diselenide Germanium monosulfide Lead disulfide Silicon sulfide Tin disulfide
- Except where otherwise noted, data are given for materials in their standard state (at 25 °C [77 °F], 100 kPa). verify (what is ?) Infobox references

Germanium disulfide or Germanium(IV) sulfide is the inorganic compound with the formula GeS_{2}. It is a white high-melting crystalline solid. The compound is a 3-dimensional polymer, in contrast to silicon disulfide, which is a one-dimensional polymer. The Ge-S distance is 2.19 Å.

== Isolation, production, reactions ==
Germanium disulfide was first found in samples of argyrodite. The fact that germanium sulfide does not dissolve in aqueous acid facilitated its isolation.

Germanium disulfide is produced by treating a solution of germanium tetrachloride in a concentrated hydrochloric acid solution with hydrogen sulfide. It precipitates as a white solid.

It is insoluble in water, it dissolves in aqueous solutions of sodium sulfide owing to the formation of thiogermanates:

GeS_{2} + Na_{2}S → Na_{2}GeS_{3}

== Natural occurrence ==
Natural GeS_{2} is restricted to fumaroles of some burning coal-mining waste heaps.
