= Germanium chloride =

Germanium chloride may refer to:

- Germanium dichloride, germanium(II) chloride, GeCl_{2}
- Germanium tetrachloride, germanium(IV) chloride, GeCl_{4}

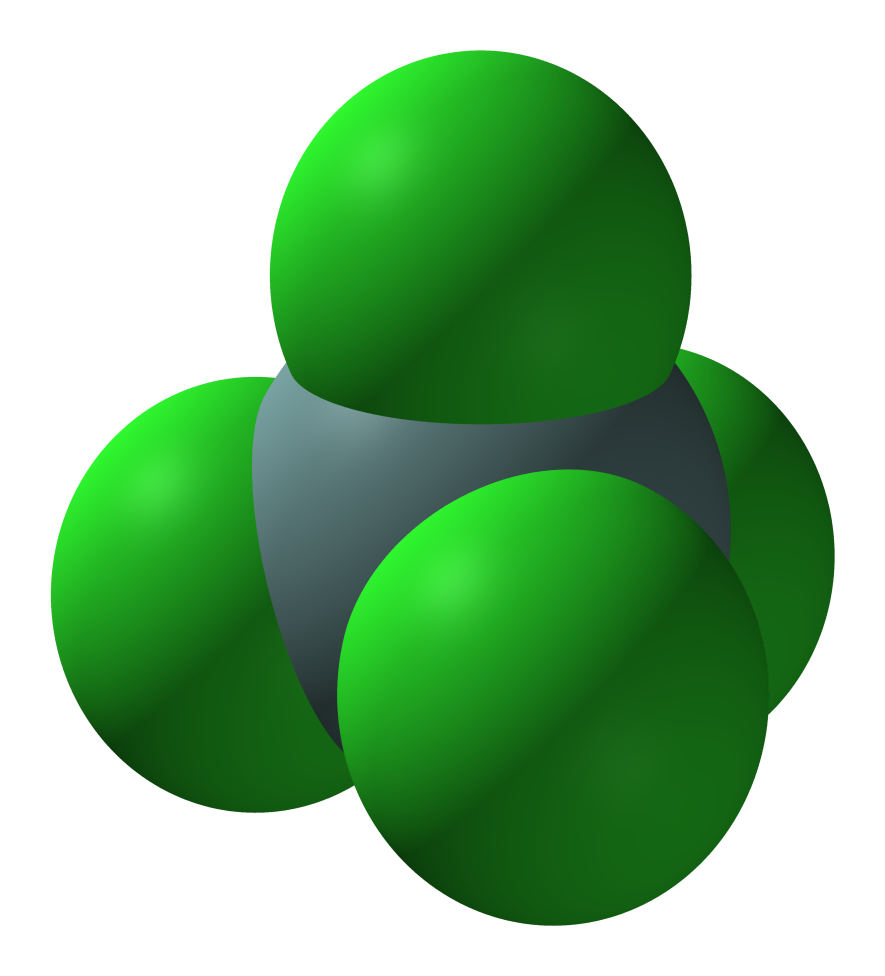
Germanium tetrachloride
