= Germanium fluoride =

Germanium fluoride is a chemical compound of germanium and fluorine which exists in the following forms:

- Germanium difluoride, GeF_{2}, a white ionic solid
- Germanium tetrafluoride, GeF_{4}, a colorless molecular gas
