= Germanite =

Rare copper iron germanium sulfide mineral

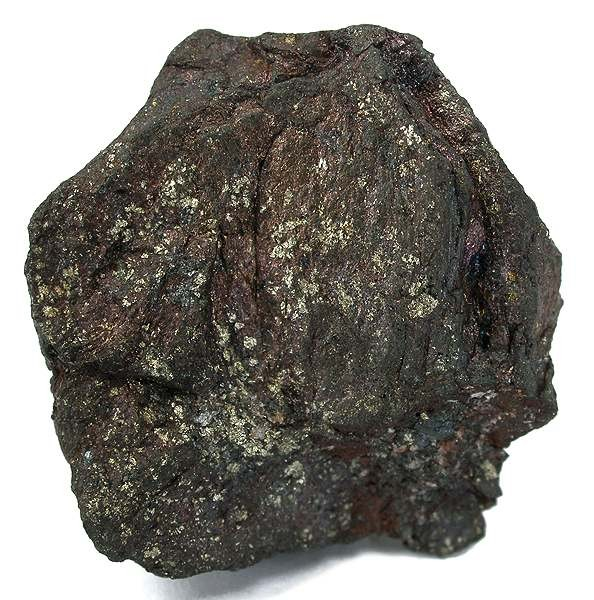
- Germanite, probably from the Tsumeb Mine, Oshikoto Region, Namibia.

General
- Category: Sulfide mineral
- Formula: Cu_{26}Ge_{4}Fe_{4}S_{32}
- IMA symbol: Ger
- Strunz classification: 2.CB.30
- Dana classification: 2.9.4.2
- Crystal system: Isometric
- Crystal class: Hextetrahedral (4̅3m); H-M symbol: (4̅ 3m)
- Space group: P4̅3n

Identification
- Color: Reddish grey tarnishing to dark brown
- Crystal habit: Usually massive; rarely as minute cubic crystals
- Cleavage: None
- Tenacity: Brittle
- Mohs scale hardness: 4
- Luster: Metallic
- Streak: Dark grey to black
- Diaphaneity: Opaque
- Specific gravity: 4.4 to 4.6
- Other characteristics: Cell data: a = 10.585 Å Z = 1

Germanite is a rare copper iron germanium sulfide mineral, Cu_{26}Fe_{4}Ge_{4}S_{32}. It was first discovered in 1922, and named for its germanium content. It is only a minor source of this important semiconductor element, which is mainly derived from the processing of the zinc sulfide mineral sphalerite. Germanite contains gallium, zinc, molybdenum, arsenic, and vanadium as impurities.

Its type locality is the Tsumeb Mine in Namibia where it occurs in a hydrothermal polymetallic ore deposit in dolomite in association with renierite, pyrite, tennantite, enargite, galena, sphalerite, digenite, bornite and chalcopyrite. It has also been reported from Argentina, Armenia, Bulgaria, Cuba, Democratic Republic of Congo (Zaire), Finland, France, Greece, Japan, Republic of Congo (Brazzaville), Russia and the United States.

X-Ray Powder Diffraction
d spacing	3.05	2.65	1.87	1.60	1.32	1.21	1.08	1.02
relative intensity	10	1	7	4	1	2	2	1
