= Argyrodite =

Sulfosalt mineral

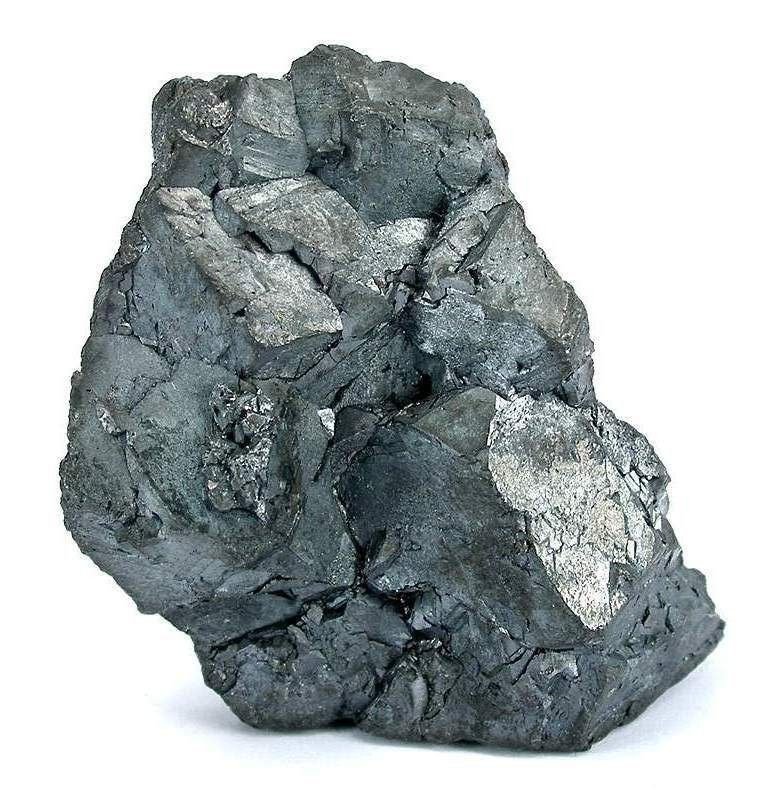

General
- Category: Sulfide mineral
- Formula: Ag_{8}GeS_{6}
- IMA symbol: Agy
- Strunz classification: 2.BA.35
- Crystal system: Orthorhombic
- Crystal class: Pyramidal (mm2); H-M symbol: (mm2)
- Space group: Pna2_{1}
- Unit cell: a = 15.149, b = 7.476 c = 10.589 [Å]; Z = 4

Identification
- Color: Black, purplish tinge
- Crystal habit: Pseudo-octahedra or pseudo-cubic, dodecahedra, cubes; radiating crystal aggregates, botryoidal crusts, or massive
- Twinning: Pseudospinel law {111} penetration twins
- Cleavage: Absent
- Fracture: Uneven to conchoidal
- Mohs scale hardness: 2.5
- Luster: Metallic
- Diaphaneity: Opaque
- Specific gravity: 6.2-6.5
- Optical properties: Weakly anisotropic
- Pleochroism: Weak

Argyrodite is an uncommon silver germanium sulfide mineral with formula Ag_{8}GeS_{6}. The color is iron-black with a purplish tinge, and the luster metallic.

Discovered and named by Albin Weisbach in 1886, it is of interest as it was the material from which Clemens Winkler isolated the element germanium, 15 years after it had been postulated by Mendeleev. It was first described for an occurrence in the Himmelsfürst Mine, Ore Mountains, Freiberg, Saxony, Germany.

The Freiberg mineral had previously been imperfectly described by August Breithaupt under the name "Plusinglanz", and Bolivian crystals were incorrectly described in 1849 as crystallized brongniardite.

Isomorphous with argyrodite is the corresponding tin bearing mineral Ag_{8}SnS_{6}, also found in Bolivia as pseudocubic crystals, and known by the name canfieldite. There is also a related mineral, putzite, with composition (Cu_{4.7}Ag_{3.3})GeS_{6}.

Argyrodite gets its name from the Greek words that loosely translate into "rich in silver".

== Argyrodite-type material ==
The term argyrodite is also used for other materials with a similar crystal structure, in particular lithium based argyrodite-type materials, which have received interest from researchers as a potential solid-state electrolyte for lithium-ion batteries.

They are considered to be of the form:

Li_{7-x}BCh_{6-x}X_{x}

With x between 0 and 1, B denoting either phosphorus or arsenic, Ch for sulfur or selenium and X for chlorine, bromine or iodine. However, other forms exist and can be grouped into three main categories, halogen-based argyrodites, halogen-based argyrodites doped with additional semi-metal or metal components and halogen-free argyrodites based on Li, P, S along with a semi-metal.
