= Propagermanium =

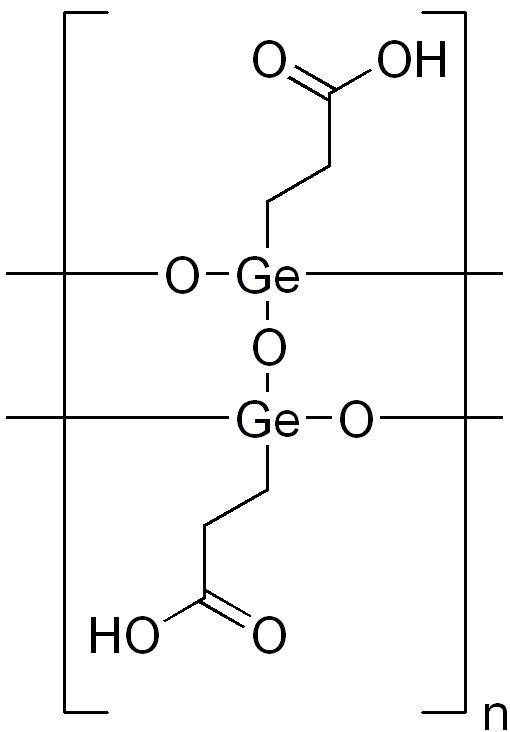

Names
- IUPAC name 3-[(2-Carboxyethyl-oxogermyl)oxy-oxogermyl]propanoic acid
- Other names proxigermanium, Ge-132, germanium sesquioxide, 2-carboxyethylgermasesquioxane, SK-818, bis(2-carboxyethylgermanium) sesquioxide

Identifiers
CAS Number	12758-40-6
3D model (JSmol)	Interactive image
ChEBI	CHEBI:32060
ChemSpider	74907
ECHA InfoCard	100.032.533
EC Number	235-800-0
KEGG	C13086; D01626
PubChem CID	83030
UNII	1Q2P9TO9Q7
CompTox Dashboard (EPA)	DTXSID9065316
- InChI: InChI=1S/C6H10Ge2O7/c9-5(10)1-3-7(13)15-8(14)4-2-6(11)12/h1-4H2,(H,9,10)(H,11,12) Key: XEABSBMNTNXEJM-UHFFFAOYSA-N
- SMILES: C(C[Ge](=O)O[Ge](=O)CCC(=O)O)C(=O)O

Properties
Chemical formula	C_{6}H_{10}O_{7}Ge_{2}
Molar mass	339.4222 g/mol

Hazards
- GHS labelling
Pictograms	(GHS07: Exclamation mark)
Signal word	Warning
Hazard statements	H315, H319, H335
Precautionary statements	P261, P264, P264+P265, P271, P280, P302+P352, P304+P340, P305+P351+P338, P319, P321, P332+P317, P337+P317, P362+P364, P403+P233, P405, P501
- Except where otherwise noted, data are given for materials in their standard state (at 25 °C [77 °F], 100 kPa). verify (what is ?) Infobox references

Propagermanium (INN), also known by a variety of other names including bis(2-carboxyethylgermanium) sesquioxide and 2-carboxyethylgermasesquioxane, is an organometallic compound of germanium that is sold as an alternative medicine. It is a polymeric compound with the formula ((HOOCCH_{2}CH_{2}Ge)_{2}O_{3})_{n}.

The compound was first synthesized in 1967 at the Asai Germanium Research Institute in Japan. It is a water-soluble organogermanium compound used as raw material in nutritional supplements. The compound displays low toxicity in studies with rats.
