= Renierite =

Rare copper zinc germanium bearing sulfide mineral

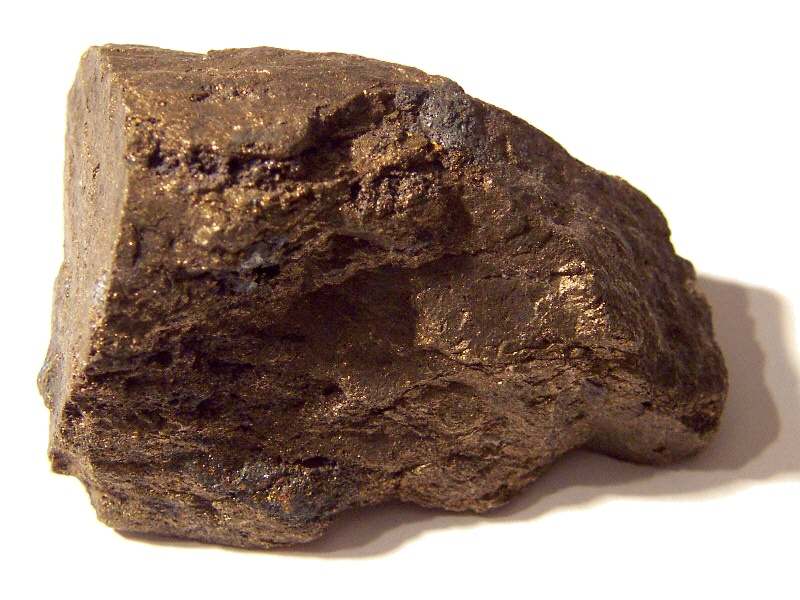

General
- Category: Sulfide mineral
- Formula: (Cu,Zn)_{11}(Ge,As)_{2}Fe_{4}S_{16}
- IMA symbol: Ren
- Strunz classification: 2.CB.35a
- Crystal system: Tetragonal
- Crystal class: Scalenohedral (4̅2m); H-M symbol: (4̅ 2m)
- Space group: P4̅2c

Identification
- Color: bronze yellow, pinkish brown
- Crystal habit: granular
- Cleavage: absent
- Fracture: Uneven
- Mohs scale hardness: 4.5
- Luster: metallic
- Streak: dark gray
- Specific gravity: 4.4
- Refractive index: opaque

Renierite is a rare copper zinc germanium bearing sulfide mineral with the chemical formula (Cu,Zn)_{11}(Ge,As)_{2}Fe_{4}S_{16}. It occurs at the Kipushi Mine, Democratic Republic of the Congo; and Namibia, among other places.

Renierite was named after Armand Renier (26 June 1876 – 9 October 1951), a Belgian geologist and director of the Belgian Geological Survey.
