= Uranium rhodium germanium =

Uranium rhodium germanium (URhGe) is the first discovered metal that becomes superconducting in the presence of an extremely strong electromagnetic field. Very unlike other superconducting materials, whose superconducting properties can be lost due to strong magnetic fields, uranium rhodium germanium regains superconducting abilities at about 8 teslas.

== Process ==
URhGe's critical temperature (T_{c}) is normally about 280 millikelvins.

The Grenoble team in France, headed by Andrew D. Huxley, first cooled down the sample below its critical temperature and raised the magnetic field to 2 T. As expected, the sample's superconducting properties vanished. However, when the team raised the magnetic field to 8 T, the superconducting behavior reemerged. The critical temperature at that field strength increased to about 400 millikelvins. The sample retained the superconducting state until 13 T. They also found that at 12 T, the URhGe sample experienced a magnetic phase transition.
