= Clemens Winkler =

German chemist who discovered germanium (1838–1904)

Clemens Alexander Winkler
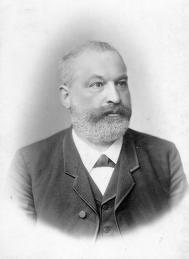
- Clemens Alexander Winkler
- Born: December 26, 1838; Freiberg, Kingdom of Saxony
- Died: October 8, 1904 (aged 65); Dresden, Germany
- Education: Freiberg University of Mining and Technology 1859, University of Leipzig 1864
- Scientific career
- Workplaces: Blaufarbenwerk Niederpfannenstiel, Freiberg University of Mining and Technology

Clemens Alexander Winkler (December 26, 1838 – October 8, 1904) was a German chemist who discovered the element germanium in 1886, solidifying Dmitri Mendeleev's theory of periodicity.

== Life ==
Winkler was born in 1838 in Freiberg, Kingdom of Saxony the son of a chemist who had studied under Berzelius. Winkler's early education was at schools in Freiberg, Dresden, and Chemnitz. In 1857 he entered the Freiberg University of Mining and Technology, where his knowledge of analytical chemistry surpassed what he was being taught there. Sixteen years later, Winkler was appointed a professor of chemical technology and analytical chemistry at the university.

Winkler was elected a member of the Royal Swedish Academy of Sciences in 1892.

In 1902, Winkler resigned his professorship. He died in Dresden two years later of carcinoma at the age of 65.

According to Brunck, Winkler wrote poetry, and according to McCay, Winkler's talents extended to playing several musical instruments.

== Discovery of germanium ==
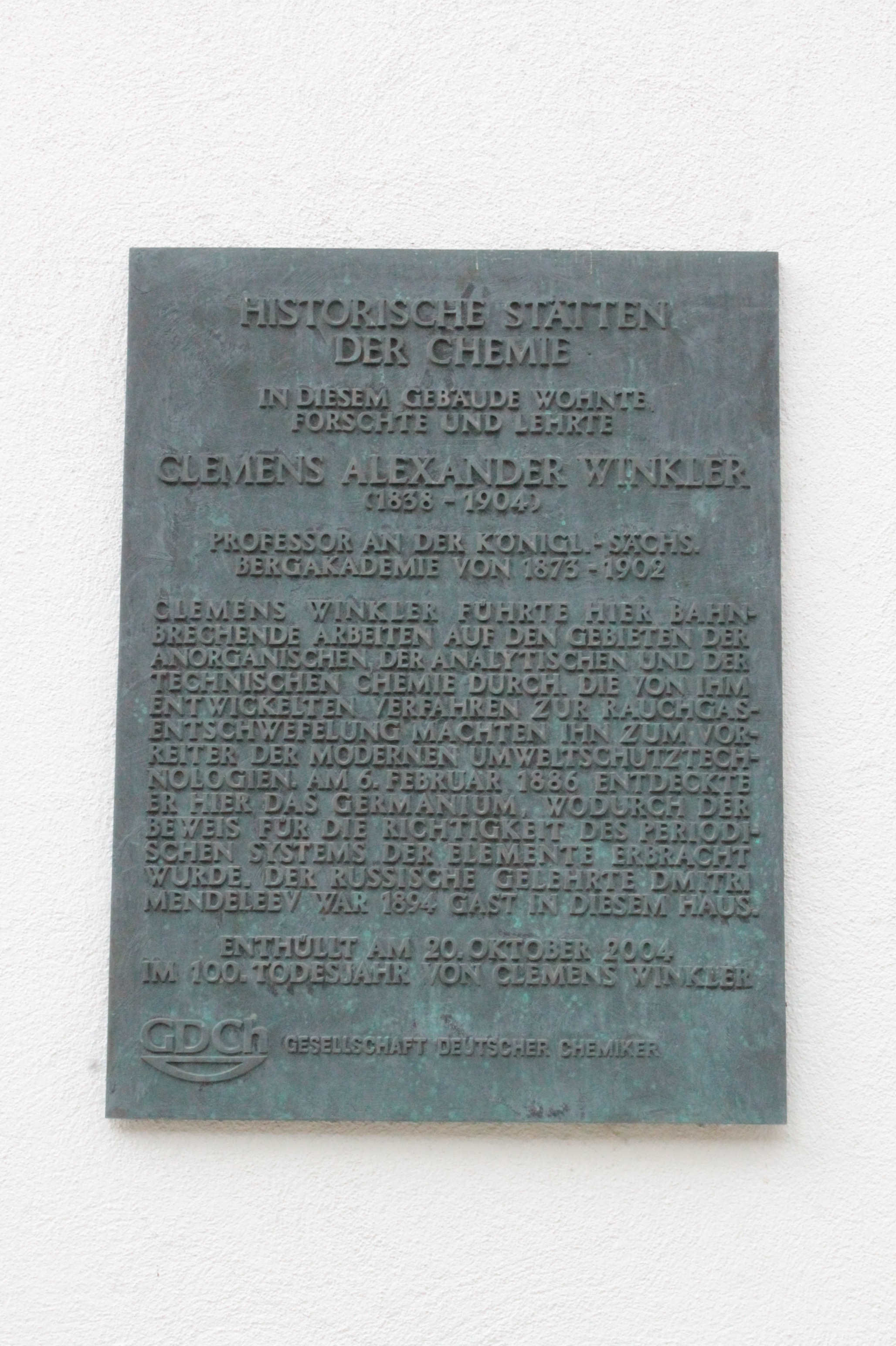
Plaque to Clemens Winkler in Freiburg, Germany

In 1886, Winkler was provided with a new mineral from the Himmelsfürst mine near Freiberg. The mineral, called argyrodite, was found by chemists to contain silver and sulfur. When Winkler subsequently analyzed the mineral, he found that the individual components only added up to about 93–94% of its total mass, leading him to suspect that a new and previously unknown element must be present. After additional chemical purification steps over several months, Winkler isolated the pure element, germanium, on February 6, 1886 and published his results. The mineral argyrodite that was Winkler's start toward finding germanium is now known to be a double sulfide with formula GeS_{2} · 4Ag_{2}S.

To place germanium into the periodic table, Mendeleev suggested that it might be ekacadmium, an element he had predicted earlier. In contrast, Lothar Meyer favored an identification of germanium with ekasilicon, a different predicted element. Winkler isolated more of the pure material, and eventually obtained enough to measure some of its physical and chemical properties. His results showed unequivocally that Meyer's interpretation was the correct one and that nearly all of the new element's properties matched Mendeleev predictions. The close match between what had been predicted for ekasilicon and what was found for germanium was clear evidence for the utility and power of the periodic table and the concept of periodicity.

== Other work ==
In addition to his isolation and study of germanium, Winkler investigated the analysis of gases. He published a book on the subject, Handbook of Technical Gas Analysis, in 1884. In that book Winkler describes his invention of the three-way stopcock. He predicted the existence of silicon monoxide, SiO, and was the first to attempt to produce it by heating silica with silicon in 1890. However, he was unsuccessful because he was not able to heat the mixture to a high enough temperature using a combustion furnace. As no reaction occurred for him, Winkler incorrectly concluded that SiO does not exist, even though it was reported to have formed from the reduction of silica with charcoal three years earlier by C. F. Maybery. However, Henry Noel Potter, a Westinghouse engineer, repeated Winkler's experiment fifteen years later with an electric furnace, which enabled him to increase the reaction temperature by several hundred degrees and observe the generation of SiO.

== See also ==
- German inventors and discoverers
