= Vitrain =

Lithotype of coal

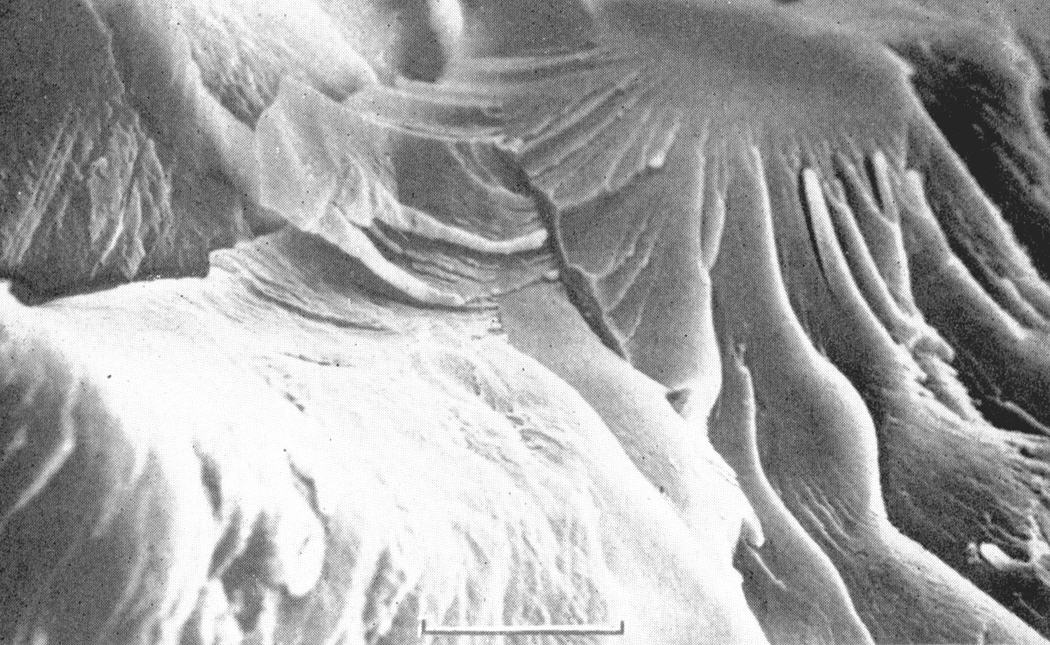
The surface of a vitrain fragment isolated from low-carbon coal viewed under a microscope (x2000 magnification)

Vitrain is a lithotype of coal formed from the bark of large plants. Known for its glossy appearance, vitrain typically occurs in thin bands, between 3 and 10 millimeters in width. It has a brittle texture and typically forms cubical pieces when broken. Chemically, vitrain stands out among coal lithotypes by hosting large concentrations of germanium. Combustion of vitrain proves a vital source of germanium production, where the element can be extracted from the leftover ash.
