= Germanium dioxide =

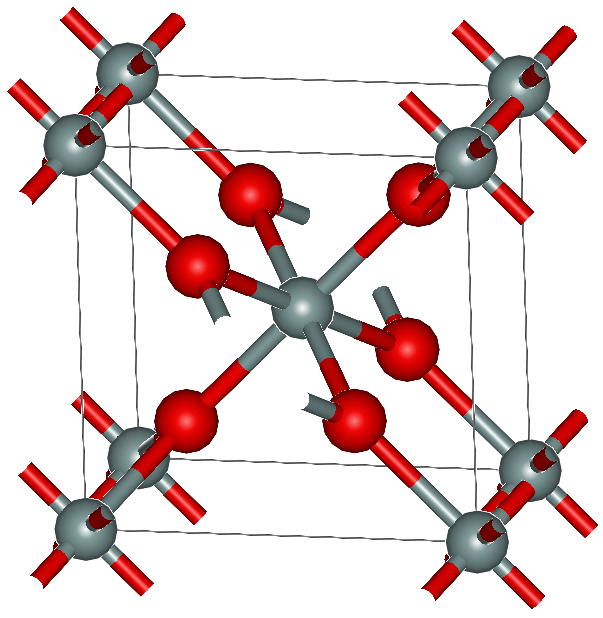
Tetragonal rutile form
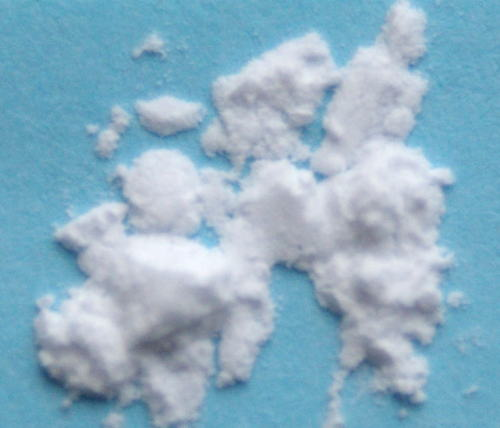

Names
- IUPAC name Germanium dioxide
- Other names Germanium(IV) oxide Germania; ACC10380; G-15; Neutral germanium oxide (1:2); Germanic oxide Salt of germanium

Identifiers
CAS Number	1310-53-8
3D model (JSmol)	Interactive image
ChemSpider	14112
ECHA InfoCard	100.013.801
PubChem CID	14796
RTECS number	LY5240000
UNII	5O6CM4W76A
CompTox Dashboard (EPA)	DTXSID0051653
- InChI: InChI=1S/GeO2/c2-1-3 Key: YBMRDBCBODYGJE-UHFFFAOYSA-N; InChI=1/GeO2/c2-1-3 Key: YBMRDBCBODYGJE-UHFFFAOYAG
- SMILES: O=[Ge]=O

Properties
Chemical formula	GeO_{2}
Molar mass	104.6388 g/mol
Appearance	White powder or colourless crystals
Density	4.228 g/cm^{3}
Melting point	1,115 °C (2,039 °F; 1,388 K)
Solubility in water	4.47 g/L (25 °C); 10.7 g/L (100 °C)
Solubility	Soluble in HF, insoluble in other acid. Soluble in strong alkaline conditions.
Magnetic susceptibility (χ)	−34.3·10^{−6} cm^{3}/mol
Refractive index (n_{D})	1.650

Structure
Crystal structure	Hexagonal

Hazards
NFPA 704 (fire diamond)	1 0 0
Flash point	Non-flammable
- Lethal dose or concentration (LD, LC)
LD_{50} (median dose)	3700 mg/kg (rat, oral)

Related compounds
Other anions	Germanium disulfide Germanium diselenide
Other cations	Carbon dioxide Silicon dioxide Tin dioxide Lead dioxide
Related compounds	Germanium monoxide
- Except where otherwise noted, data are given for materials in their standard state (at 25 °C [77 °F], 100 kPa). verify (what is ?) Infobox references

Germanium dioxide, also called germanium(IV) oxide, germania, and salt of germanium, is an inorganic compound with the chemical formula GeO_{2}. It is the main commercial source of germanium. It also forms as a passivation layer on pure germanium in contact with atmospheric oxygen.

== Structure ==
The two predominant polymorphs of GeO_{2} are hexagonal and tetragonal. Hexagonal GeO_{2} has the same structure as α-quartz, with germanium having coordination number 4. Tetragonal GeO_{2} (the mineral argutite) has the rutile-like structure seen in stishovite. In this motif, germanium has the coordination number 6. An amorphous (glassy) form of GeO_{2} is similar to fused silica.

Germanium dioxide can be prepared in both crystalline and amorphous forms. At ambient pressure the amorphous structure is formed by a network of GeO_{4} tetrahedra. At elevated pressure up to approximately 9 GPa the germanium average coordination number steadily increases from 4 to around 5 with a corresponding increase in the Ge–O bond distance. At higher pressures, up to approximately 15 GPa, the germanium coordination number increases to 6, and the dense network structure is composed of GeO_{6} octahedra. When the pressure is subsequently reduced, the structure reverts to the tetrahedral form. At high pressure, the rutile form converts to an orthorhombic CaCl_{2} form.

== Reactions ==
Heating germanium dioxide with powdered germanium at 1000 °C forms germanium monoxide (GeO).

The hexagonal (d = 4.29 g/cm^{3}) form of germanium dioxide is more soluble than the rutile (d = 6.27 g/cm^{3}) form and dissolves to form germanic acid, H_{4}GeO_{4}, or Ge(OH)_{4}. GeO_{2} is only slightly soluble in acid but dissolves more readily in alkali to give germanates. The germanic acid forms stable complexes with di- and polyfunctional carboxylic acids, poly-alcohols, and o-diphenols.

In contact with hydrochloric acid, it releases the volatile and corrosive germanium tetrachloride.

== Uses ==
The refractive index (1.7) and optical dispersion properties of germanium dioxide make it useful as an optical material for wide-angle lenses, in optical microscope objective lenses, and for the core of fiber-optic lines. See Optical fiber for specifics on the manufacturing process. Both germanium and its glass oxide, GeO_{2}, are transparent to the infrared (IR) spectrum. The glass can be manufactured into IR windows and lenses, used for night-vision technology in the military, luxury vehicles, and thermographic cameras. GeO_{2} is preferred over other IR transparent glasses because it is mechanically strong and therefore preferred for rugged military usage.

A mixture of silicon dioxide and germanium dioxide ("silica-germania") is used as an optical material for optical fibers and optical waveguides. Controlling the ratio of the elements allows precise control of refractive index. Silica-germania glasses have lower viscosity and higher refractive index than pure silica. Germania replaced titania as the silica dopant for silica fiber, eliminating the need for subsequent heat treatment, which made the fibers brittle.

Germanium dioxide is used as a colorant in borosilicate glass, used in lampworking. When combined with copper oxide, it provides a more stable red. It gives the glass a very reactive/changeable color, "a wonderful rainbow effect" when combined with silver oxide, that can shift light amber to a somewhat reddish and even deep purple appearance. The color can vary based on flame chemistry of the flame used to melt the glass (whether it has more oxygen or whether it has more fuel) And also it can change colors depending on the temperature of the kiln used to anneal the glass.

Germanium dioxide is also used as a catalyst in production of polyethylene terephthalate resin, and for production of other germanium compounds. It is used as a feedstock for production of some phosphors and semiconductor materials.

Germanium dioxide is used in algaculture as an inhibitor of unwanted diatom growth in algal cultures, since contamination with the comparatively fast-growing diatoms often inhibits the growth of or outcompetes the original algae strains. GeO_{2} is readily taken up by diatoms and leads to silicon being substituted by germanium in biochemical processes within the diatoms, causing a significant reduction of the diatoms' growth rate or even their complete elimination, with little effect on non-diatom algal species. For this application, the concentration of germanium dioxide typically used in the culture medium is between 1 and 10 mg/L, depending on the stage of the contamination and the species.

== Toxicity and medical ==
Germanium dioxide has low toxicity, but it is nephrotoxic in higher doses.

Germanium dioxide is used as a germanium supplement in some questionable dietary supplements and "miracle cures". High doses of these resulted in several cases of germanium poisonings.
