= Germanium monoxide =

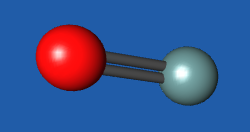

Names
- IUPAC name germanium(II) oxide
- Other names germanous oxide

Identifiers
CAS Number	20619-16-3
3D model (JSmol)	Interactive image
ChemSpider	4886101
ECHA InfoCard	100.039.914
PubChem CID	6327639
- InChI: InChI=1S/GeO/c1-2 Key: PVADDRMAFCOOPC-UHFFFAOYSA-N
- SMILES: [Ge]=O

Properties
Chemical formula	GeO
Molar mass	88.6394 g/mol
Magnetic susceptibility (χ)	−28.8·10^{−6} cm^{3}/mol
- Except where otherwise noted, data are given for materials in their standard state (at 25 °C [77 °F], 100 kPa). verify (what is ?) Infobox references

Germanium monoxide (chemical formula GeO) is a chemical compound of germanium and oxygen. It can be prepared as a yellow sublimate at 1000 °C by reacting GeO_{2} with Ge metal. The yellow sublimate turns brown on heating to 650 °C. GeO is not well characterised. It is amphoteric, dissolving in acids to form germanium(II) salts and in alkali to form "trihydroxogermanates" or "germanites" containing the Ge(OH)_{3}^{−} ion.

== Chemistry ==
Germanium oxide decomposes to Ge and GeO_{2}.

== See also ==
- Germanium dioxide
