= Germanium tetrachloride =

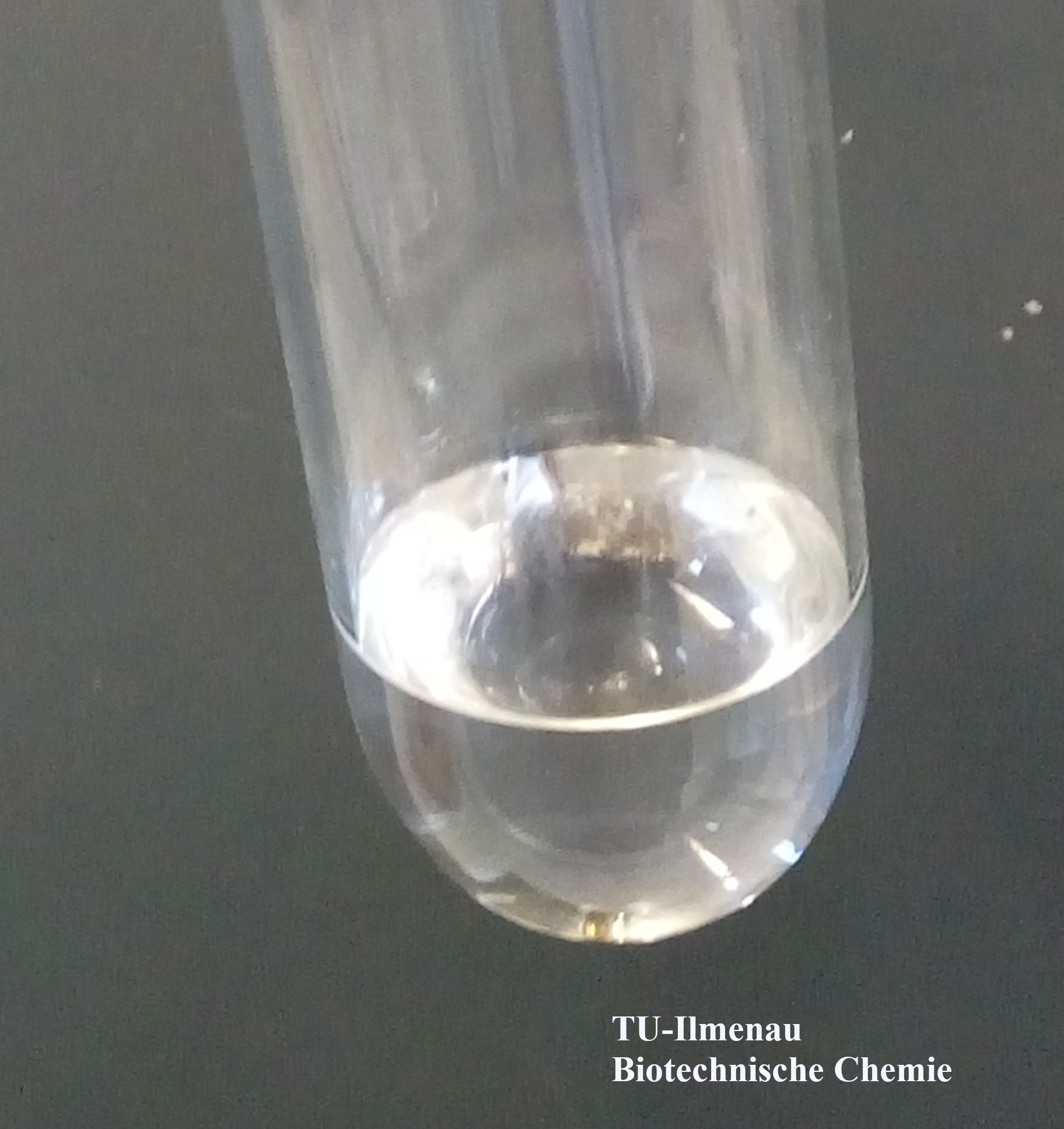

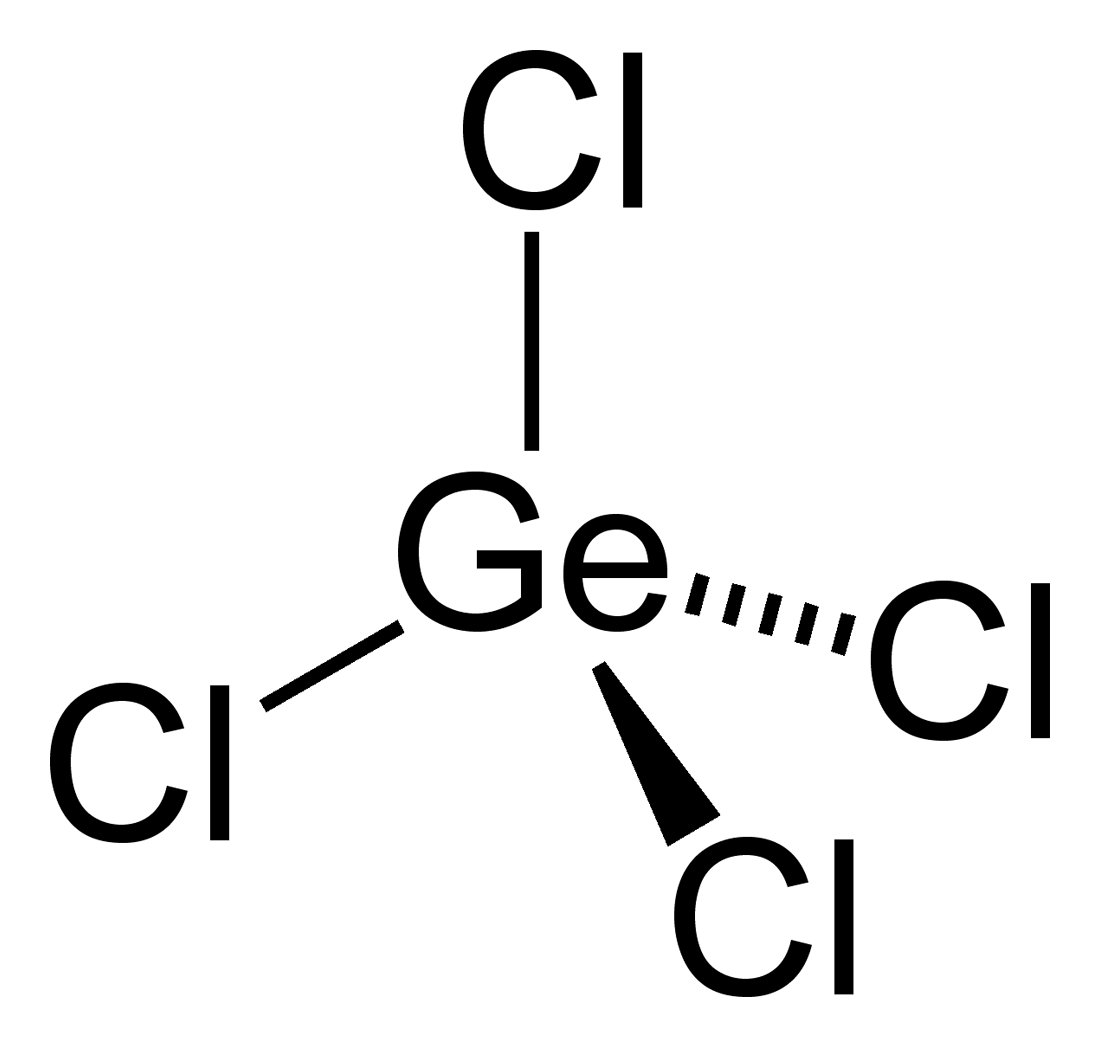
Germanium tetrachloride - structural formula
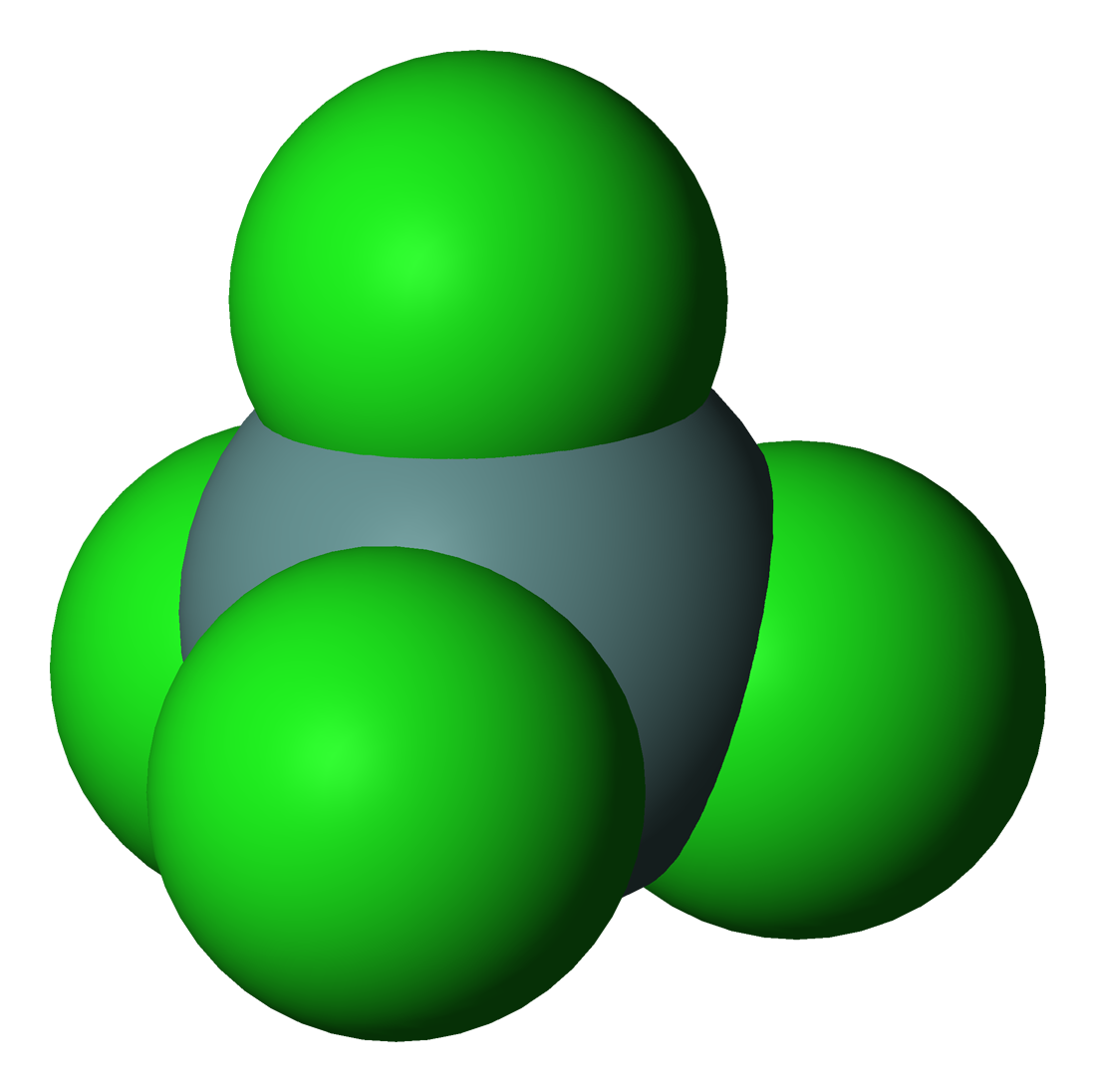
Germanium tetrachloride - space-filling model

Names
- IUPAC names Germanium tetrachloride Tetrachlorogermane; Tetrachloridogermanium
- Other names Germanium(IV) chloride Neutral germanium chloride (1:4)

Identifiers
CAS Number	10038-98-9
3D model (JSmol)	Interactive image
ChemSpider	59611
ECHA InfoCard	100.030.093
PubChem CID	66226
RTECS number	LY5220000
UNII	YSV1R803C0
CompTox Dashboard (EPA)	DTXSID1044350
- InChI: InChI=1S/Cl4Ge/c1-5(2,3)4 Key: IEXRMSFAVATTJX-UHFFFAOYSA-N; InChI=1S/Cl4Ge/c1-5(2,3)4 Key: IEXRMSFAVATTJX-UHFFFAOYSA-N
- SMILES: Cl[Ge](Cl)(Cl)Cl

Properties
Chemical formula	GeCl_{4}
Molar mass	214.40 g/mol
Appearance	Colourless liquid
Density	1.879 g/cm^{3} (20 °C); 1.844 g/cm^{3} (30 °C)
Melting point	−49.5 °C (−57.1 °F; 223.7 K)
Boiling point	86.5 °C (187.7 °F; 359.6 K)
Solubility in water	Soluble, hydrolyses
Solubility	Soluble in ether, benzene, chloroform, CCl_{4} Very soluble in HCl, dilute H_{2}SO_{4}
Magnetic susceptibility (χ)	−72.0·10^{−6} cm^{3}/mol
Refractive index (n_{D})	1.464

Structure
Molecular shape	tetrahedral

Thermochemistry
Std molar entropy (S^{⦵}_{298})	245.6 J·mol^{−1}·K^{−1}
Std enthalpy of formation (Δ_{f}H^{⦵}_{298})	−531.8 kJ·mol^{−1}
Gibbs free energy (Δ_{f}G^{⦵})	−462.7 kJ·mol^{−1}

Hazards
- Occupational safety and health (OHS/OSH)
Main hazards	Reacts slowly with water to form HCl and GeO_{2}, corrosive, lachrymator
NFPA 704 (fire diamond)	3 0 2 W
Flash point	Non-flammable
Safety data sheet (SDS)	"External MSDS"

Related compounds
Other anions	Germanium tetrafluoride Germanium tetrabromide Germanium tetraiodide
Other cations	Carbon tetrachloride Silicon tetrachloride Tin(IV) chloride Lead(IV) chloride
Related compounds	Germanium(II) chloride
- Except where otherwise noted, data are given for materials in their standard state (at 25 °C [77 °F], 100 kPa). verify (what is ?) Infobox references

Germanium tetrachloride is a colourless, fuming liquid with a peculiar, acidic odour. It is used as an intermediate in the production of purified germanium metal. In recent years, GeCl_{4} usage has increased substantially due to its use as a reagent for fiber optic production.

== Production ==
Most commercial production of germanium is from treating flue-dusts of zinc- and copper-ore smelters, although a significant source is also found in the ash from the combustion of certain types of coal called vitrain. Germanium tetrachloride is an intermediate for the purification of germanium metal or its oxide, GeO_{2}.

Germanium tetrachloride can be generated directly from GeO_{2} (germanium dioxide) by dissolution of the oxide in concentrated hydrochloric acid.

GeO_{2} + 4 HCl → GeCl_{4} + 2 H_{2}O

The resulting mixture is fractionally distilled to purify and separate the germanium tetrachloride from other products and impurities. The GeCl_{4} can be rehydrolysed with deionized water to produce pure GeO_{2}, which is then reduced under hydrogen to produce germanium metal.

Production of GeO_{2}, however, is dependent on the oxidized form of germanium extracted from the ore. Copper-lead-sulfide and zinc-sulfide ores will produce GeS_{2}, which is subsequently oxidized to GeO_{2} with an oxidizer such as sodium chlorate. Zinc-ores are roasted and sintered and can produce the GeO_{2} directly. The oxide is then processed as discussed above.

The classic synthesis from chlorine and germanium metal at elevated temperatures is also possible. Additionally, a chlorine free activation of germanium has been developed, giving a less energy intensive and more environmentally friendly alternative synthesis for germanium precursors.

== Application ==
Germanium tetrachloride is used almost exclusively as an intermediate for several optical processes. GeCl_{4} can be directly hydrolysed to GeO_{2}, an oxide glass with several unique properties and applications, described below and in linked articles:

=== Fiber optics ===
A notable derivative of GeCl_{4} is germanium dioxide. In the manufacture of optical fibers, silicon tetrachloride, SiCl_{4}, and germanium tetrachloride, GeCl_{4}, are introduced with oxygen into a hollow glass preform, which is carefully heated to allow for oxidation of the reagents to their respective oxides and formation of a glass mixture. The GeO_{2} has a high index of refraction, so by varying the flow rate of germanium tetrachloride the overall index of refraction of the optical fiber can be specifically controlled. The GeO_{2} is about 4% by weight of the glass.

== See also ==
- Germanium
- Optical fiber
- Infrared
