= Narrow-gap semiconductor =

All semiconductors with bandgaps smaller than silicon

Narrow-gap semiconductors are semiconducting materials with a magnitude of bandgap that is smaller than 0.7 eV, which corresponds to an infrared absorption cut-off wavelength over 2.5 micron. A more extended definition includes all semiconductors with bandgaps smaller than silicon (1.1 eV). Modern terahertz, infrared, and thermographic technologies are all based on this class of semiconductors.

Narrow-gap materials made it possible to realize satellite remote sensing, photonic integrated circuits for telecommunications, and unmanned vehicle Li-Fi systems, in the regime of Infrared detector and thermography. They are also the materials basis for terahertz technology, including security surveillance of concealed weapon uncovering, safe medical and industrial imaging with terahertz tomography, as well as dielectric wakefield accelerators. Besides, thermophotovoltaics embedded with narrow-gap semiconductors can potentially use the traditionally wasted portion of solar energy that takes up ~49% of the sun light spectrum. Spacecraft, deep ocean instruments, and vacuum physics setups use narrow-gap semiconductors to achieve cryogenic cooling.

== List of narrow-gap semiconductors ==
Name	Chemical formula	Groups	Band gap (300 K)
Mercury cadmium telluride	Hg_{1−x}Cd_{x}Te	II-VI	0 to 1.5 eV
Mercury zinc telluride	Hg_{1−x}Zn_{x}Te	II-VI	0.15 to 2.25 eV
Lead selenide	PbSe	IV-VI	0.27 eV
Lead(II) sulfide	PbS	IV-VI	0.37 eV
Tellurium	Te	VI	~0.3 eV
Lead telluride	PbTe	IV-VI	0.32 eV
Magnetite	Fe3O4	Transition Metal-VI	0.14 eV
Indium arsenide	InAs	III-V	0.354 eV
Alpha Tin	Sn	IV	0.08-0.1 eV
Indium antimonide	InSb	III-V	0.17 eV
Gallium antimonide	GaSb	III-V	0.67 eV - 0.79 eV
Cadmium arsenide	Cd_{3}As_{2}	II-V	0.5 to 0.6 eV
Bismuth telluride	Bi_{2}Te_{3}		0.21 eV
Tin telluride	SnTe	IV-VI	0.18 eV
Tin selenide	SnSe	IV-VI	0.9 eV
Silver(I) selenide	Ag_{2}Se		0.07 eV
Magnesium silicide	Mg_{2}Si	II-IV	0.79 eV

== See also ==
- List of semiconductor materials
- Wide-bandgap semiconductor
