= Lead sulfide =

Lead sulfide refers to two compounds containing lead and sulfur:

- Lead(II) sulfide, PbS, containing lead in the +2 oxidation state, naturally occurring as the mineral galena
- Lead(IV) sulfide, PbS_{2}, containing lead in the +4 oxidation state
