= Europium telluride =

Europium telluride may refer to:

- Europium(II) telluride
- Europium(III) telluride
