= Tin(II) sulfide =

Names
- IUPAC name Tin(II) sulfide
- Other names Tin monosulfide Herzenbergite

Identifiers
CAS Number	1314-95-0
3D model (JSmol)	Interactive image
ChemSpider	377250
ECHA InfoCard	100.013.863
EC Number	215-248-7
PubChem CID	426379
UNII	J4580W867H
CompTox Dashboard (EPA)	DTXSID401014321
- InChI: InChI=1S/S.Sn Key: AFNRRBXCCXDRPS-UHFFFAOYSA-N
- SMILES: S=[Sn]

Properties
Chemical formula	SnS
Molar mass	150.775 g/mol
Appearance	dark brown solid
Density	5.22 g/cm^{3}
Melting point	882 °C (1,620 °F; 1,155 K)
Boiling point	about 1230 ˚C
Solubility in water	Insoluble

Structure
Crystal structure	GeS type (orthorhombic), oP8
Space group	Pnma, No. 62
Lattice constant	a = 11.18 Å, b = 3.98 Å, c = 4.32 Å
Coordination geometry	asymmetric 3-fold (strongly distorted octahedral)

Hazards
- Occupational safety and health (OHS/OSH)
Main hazards	Irritant

Related compounds
Other anions	Tin(II) oxide Tin selenide Tin telluride
Other cations	Carbon monosulfide Silicon monosulfide Germanium monosulfide Lead(II) sulfide
Related compounds	Tin(IV) sulfide Tributyl tin sulfide
- Except where otherwise noted, data are given for materials in their standard state (at 25 °C [77 °F], 100 kPa). verify (what is ?) Infobox references

Tin(II) sulfide is an inorganic compound with the chemical formula is SnS. A black or brown solid, it occurs as the rare mineral herzenbergite (α-SnS).It is insoluble in water but dissolves with degradation in concentrated hydrochloric acid. Tin(II) sulfide is insoluble in ammonium sulfide.

== Synthesis ==
The preparation of tin(II) sulfide has been extensively investigated, and the direct reaction of the elements is inefficient. Instead, molten potassium thiocyanate reliably reacts with stannic oxide to give SnS at 450 °C:

SnO_{2} + 2 KSCN → SnS + K_{2}S + 2CO + N_{2}

SnS also forms when aqueous solutions of tin(II) salts are treated with hydrogen sulfide. This conversion is a step in qualitative inorganic analysis.

At cryogenic temperatures, stannous chloride dissolves in liquid hydrogen sulfide. It then decomposes to the sulfide, but only slowly.

== Structure ==
At temperatures above 905 K, SnS undergoes a second order phase transition to β-SnS (space group: Cmcm, No. 63). A new polymorph of SnS exists based upon the cubic crystal system, known as π-SnS (space group: P2_{1}3, No. 198). Herzenbergite (α-SnS) can be exfoliated to form layered structure similar to that of black phosphorus, featuring 3-coordinate Sn and S centers. Analogous to black phosphorus, tin(II) sulfide can be ultrasonically exfoliated in liquids to produce atomically thin semiconducting SnS sheets that have a wider optical band gap (>1.5 eV) compared to the bulk crystal.

== Photovoltaic applications ==
Tin(II) sulfide has been evaluated as a candidate for thin-film solar cells. Currently, both cadmium telluride and CIGS (copper indium gallium selenide) are used as p-type absorber layers, but they are formulated from toxic, scarce constituents. Tin(II) sulfide, by contrast, is formed from cheap, earth-abundant elements, and is nontoxic. This material also has a high optical absorption coefficient, p-type conductivity, and a mid range direct band gap of 1.3-1.4 eV, required electronic properties for this type of absorber layer. Based on the a detailed balance calculation using the material bandgap, the power conversion efficiency of a solar cell utilizing a tin(II) sulfide absorber layer could be as high as 32%, which is comparable to crystalline silicon. Finally, Tin(II) sulfide is stable in both alkaline and acidic conditions. All aforementioned characteristics suggest tin(II) sulfide as an interesting material to be used as a solar cell absorber layer.

Power conversion efficiencies for tin(II) sulfide thin films in photovoltaic cells are less than 5%. Barriers for use include a low open circuit voltage and an inability to realize many of the above properties due to challenges in fabrication.
