= SNTE =

SNTE may refer to:

- Sindicato Nacional de Trabajadores de la Educación (National Educational Workers Union), Mexico
- Société Nouvelle d'Exploitation de la Tour Eiffel, former name of the organization that operates the Eiffel Tower
- Tin telluride (SnTe), a chemical compound
