= Carbon monosulfide =

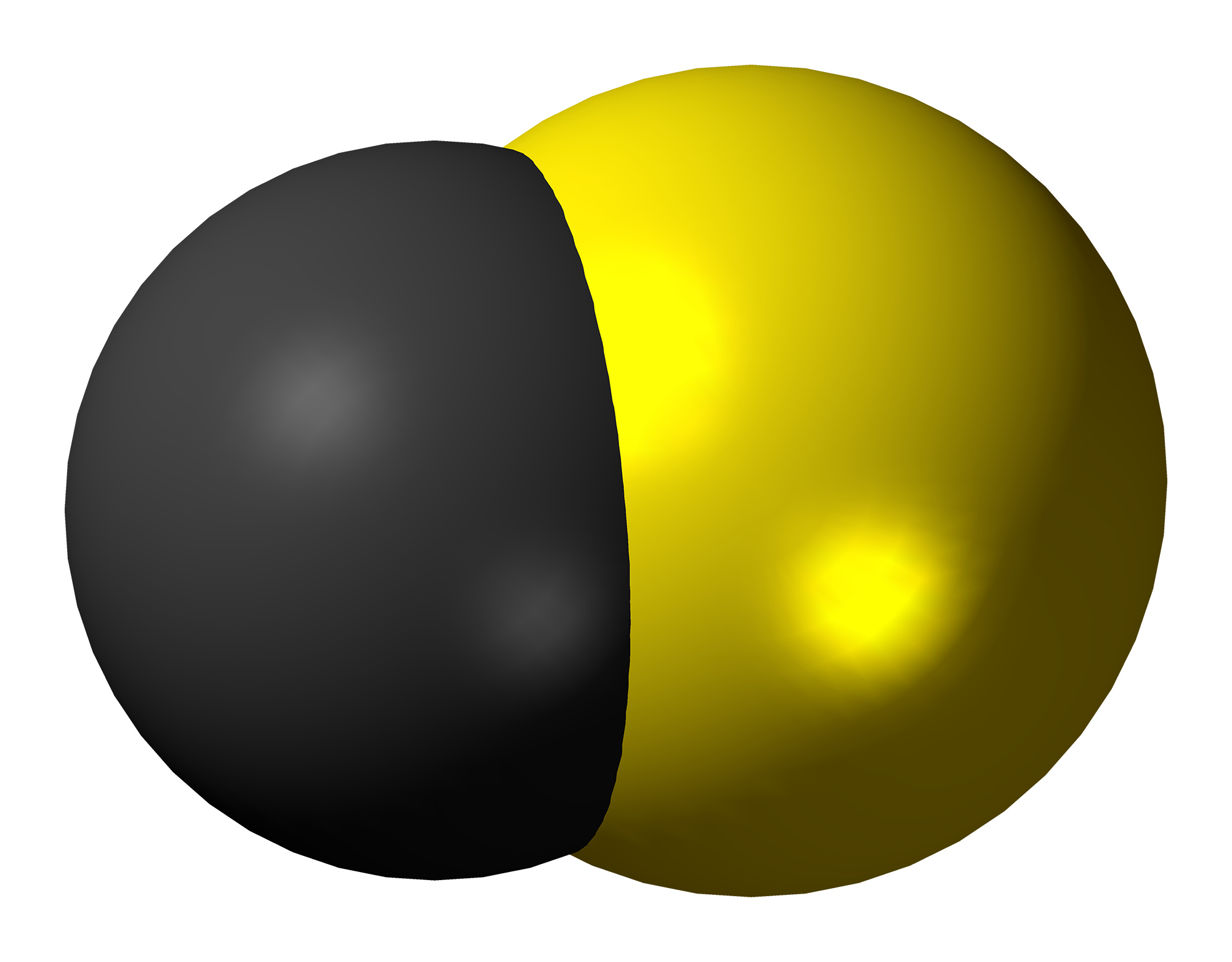

Names
- IUPAC name carbon monosulfide
- Other names carbon(II) sulfide, thiocarbonyl, sulfidocarbon, methanidylidynesulfanium

Identifiers
CAS Number	2944-05-0
3D model (JSmol)	Interactive image
Beilstein Reference	1697516, 1918616
ChEBI	CHEBI:30253
ChemSpider	97157
Gmelin Reference	648
PubChem CID	108054
CompTox Dashboard (EPA)	DTXSID00183645
- InChI: InChI=1S/CS/c1-2 Key: DXHPZXWIPWDXHJ-UHFFFAOYSA-N; InChI=1/CS/c1-2 Key: DXHPZXWIPWDXHJ-UHFFFAOYAW
- SMILES: [S+]#[C-]

Properties
Chemical formula	CS
Molar mass	44.07 g·mol^{−1}
Appearance	reddish crystalline powder
Solubility in water	insoluble

Related compounds
Other anions	Carbon monoxide
Other cations	Silicon monosulfide Germanium monosulfide Tin(II) sulfide Lead(II) sulfide
- Except where otherwise noted, data are given for materials in their standard state (at 25 °C [77 °F], 100 kPa). verify (what is ?) Infobox references

Carbon monosulfide is a chemical compound with the formula CS. This diatomic molecule is the sulfur analogue of carbon monoxide, and is unstable as a solid or a liquid, but it has been observed as a gas both in the laboratory and in the interstellar medium. The molecule resembles carbon monoxide with a triple bond between carbon and sulfur. The molecule is not intrinsically unstable, but it tends to polymerize in sunlight to a brown mass, as first discovered in 1868 and 1872. The polymer is quite stable, decomposing a little at 360 °C to carbon disulfide. This tendency towards polymerization reflects the greater stability of C–S single bonds.

Polymers with the formula (CS)_{n} have been reported, and the formal dimer is ethenedithione. Also, CS has been observed as a ligand in some transition metal thiocarbonyl complexes such as Fe(CO)_{4}CS.

The simplest carbon monosulfide synthesis decomposes carbon disulfide in a high-voltage AC arc.

== In astronomy ==
Carbon monosulfide is significant for being one of the first-detected sulfur compounds in the interstellar medium. It was discovered via radio observations in the Orion region.

Carbon monosulfide was observed in the stratosphere of Jupiter following the collision of comet Shoemaker–Levy 9 with the planet in 1994. Though decreased in total mass by 90%, concentrations of CS were detected 19 years after the impact with the Atacama Submillimeter Telescope Experiment.
