= Thulium(III) telluride =

Identifiers
CAS Number	12166-69-7
3D model (JSmol)	Interactive image
PubChem CID	44135919
- InChI: InChI=1S/2Tm.3Te/q2*+3;3*-2 Key: HEPKJXBBYRJGCC-UHFFFAOYSA-N
- SMILES: [Tm+3].[Tm+3].[Te-2].[Te-2].[Te-2]

Properties
Chemical formula	Te_{3}Tm_{2}
Molar mass	720.67 g·mol^{−1}
- Except where otherwise noted, data are given for materials in their standard state (at 25 °C [77 °F], 100 kPa). Infobox references

Thulium(III) telluride is an inorganic compound, one of the tellurides of thulium, with the chemical formula Tm_{2}Te_{3}. It is an orthorhombic crystal with space group Fddd. It can dissolve in lead telluride at high temperatures to form a solid solution.
