= Tin(IV) iodate =

Names
- IUPAC name triiodyloxystannyl iodate

Identifiers
| CAS Number | 57232-85-6 |
| 3D model (JSmol) | Interactive image |
| PubChem CID | 129651196 |
- InChI: InChI=1S/4HIO3.Sn/c4*2-1(3)4;/h4*(H,2,3,4);/q;;;;+4/p-4 Key: WGVVTQUSFDMILB-UHFFFAOYSA-J
- SMILES: O=I(=O)O[Sn](OI(=O)=O)(OI(=O)=O)OI(=O)=O

Properties
| Chemical formula | Sn(IO_{3})_{4} |
| Molar mass | 818.29 |
| Appearance | colourless columnal crystals |
| Density | 5.107 g·cm^{−3}（23 °C) |
- Except where otherwise noted, data are given for materials in their standard state (at 25 °C [77 °F], 100 kPa). Infobox references

Tin(IV) iodate is an inorganic compound with the chemical formula Sn(IO_{3})_{4}. It was first obtained in 2020 through the hydrothermal reaction of tin(II) oxide and iodic acid in water at 220 °C. It is a colorless columnar crystal, crystallized in the triclinic P1̅ space group. It has an indirect band gap (experimental 4.0 eV; calculated 2.75 eV).
