= Europium(III) telluride =

Identifiers
| CAS Number | 12020-74-5 |
| 3D model (JSmol) | Interactive image |
- InChI: InChI=1S/2Eu.3Te/q2*+3;3*-2 Key: ZJYRIAUVAHYSPF-UHFFFAOYSA-N
- SMILES: [Eu+3].[Eu+3].[Te-2].[Te-2].[Te-2]

Properties
| Chemical formula | Eu_{2}Te_{3} |
| Molar mass | 686.73 g·mol^{−1} |
| Appearance | grey |
- Except where otherwise noted, data are given for materials in their standard state (at 25 °C [77 °F], 100 kPa). Infobox references

Europium(III) telluride is an inorganic compound, one of the tellurides of europium, with the chemical formula Eu_{2}Te_{3}. In this compound, Eu is in the +3 oxidation state. It can form cubic crystals. It has limited solubility in lead telluride and forms a solid solution.

== External reading ==
- G. Gerth, P. Kienle, K. Luchner (Nov 1968). "Chemical effects on the isomer shift in 151Eu". Physics Letters A. 27 (8): 557–558. doi:10.1016/0375-9601(68)90919-5.
- Karl A. Gschneidner Jr. and LeRoy Eyring. Handbook on the Physics and Chemistry of Rare Earths, volume 13. Elsevier, 1990. ISBN 978-0-444-88547-0. (pdf)
