= Lead(II) oxide =

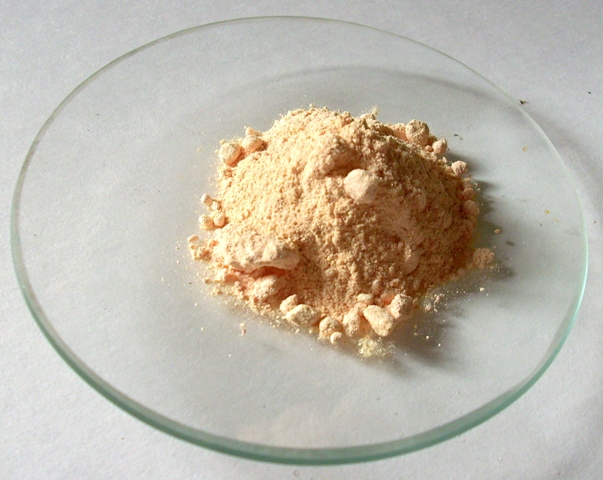

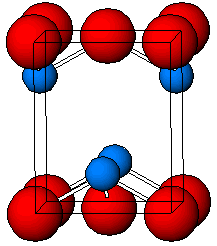

Names
- IUPAC name Lead(II) oxide
- Other names Lead monoxide Litharge; Massicot; Plumbous oxide

Identifiers
CAS Number	1317-36-8
3D model (JSmol)	Interactive image
ChEBI	CHEBI:81045
ChemSpider	140169
ECHA InfoCard	100.013.880
EC Number	215-267-0
KEGG	C17379
PubChem CID	14827
RTECS number	OG1750000
UNII	4IN6FN8492
UN number	3288 2291 3077
CompTox Dashboard (EPA)	DTXSID601018731 DTXSID0029638, DTXSID601018731
- InChI: InChI=1S/O.Pb Key: YEXPOXQUZXUXJW-UHFFFAOYSA-N
- SMILES: O=[Pb]

Properties
Chemical formula	PbO
Molar mass	223.20 g/mol
Appearance	red or yellow powder
Density	9.53 g/cm^{3}
Melting point	888 °C (1,630 °F; 1,161 K)
Boiling point	1,477 °C (2,691 °F; 1,750 K)
Solubility in water	α-PbO: 0.0504 g/L (25 °C) β-PbO: 0.1065 g/L (25 °C)
Solubility	insoluble
Magnetic susceptibility (χ)	4.20×10^{−5} cm^{3}/mol

Structure
Crystal structure	Tetragonal, tP4
Space group	P4/nmm, No. 129

Hazards
- GHS labelling
Pictograms	(GHS07: Exclamation mark) (GHS08: Health hazard) (GHS09: Environmental hazard)
Signal word	Danger
Hazard statements	H302, H332, H351, H360Df, H362, H373, H410
Precautionary statements	P201, P202, P260, P263, P264, P270, P271, P273, P281, P301+P312, P304+P312, P304+P340, P308+P313, P312, P314, P330, P391, P405, P501
NFPA 704 (fire diamond)	3 0 0
Flash point	Non-flammable
- Lethal dose or concentration (LD, LC)
LD_{Lo} (lowest published)	1400 mg/kg (dog, oral)
Safety data sheet (SDS)	ICSC 0288

Related compounds
Other anions	Lead(II) sulfide Lead selenide Lead telluride
Other cations	Germanium monoxide Tin(II) oxide
Related	Lead(II,IV) oxide Lead dioxide
Related compounds	Thallium(III) oxide Bismuth(III) oxide
- Except where otherwise noted, data are given for materials in their standard state (at 25 °C [77 °F], 100 kPa). verify (what is ?) Infobox references

Lead(II) oxide, also called lead monoxide, is the inorganic compound with the molecular formula PbO. It is insoluble in water. It occurs in two polymorphs: litharge having a tetragonal crystal structure, and massicot having an orthorhombic crystal structure. Modern applications for PbO are mostly in lead-based industrial glass and industrial ceramics, including computer components.

== Types ==
Lead oxide exists in two polymorphs:

- Red tetragonal (α-PbO), obtained at temperatures below 486 °C (907 °F)
- Yellow orthorhombic (β-PbO), obtained at temperatures above 486 °C (907 °F)

== Synthesis ==
PbO may be prepared by heating lead metal in air at approximately 600 °C (1,100 °F). At this temperature it is also the end product of decomposition of other oxides of lead in air:

$$\ce{PbO2->[{293 °C}] Pb12O19 ->[{351 °C}]  Pb12O17 ->[{375 °C}] Pb3O4 ->[{605 °C}] PbO}$$

Thermal decomposition of lead(II) nitrate or lead(II) carbonate also results in the formation of PbO:

2 Pb(NO_{3})_{2} → 2 PbO + 4 NO_{2} + O_{2}
PbCO_{3} → PbO + CO_{2}

PbO is produced on a large scale as an intermediate product in refining raw lead ores into metallic lead. The usual lead ore is galena (lead(II) sulfide). At a temperature of around 1,000 °C (1,800 °F) in air, the sulfide converted to the oxide:

2 PbS + 3 O_{2} → 2 PbO + 2 SO_{2}

=== From lead ===
Lead combusts at high temperature. According to the Barton pot method, refined molten lead droplets are oxidized under a forced air flow which carries them out to the separation system (e.g. cyclonic separators) for further processing. Oxides produced by this method are mostly a mixture of α-PbO and β-PbO. The overall reaction, which is conducted at 450 °C is:

Pb + O_{2} → 2 PbO

Using a Ball mill, lead balls are oxidized in a cooled rotating drum. The oxidation is achieved by collisions of the balls. Just like in Barton pot method, the supply of air and separators may also be used.

== Structure ==
As determined by X-ray crystallography, both polymorphs, tetragonal and orthorhombic feature a pyramidal four-coordinate lead center. In the tetragonal form the four lead–oxygen bonds have the same length, but in the orthorhombic two are shorter and two longer. The pyramidal nature indicates the presence of a stereochemically active lone pair of electrons. When PbO occurs in tetragonal lattice structure it is called litharge, and when the PbO has orthorhombic lattice structure it is called massicot. The PbO can be changed from massicot to litharge or vice versa by controlled heating and cooling. The tetragonal form is usually red or orange color, while the orthorhombic is usually yellow or orange, but the color is not a very reliable indicator of the structure. The tetragonal and orthorhombic forms of PbO occur naturally as rare minerals.

Crystal structure in litharge form
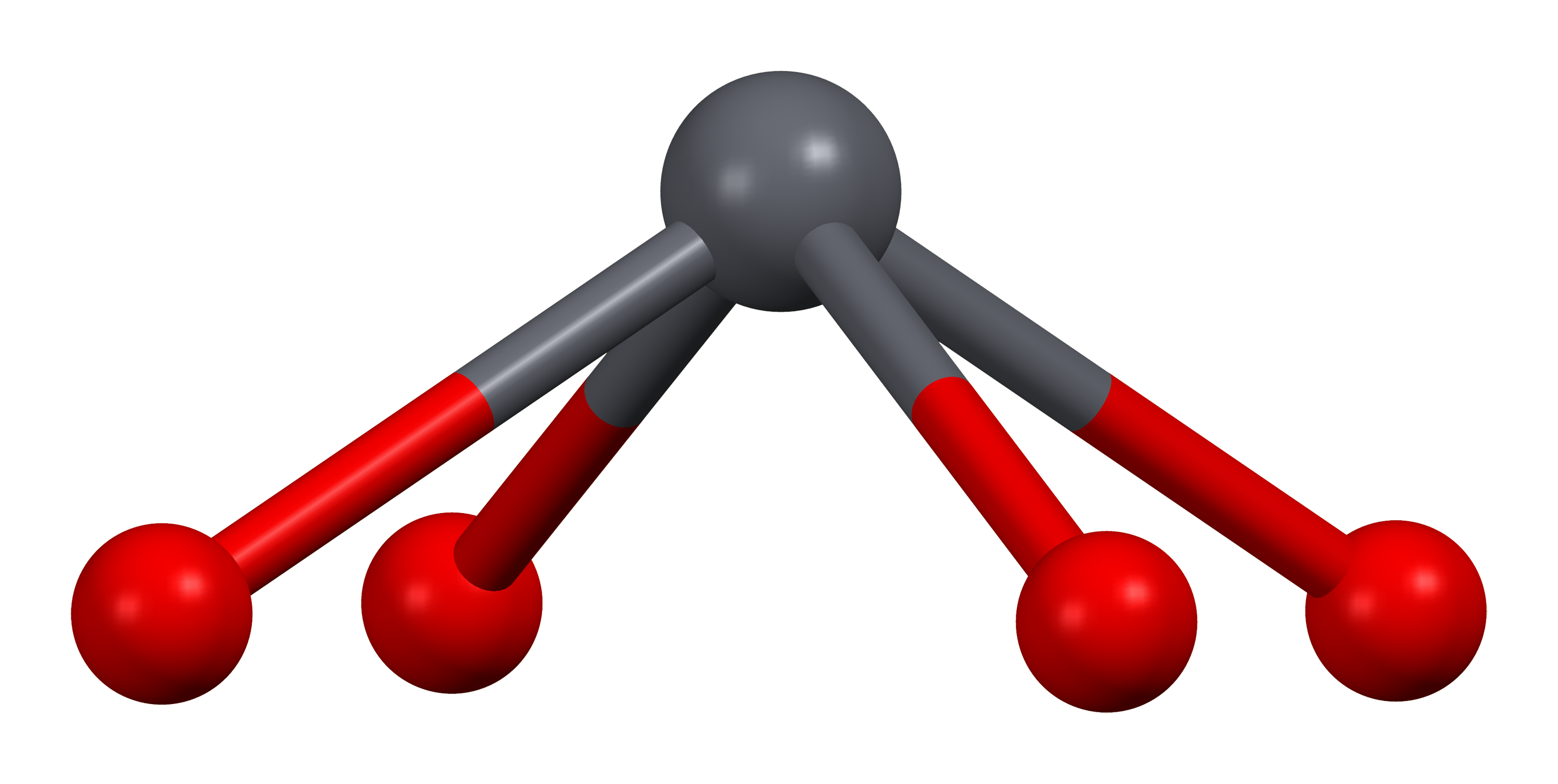
Pb coordinates square-pyramidally

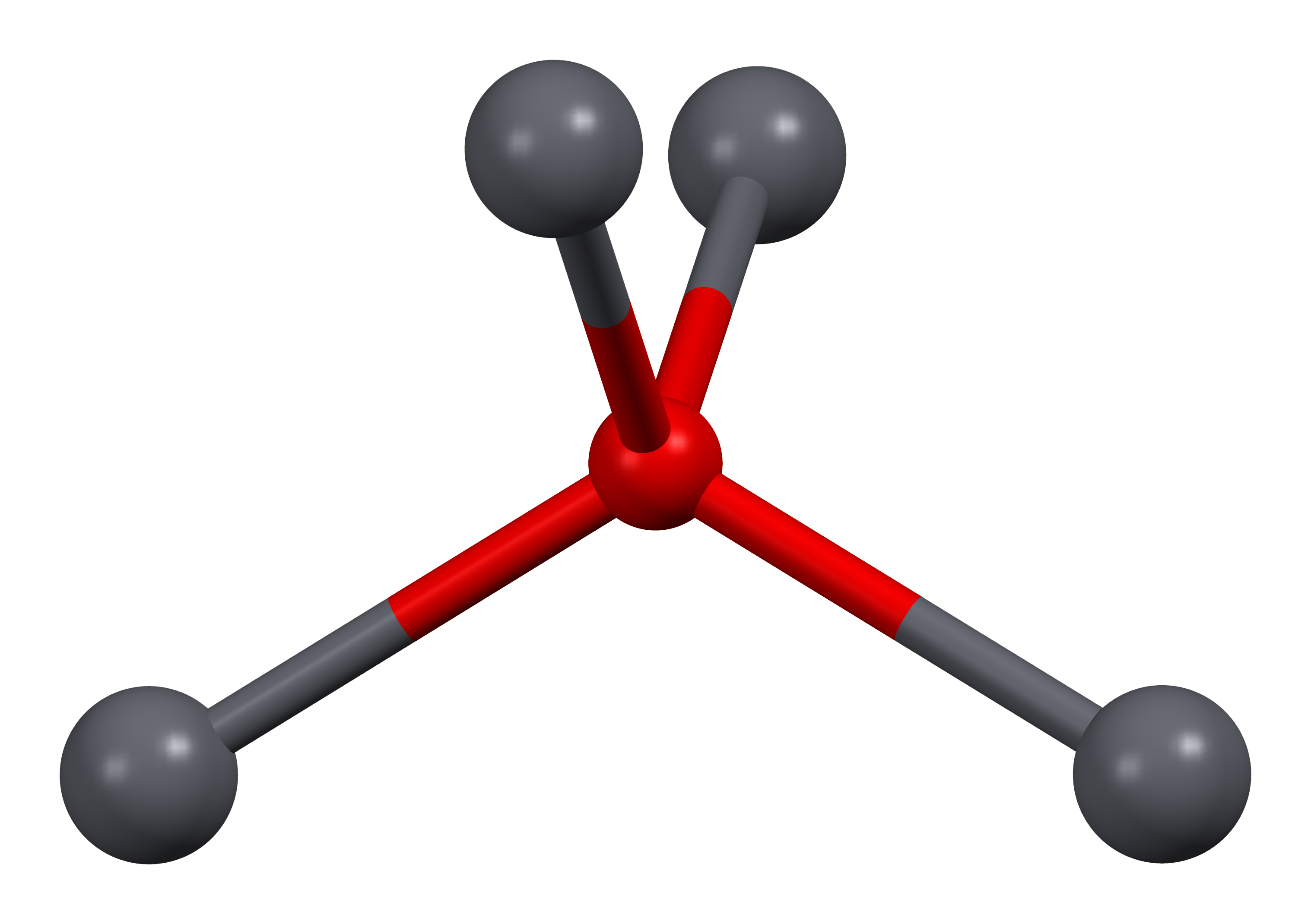
O coordinates distorted-tetrahedrally

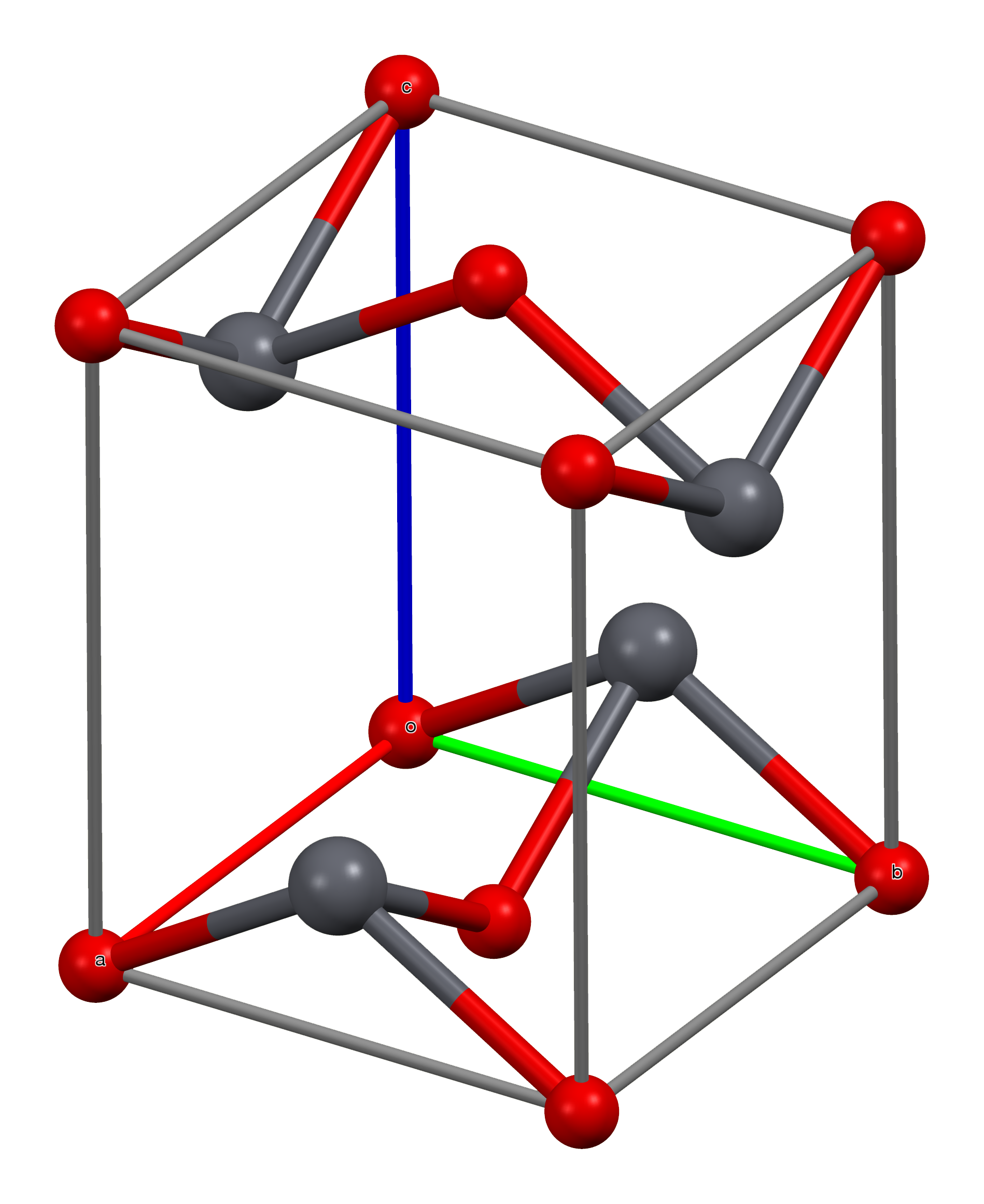
Unit cell

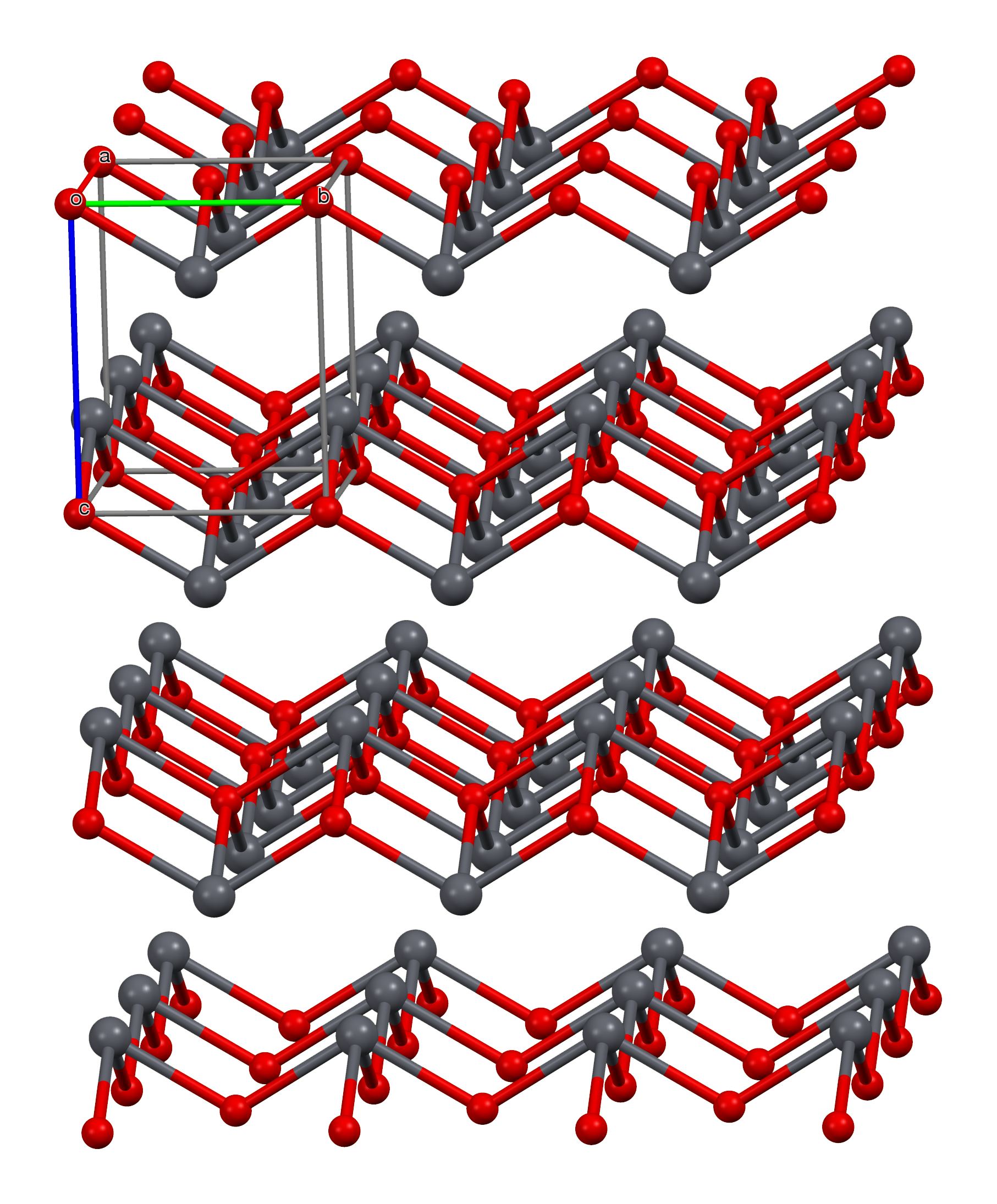
3×3×3 unit cells

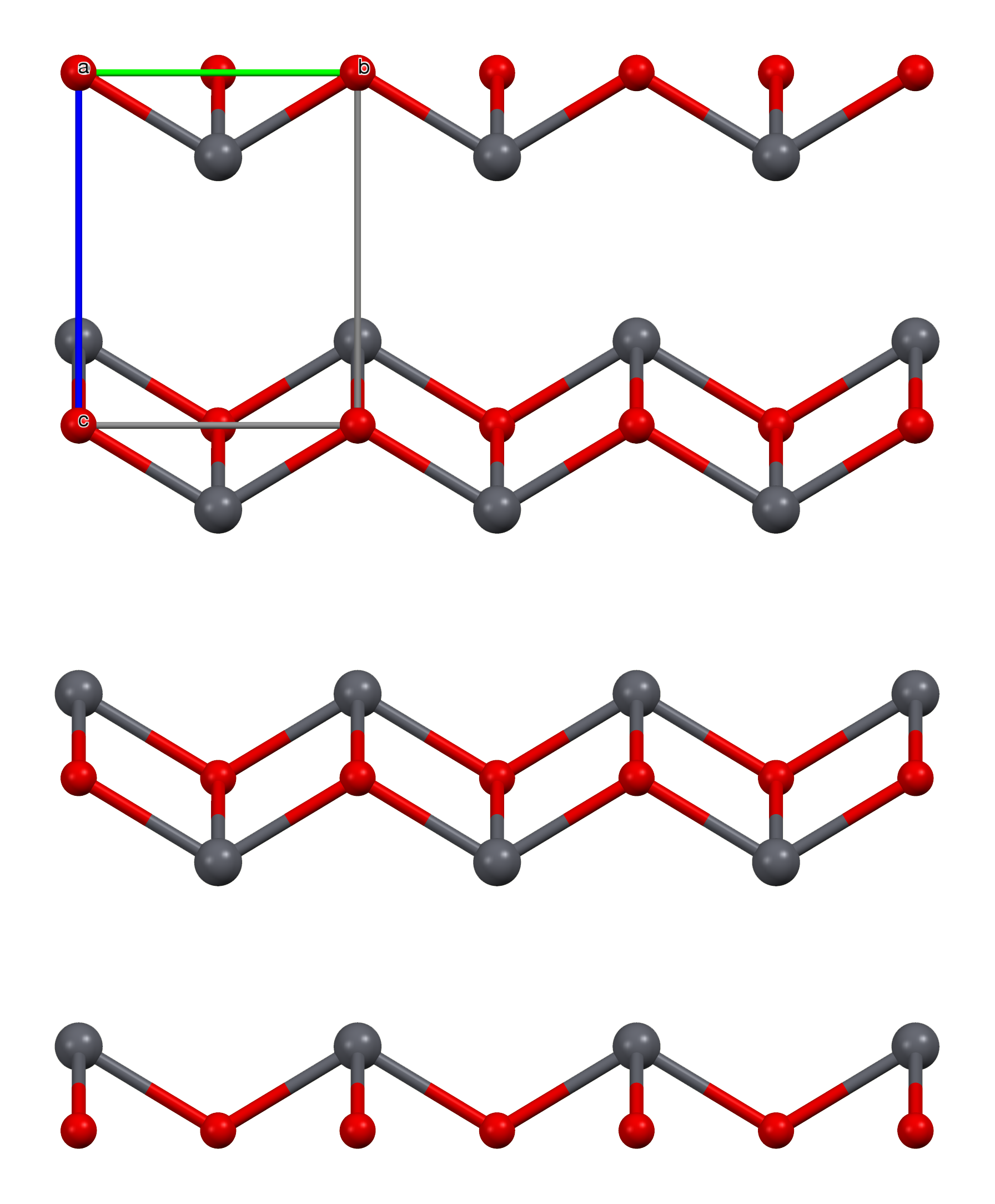
Along the a axis

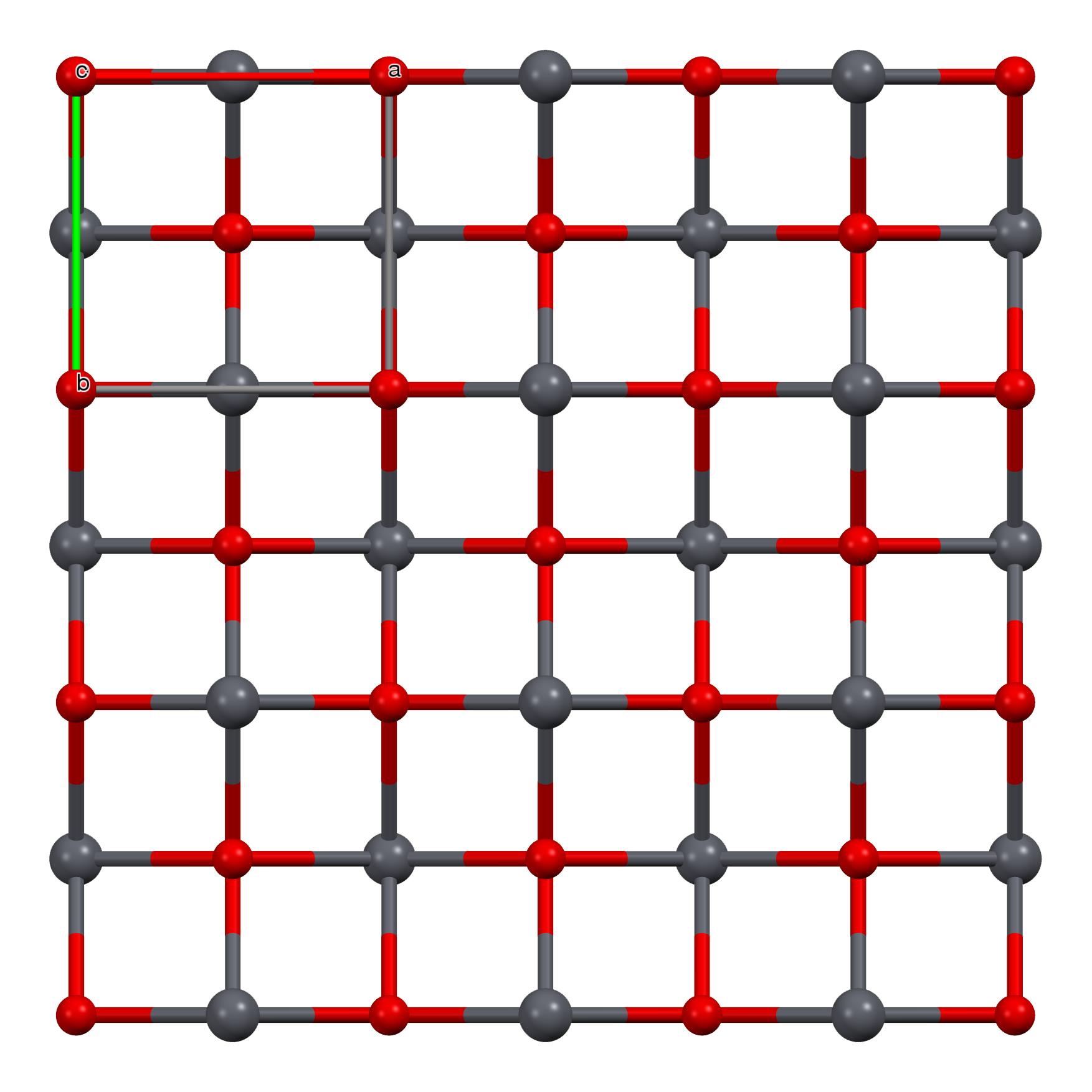
Along the c axis

== Reactions ==
PbO is reduced to elemental lead when heated under carbon monoxide at around 1,200 °C (2,200 °F):

PbO + CO → Pb + CO_{2}

The red and yellow forms of this material are related by a small change in enthalpy:

PbO_{(red)} → PbO_{(yellow)} ΔH = 1.6 kJ/mol

PbO is amphoteric, which means that it reacts with both acids and with bases. With acids, it forms salts of Pb^{2+} via the intermediacy of oxo clusters such as [Pb_{6}O(OH)_{6}]^{4+}. With strong bases, PbO dissolves to form plumbite (also called plumbate(II)) salts:

PbO + H_{2}O + OH^{−} → [Pb(OH)_{3}]^{−}

== Applications ==
PbO is used extensively in making glass. Depending on the glass formula, the effect of PbO can be one or more of:

- increasing the refractive index,
- increasing the dispersion (i. e. reducing the Abbe number),
- decreasing the viscosity,
- increasing the electrical resistivity,
- increasing the absorption of X-ray radiation.

Historically, PbO was used extensively in ceramic glazes for household ceramics. Technical ceramics also make use of PbO, including ferroelectric and piezoelectric materials, used in capacitors, actuators and electrooptic devices. Other less dominant applications include the vulcanization of rubber and the production of certain pigments and paints. PbO is used in cathode-ray tube glass to block X-ray emission, but mainly in the neck and funnel of the tube, because it can cause discoloration when used in the faceplate. Strontium oxide and Barium oxide are preferred for the faceplate.

The consumption of lead, and hence the processing of PbO, correlates with the number of automobiles, because lead remains the key component of automotive lead–acid batteries.

=== Niche or declining uses ===
A mixture of PbO with glycerine sets to a hard, waterproof cement that has been used to join the flat glass sides and bottoms of aquariums, and was also once used to seal glass panels in window frames. It is a component of lead paints.

PbO was one of the raw materials for century eggs, a type of Chinese preserved egg. but it has been gradually replaced due to health problems. It was an unscrupulous practice in some small factories but it became rampant in China and forced many honest manufacturers to label their boxes "lead-free" after the scandal went mainstream in 2013.

In powdered tetragonal litharge form, it can be mixed with linseed oil and then boiled to create a weather-resistant sizing used in gilding. The litharge would give the sizing a dark red color that made the gold leaf appear warm and lustrous, while the linseed oil would impart adhesion and a flat durable binding surface.

PbO is used in certain condensation reactions in organic synthesis.

PbO is the input photoconductor in a video camera tube called the Plumbicon.

== Health issues ==

Lead oxide is toxic and irritating to skin, eyes, and respiratory tract. It affects gum tissue, the central nervous system, the kidneys, the blood, and the reproductive system. It can bioaccumulate in plants and in mammals.
