= Transition metal thiocarbonyl complex =

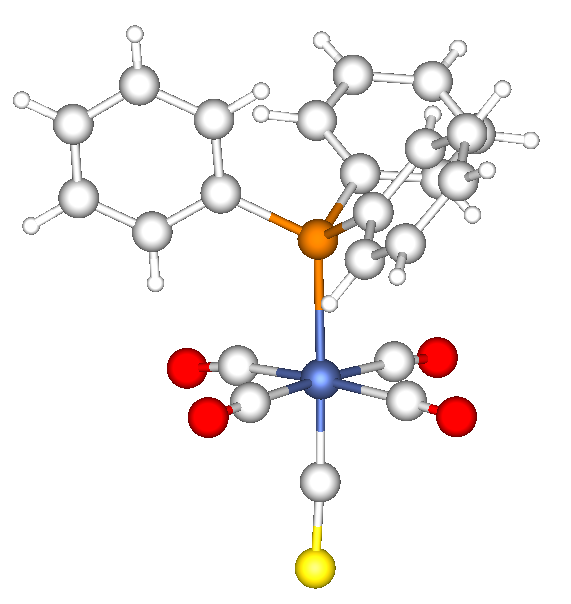
Structure of Cr(CS)(CO)_{4}(P(C_{6}H_{5})_{3}). Color code: yellow = S, orange = P, red = O. Selected distances: C-S = 154, C-O = 113, Cr-CS = 179, Cr-CO = 190 picometers

A transition metal thiocarbonyl complex is a coordination compound containing the ligand CS. Whereas metal carbonyl complexes are very common, even industrially important, only a few dozen thiocarbonyl complexes are known.

== Preparation ==
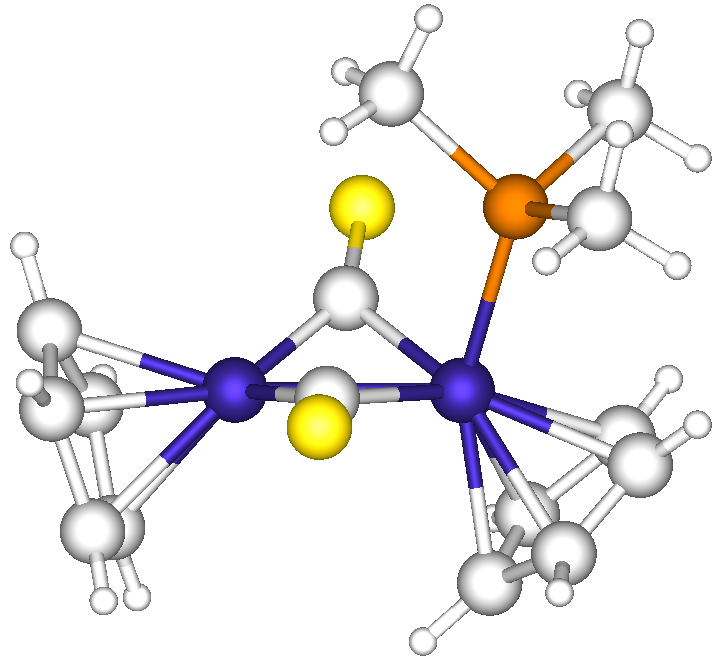
Structure of (C_{5}H_{5})_{2}Co_{2}(μ-CS)_{2}(P(CH_{3})_{3}). Selected bond distances: C-S, 159; SC-Co(P), 195; SC-Co, 180; Co-Co, 239 picometers.

The main challenge for the preparation of thiocarbonyl complexes is the unavailability of carbon monosulfide. Thus, the CS ligand is often extruded from thiocarbonyl-containing precursors. One reagent is thiophosgene, which reacts with disodium tetracarbonylferrate:

Na_{2}Fe(CO)_{4} + CSCl_{2} → Fe(CO)_{4}CS + 2 NaCl

Instead of thiophosgene, chlorothioformates (ClC(S)OAr) have also been used as a source of CS ligands. The thiocarbonyl analogue of Vaska's complex is prepared in this way.

Carbon disulfide is another source of thiocarbonyl ligands, although CS_{2} is less electrophilic than thiophosgene and its alkoxy derivative. Carbon disulfide forms η^{2}-CS_{2} complexes (see transition metal complexes of carbon disulfide), which are susceptible to desulfurization. This pattern is illustrated by the reaction of Wilkinson's catalyst (RhCl(PPh_{3})_{3}):

RhCl(PPh_{3})_{3} + CS_{2} → RhCl(CS_{2})(PPh_{3})_{3}
RhCl(CS_{2})(PPh_{3})_{3} → RhCl(CS)(PPh_{3})_{2} + SPPh_{3}

This conversion gave rise to the very first thiocarbonyl complex.

The reaction of (C_{5}H_{5})_{2}Ni_{2}(CO)_{2} with carbon disulfide gives ca 30% yield of (C_{5}H_{5})_{3}Ni_{3}(CS)_{2}, a trimetallic cluster with two triply bridging thiocarbonyl ligands. Many other thiocarbonyl complexes arise from similarly complicated reactions in modest yield, including addition of sulfur reagents to metal carbyne complexes.

== Structure and bonding ==
According to the Covalent bond classification method, terminal CS is classified as an L ligand, i.e., a charge-neutral Lewis base. With respect to HSAB theory, it is classified as soft. According to spectroscopic measurements, CS is a superior pi-acceptor relative to CO, as indicated by the shortness of M-CS vs M-CO bonds.

== Selenocarbonyl and tellurocarbonyl complexes ==
Several complexes of CSe and CTe have been characterized. The first examples were prepared from the osmium dichlorocarbene complex.

OsCl_{2}(CCl_{2})(PPh_{3})_{2}(CO) + 2 EH^{−} → OsCl_{2}(CE)(PPh_{3})_{2}(CO) + 2 Cl^{−} + H_{2}E (E = Se, Te; Ph = C_{6}H_{5})
