= Lead tin telluride =

Alloy of lead, tin and tellurium

Lead tin telluride, also referred to as PbSnTe or Pb_{1−x}Sn_{x}Te, is a ternary alloy of lead, tin and tellurium, generally made by alloying either tin into lead telluride or lead into tin telluride. It is a IV-VI narrow band gap semiconductor material.

The band gap of Pb_{1−x}Sn_{x}Te is tuned by varying the composition(x) in the material. SnTe can be alloyed with Pb (or PbTe with Sn) in order to tune the band gap from 0.29 eV (PbTe) to 0.18 eV (SnTe). Unlike II-VI chalcogenides, e.g. cadmium, mercury and zinc chalcogenides, the band gap in Pb_{1−x}Sn_{x}Te does not changes linearly between the two extremes. In contrast, as the composition (x) is increased, the band gap decreases, approaches zero in the concentration regime (0.32–0.65 corresponding to temperature 4-300 K, respectively) and further increases towards bulk band gap of SnTe. Therefore, the lead tin telluride alloys have narrower band gaps than their end point counterparts making lead tin telluride an ideal candidate for mid infrared, 3–14 μm opto-electronic application.

== Properties ==
Lead tin telluride is p-type semiconductor at 300 K. The hole concentration increases as the tin content is increased resulting in an increase in electrical conductivity. For composition range x = 0 to 0.1, electrical conductivity decreases with increase in temperature up to 500 K and increases beyond 500 K. For composition range, x ≥ 0.25, electrical conductivity decreases with increases in temperature.

The Seebeck coefficient of Pb_{1−x}Sn_{x}Te decreases with increases in Sn content at 300 K.

For composition x > 0.25, thermal conductivity of Pb_{1−x}Sn_{x}Te increases with increase in Sn content. Thermal conductivity values decreases with increase in temperature over the entire composition range, x > 0.

For Pb_{1−x}Sn_{x}Te, the optimum temperature corresponding to maximum thermoelectric power factor increases with increase in composition x. The pseudo binary alloy of Lead tin telluride acts as a thermoelectric material over 400–700 K temperature range.

Lead tin telluride has a positive temperature coefficient i.e. for a given composition x, band gap increases with temperature. Therefore, temperature stability has to be maintained while working with lead tin telluride based laser. However, the advantage is that the operating wavelength of the laser can simply be tuned by varying the operating temperature.

The optical absorption coefficient of lead tin telluride is typically ~750 cm^{−1} as compared to ~50 cm^{−1} for the extrinsic semiconductors such as doped silicon. The higher optical coefficient value not only ensures higher sensitivity but also reduces the spacing required between individual detector elements to prevent optical cross talk making integrated circuit technology easily accessible.

== Application ==
Due to tunable narrow band gap and relatively higher operating temperature of lead tin telluride as compared to mercury cadmium telluride, it has been a material of choice for commercial applications in IR sources, band-pass filters and IR detectors. It has found applications as photovoltaic devices for sensing radiation in 8-14 μm window.

Single Crystal Pb_{1−x}Sn_{x}Te diode lasers have been employed for detection of gaseous pollutants like sulfur dioxide.

Lead tin tellurides have been used in thermoelectric devices.
