= Germanium monoselenide =

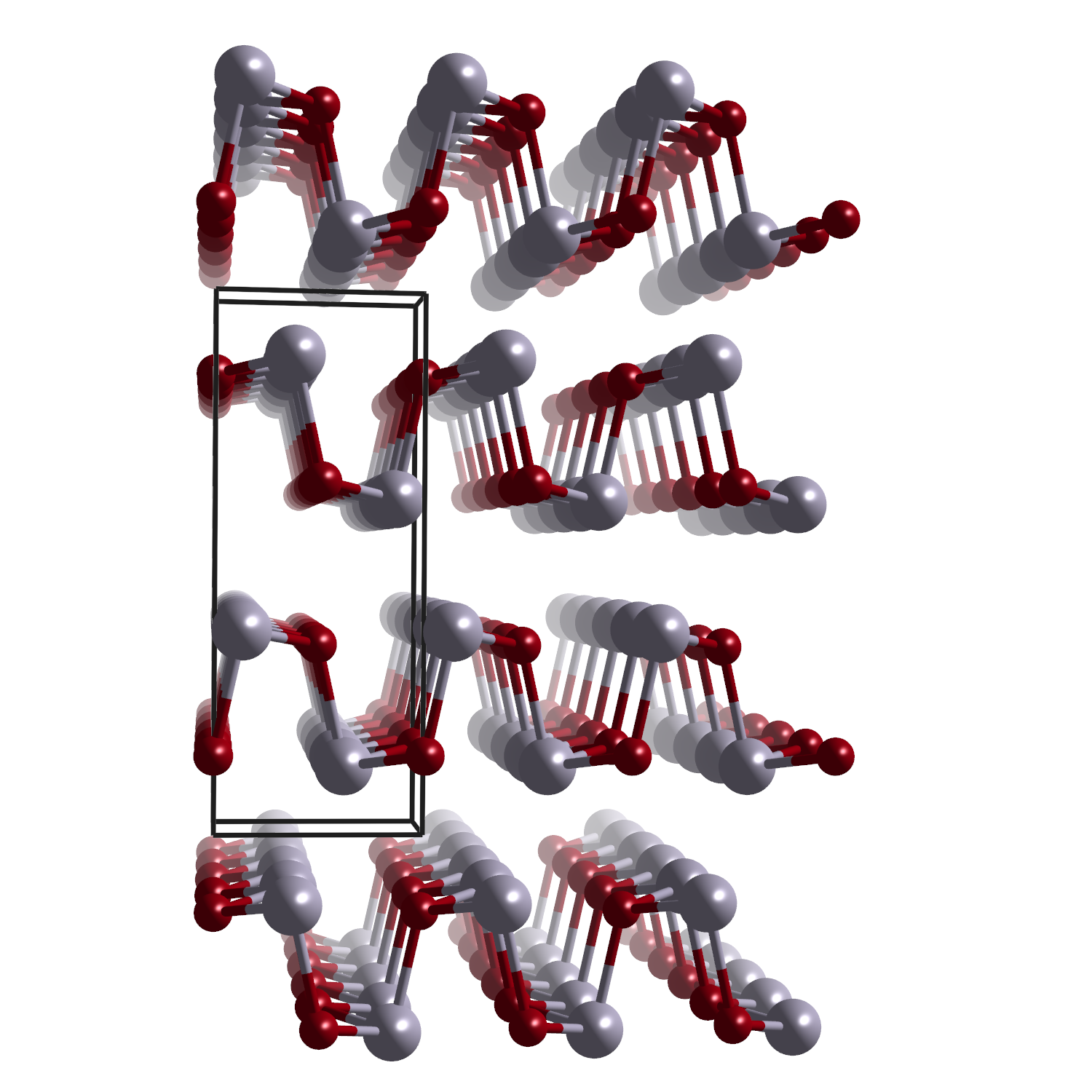

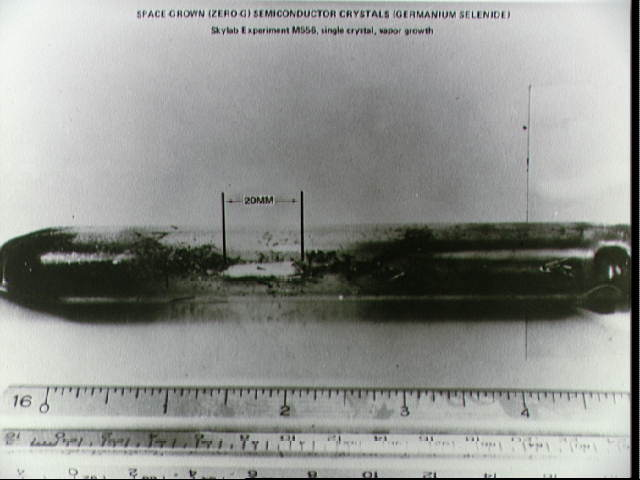

Names
- IUPAC name Germanium selenide
- Other names germanium(II) selenide

Identifiers
CAS Number	12065-10-0
3D model (JSmol)	Interactive image
ChemSpider	21170394
ECHA InfoCard	100.031.862
PubChem CID	12049114
CompTox Dashboard (EPA)	DTXSID601014315
- InChI: InChI=1S/GeSe/c1-2 Key: RXQPCQXEUZLFTE-UHFFFAOYSA-N
- SMILES: [Ge]=[Se]

Properties
Chemical formula	GeSe
Molar mass	151.57 g/mol
Appearance	black
Density	5.56 g/cm^{3}
Melting point	667 °C (1,233 °F; 940 K) (decomposes)
Band gap	1.33 eV (direct)
Refractive index (n_{D})	2.5

Structure
Crystal structure	Orthorhombic
Space group	Pnma

Related compounds
Other anions	Germanium monoxide Germanium monosulfide Germanium telluride
Other cations	Tin selenide Lead selenide
- Except where otherwise noted, data are given for materials in their standard state (at 25 °C [77 °F], 100 kPa). verify (what is ?) Infobox references

Germanium monoselenide is a chemical compound with the formula GeSe. It exists as black crystalline powder having orthorhombic (distorted NaCl-type) crystal symmetry; at temperatures ~650 °C, it transforms into the cubic NaCl structure. GeSe has been shown to have stereochemically active Ge 4s lone pairs that are responsible for the distorted structure and the relatively high position of the valence band maximum with respect to the vacuum level.

To grow GeSe crystals, GeSe powder is vaporized at the hot end of a sealed ampule and allowed to condense at the cold end. Usual crystals are small and show signs of irregular growth, caused mainly by convective motion in the gaseous medium. However, GeSe grown under condition of zero-gravity and reduced convection aboard the Skylab are ~10 times larger than Earth-grown crystals, and are free from visual defects.
