= Transition metal complexes of carbon disulfide =

Transition metal complexes of carbon disulfide are coordination complexes containing carbon disulfide as a ligand. Carbon disulfide is a well established commodity chemical with extensive reactivity, so it is logical that its interactions with metal complexes have been investigated.

In terms of ligand properties, carbon disulfide has no Lewis basicity. It is weakly electrophilic as shown by its reduction and its reactions with amines. It follows logically that carbon disulfide reacts with electron-rich complexes.

== η^{2}-CS_{2} complexes ==
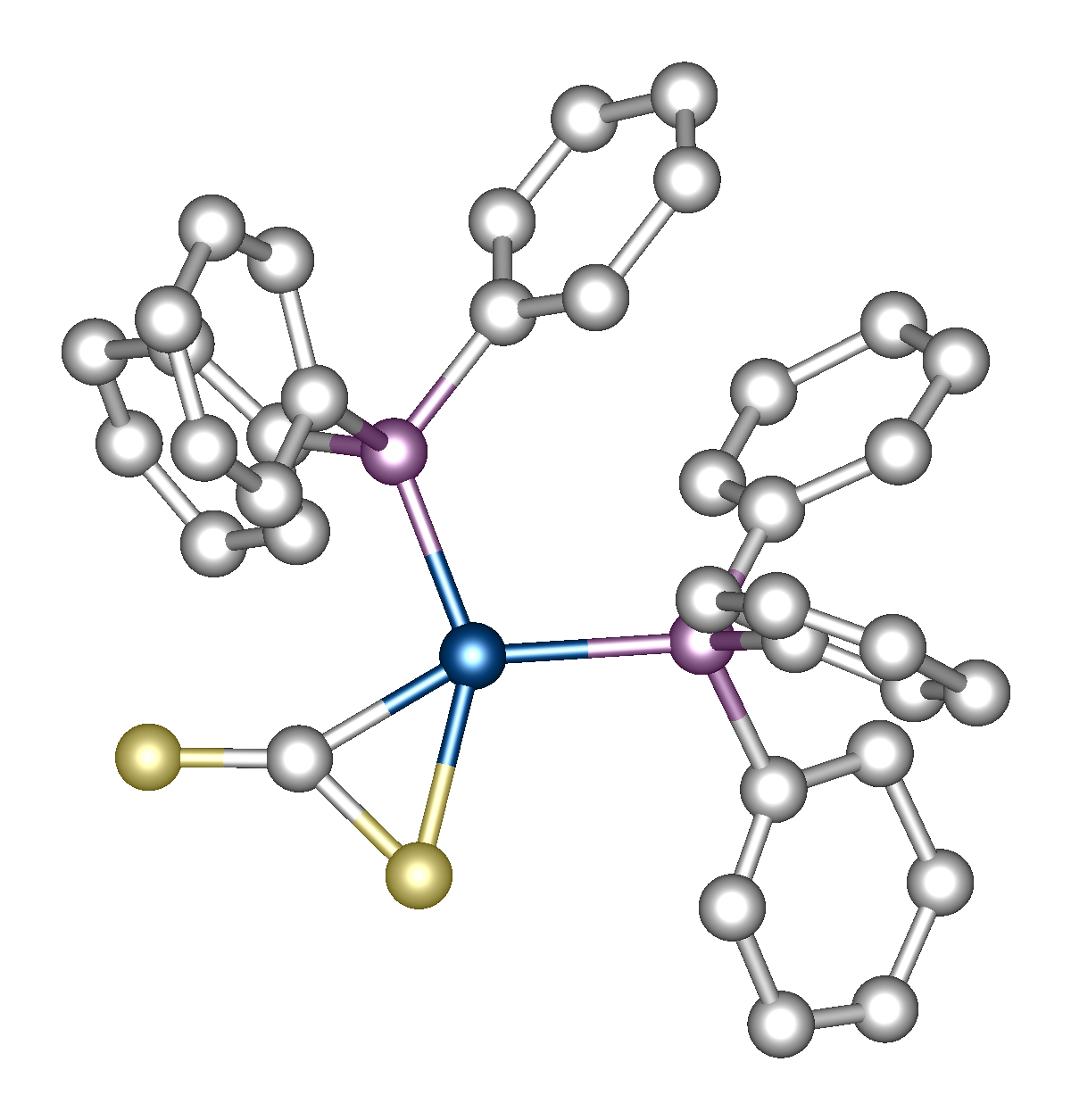
Structure of Pt(η^{2}-CS_{2})[P(C_{6}H_{5})_{3}]_{2}. Color code: blue = Pt, yellow = S, violet = P. Hydrogen atoms are not shown.

The history of this area begins with the reaction of zero-valent M[P(C_{6}H_{5})_{3}]_{3} with CS_{2} (M = Pd, Pt) to give M(η^{2}-CS_{2})[P(C_{6}H_{5})_{3}]_{2}. The resulting complex is square planar. The metal-bound C–S distance is 171 pm, and the exo C=S bond length is 154 pm, almost identical to that of free carbon disulfide. The S–C–S is bent, with an angle of 136°. Many related complexes are known, including a derivative of vanadocene (C_{5}H_{5})_{2}V(η^{2}-CS_{2}) and the iron-trimethylphosphine complex Fe(P(CH_{3})_{3})_{2}(CO)_{2}(η^{2}-CS_{2}).

== Reactions ==
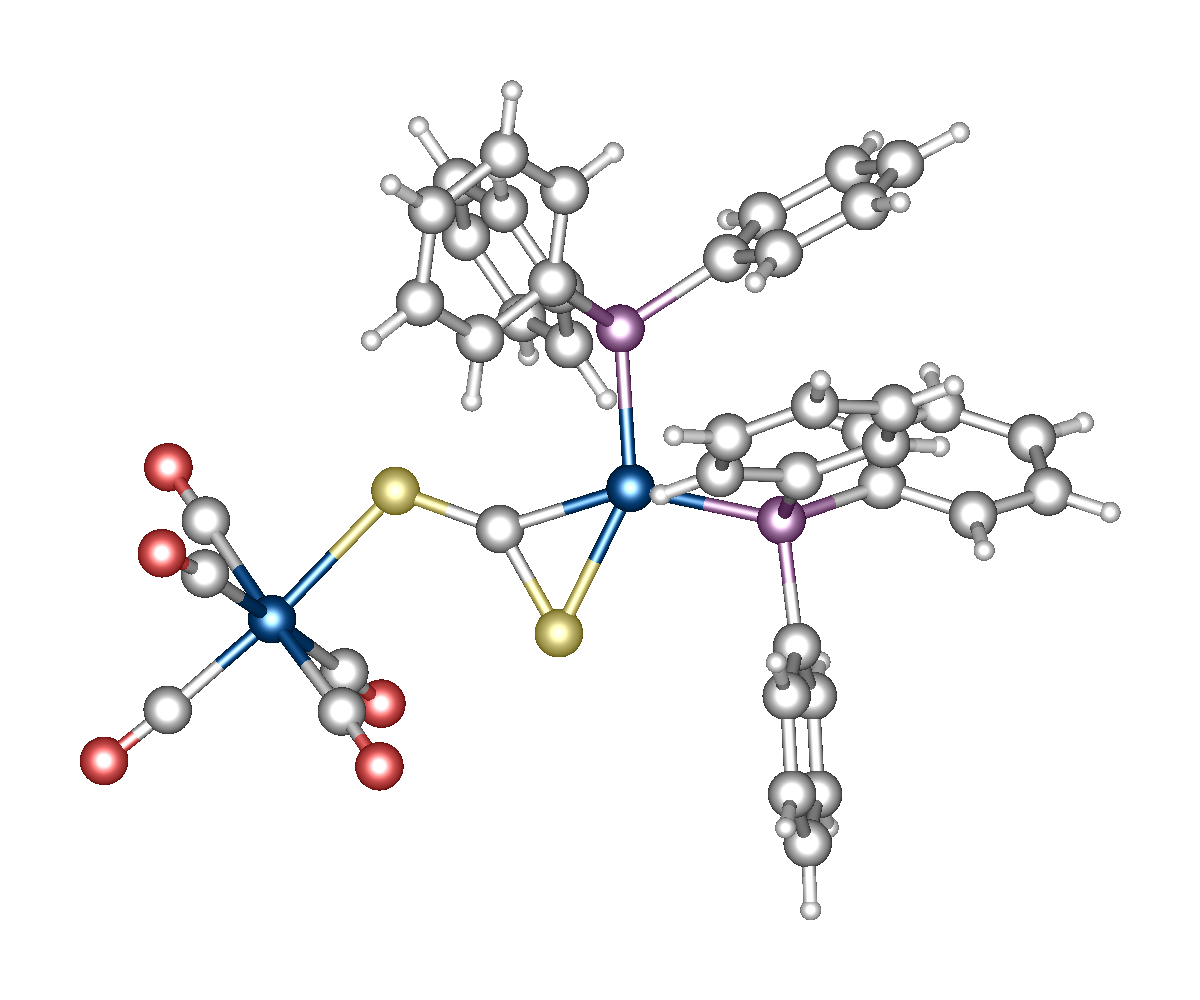
Structure of W(CO)_{5} adduct of Pt(η^{2}-CS_{2})[P(C_{6}H_{5})_{3}]_{2} Color code: blue = Pt, yellow = S, violet = P, red = O

The exo sulfur of η^{2}-CS_{2} complexes is basic. This effect manifested in the formation of bimetallic complexes where CS_{2} is a bridging ligand.

Pt(CS_{2})[P(C_{6}H_{5})_{3}]_{2} + W(CO)_{5}(thf) → Pt(CS_{2})[P(C_{6}H_{5})_{3}]_{2}W(CO)_{5} + thf

In some cases, carbon disulfide is a precursor to thiocarbonyl complexes. An early example resulted from the dissolution of Wilkinson's catalyst in CS_{2}:

RhCl(P(C_{6}H_{5})_{3})_{3} + CS_{2} → RhCl(CS)(P(C_{6}H_{5})_{3})_{2} + SP(C_{6}H_{5})_{3}

This transformation may proceed by the intermediacy of a CS_{2} complex.

A host of structurally complex derivatives have been obtained from treating carbon disulfide with iron and cobalt carbonyls.

=== C–C coupling ===
Treating titanocene dicarbonyl with carbon disulfide gives the tetrathiooxalate derivative:

2 (C_{5}H_{5})_{2}Ti(CO)_{2} + 2 CS_{2} → [(C_{5}H_{5})_{2}Ti]_{2}(C_{2}S_{4}) + 4 CO

A related example is the ethylenetetrathiolate C_{2}S_{4}(Fe_{2}(CO)_{6})_{2} derived from iron carbonyls and carbon disulfide.
