= Tin telluride =

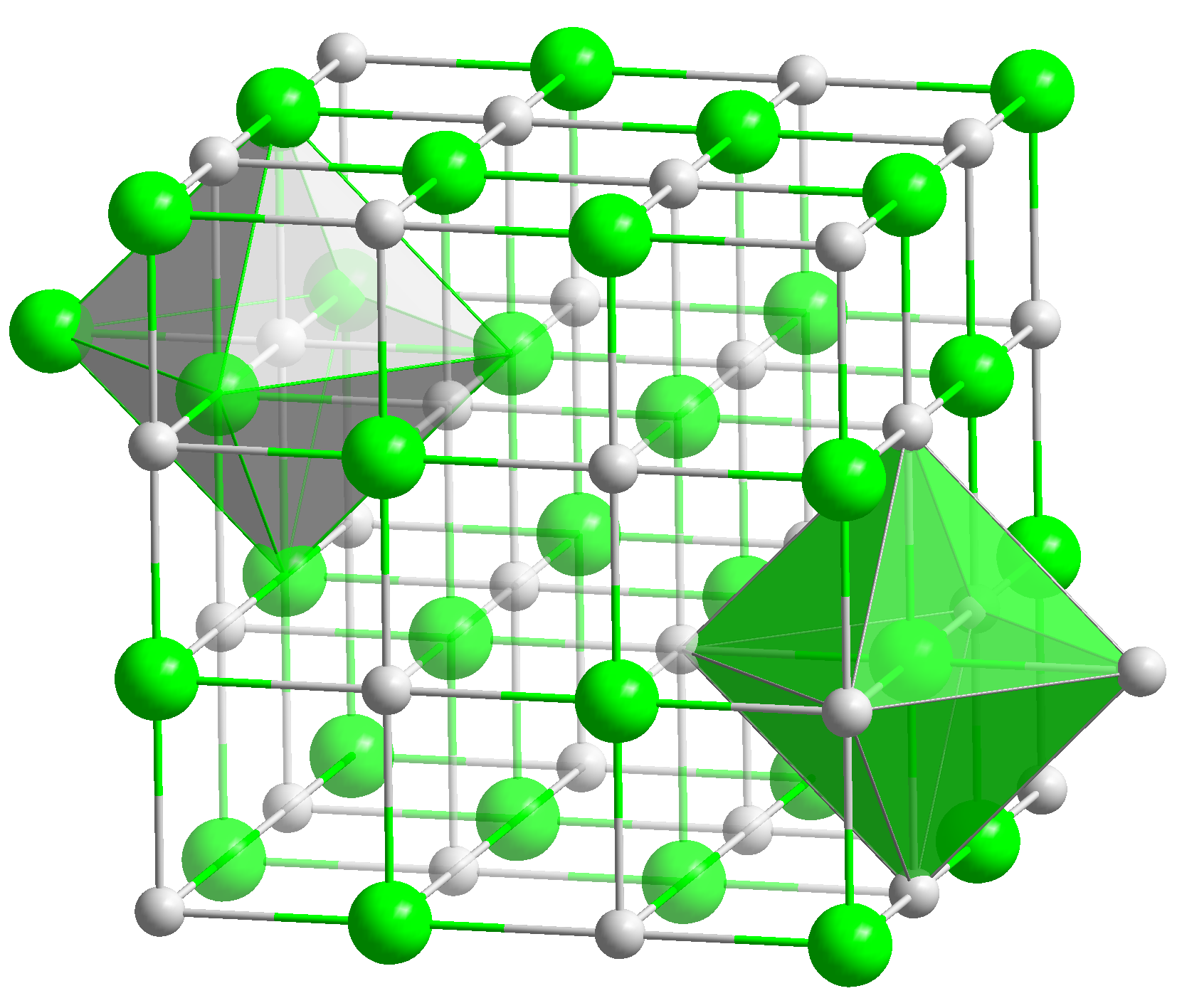

Names
- IUPAC name Tin telluride
- Other names Tin(II) telluride, Stannous telluride

Identifiers
CAS Number	12040-02-7
3D model (JSmol)	Interactive image
ChemSpider	4937267
ECHA InfoCard	100.031.728
EC Number	234-914-8
PubChem CID	6432000
CompTox Dashboard (EPA)	DTXSID40894844
- InChI: InChI=1S/Sn.Te Key: WYUZTTNXJUJWQQ-UHFFFAOYSA-N
- SMILES: [Sn]=[Te]

Properties
Chemical formula	SnTe
Molar mass	246.31 g/mol
Appearance	gray cubic crystals
Density	6.445 g/cm^{3}
Melting point	790 °C (1,450 °F; 1,060 K)
Band gap	0.18 eV
Electron mobility	500 cm^{2} V^{−1} s^{−1}

Structure
Crystal structure	Halite (cubic), cF_{8}
Space group	Fm3̅m, No. 225
Lattice constant	a = 0.63 nm
Coordination geometry	Octahedral (Sn^{2+}); Octahedral (Se^{2−})

Thermochemistry
Heat capacity (C)	185 J K^{−1} kg^{−1}

Related compounds
Other anions	Tin(II) oxide Tin(II) sulfide Tin selenide
Other cations	Carbon monotelluride Silicon monotelluride Germanium telluride Lead telluride
- Except where otherwise noted, data are given for materials in their standard state (at 25 °C [77 °F], 100 kPa). verify (what is ?) Infobox references

Tin telluride is a compound of tin and tellurium (SnTe); is a IV-VI narrow band gap semiconductor and has direct band gap of 0.18 eV. It is often alloyed with lead to make lead tin telluride, which is used as an infrared detector material.

Tin telluride normally forms p-type semiconductor (Extrinsic semiconductor) due to tin vacancies and is a low temperature superconductor.

SnTe exists in three crystal phases. At Low temperatures, where the concentration of hole carriers is less than 1.5 × 10^{20} cm^{−3} , Tin Telluride exists in rhombohedral phase also known as α-SnTe. At room temperature and atmospheric pressure, Tin Telluride exists in NaCl-like cubic crystal phase, known as β-SnTe. While at 18 kbar pressure, β-SnTe transforms to γ-SnTe, orthorhombic phase, space group Pnma. This phase change is characterized by 11 percent increase in density and 360 percent increase in resistance for γ-SnTe.

Tin telluride is a thermoelectric material. Theoretical studies imply that the n-type performance may be particularly good.

== Thermal properties ==
- Standard enthalpy of formation: - 14.6 ± 0.3 kcal/mole at 298 K
- Standard Enthalpy of sublimation: 52.1 ± 1.4 kcal/mole at 298 K
- Heat capacity: 12.1 + 2.1 × 10^{−3} T cal/deg
- Bond-dissociation energy for the reaction SnTe(g)-> Sn(g)+ Te(g) : 80.6 ± 1.5 kcal/mole at 298 K
- Entropy: 24.2±0.1 cal/mole.deg
- Enthalpy of Dimerization for the reaction Sn_{2}Te_{2}->2SnTe(g) :46.9 ± 6.0 kcal/mole

== Applications ==
Generally Pb is alloyed with SnTe in order to access interesting optical and electronic properties, In addition, as a result of Quantum confinement, the band gap of the SnTe increases beyond the bulk band gap, covering the mid-IR wavelength range. The alloyed material has been used in mid- IR photodetectors and thermoelectric generator.
