= Germanium selenide =

Germanium selenide may refer to:

- Germanium monoselenide
- Germanium diselenide
