= Tin selenide =

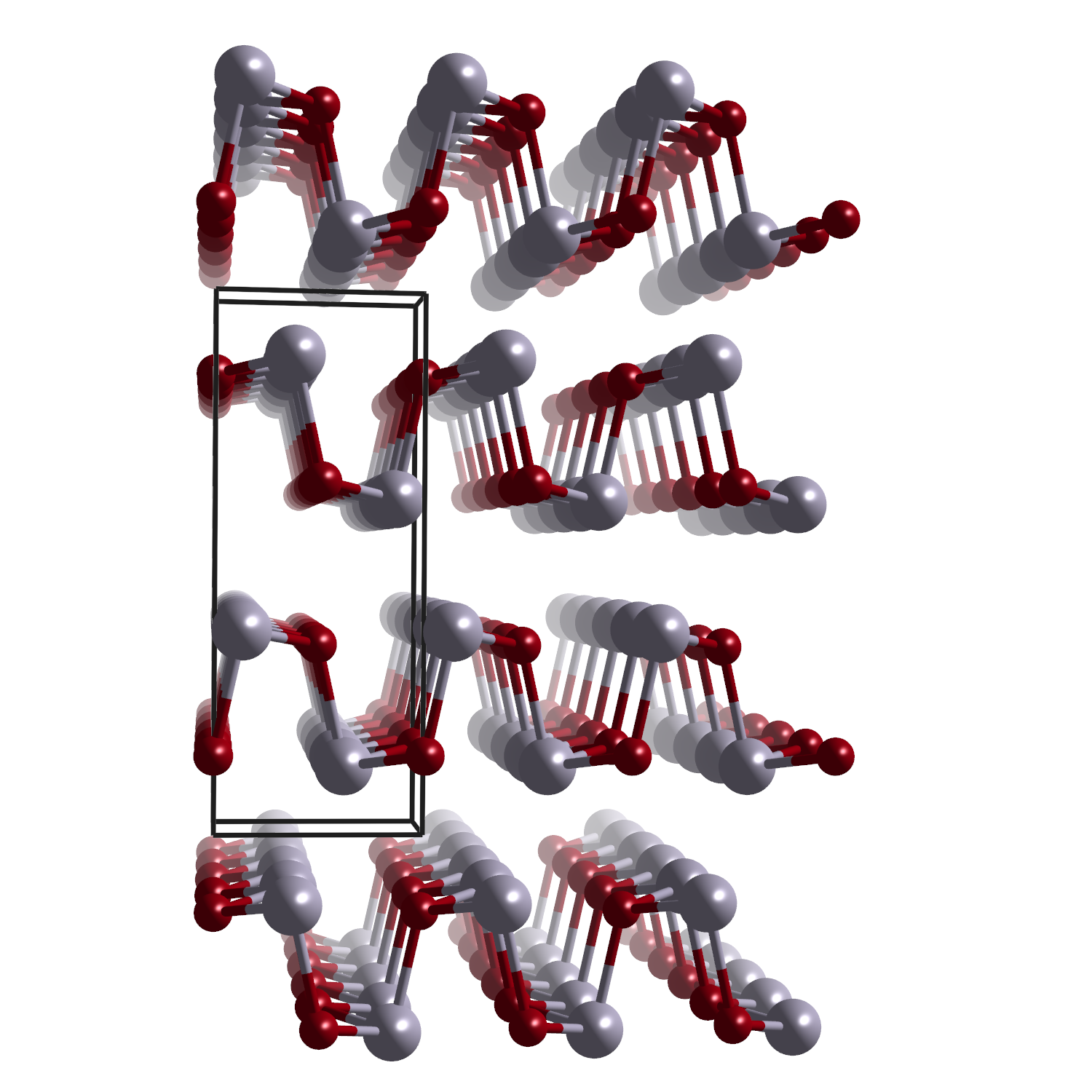

Names
- Other names Tin(II) selenide

Identifiers
CAS Number	1315-06-6
3D model (JSmol)	Interactive image
ChemSpider	4937309
ECHA InfoCard	100.013.871
EC Number	215-257-6
PubChem CID	6432049
UNII	M1PQ79637Y
- InChI: InChI=1S/Se.Sn Key: MFIWAIVSOUGHLI-UHFFFAOYSA-N; InChI=1S/Se.Sn
- SMILES: [Se]=[Sn]

Properties
Chemical formula	SnSe
Molar mass	197.67 g/mol
Appearance	steel gray odorless powder
Density	5.75 g/cm^{3}
Melting point	861 °C (1,582 °F; 1,134 K)
Solubility in water	negligible
Band gap	0.9 eV (indirect), 1.3 eV (direct)

Structure
Crystal structure	Orthorhombic, oP8
Space group	Pnma, No. 62
Lattice constant	a = 4.4 Å, b = 4.2 Å, c = 11.5 Å

Thermochemistry
Std enthalpy of formation (Δ_{f}H^{⦵}_{298})	−88.7 kJ/mol

Hazards
- GHS labelling
Pictograms	(GHS06: Toxic) (GHS08: Health hazard) (GHS09: Environmental hazard)
Signal word	Danger
Hazard statements	H301, H331, H373, H410
Precautionary statements	P260, P264, P270, P271, P273, P301+P310, P304+P340, P311, P314, P321, P330, P391, P403+P233, P405, P501
NFPA 704 (fire diamond)	2 1 1
Safety data sheet (SDS)	https://www.ltschem.com/msds/SnSe.pdf

Related compounds
Other anions	Tin(II) oxide Tin(II) sulfide Tin telluride
Other cations	Carbon monoselenide Silicon monoselenide Germanium selenide Lead selenide
- Except where otherwise noted, data are given for materials in their standard state (at 25 °C [77 °F], 100 kPa). verify (what is ?) Infobox references

Tin selenide, also known as stannous selenide, is an inorganic compound with the formula SnSe. Tin(II) selenide is a narrow band-gap (IV-VI) semiconductor structurally analogous to black phosphorus. It has received considerable interest for possible applications including low-cost photovoltaics, and memory-switching devices. Because of its low thermal conductivity as well as reasonable electrical conductivity, tin selenide is one of the most efficient thermoelectric materials.

== Structure ==
α-SnSe is classified as a layered metal chalcogenide. It includes a group 16 anion (Se^{2−}) and an electropositive element (Sn^{2+}), and is arranged in a layered structure. Tin(II) selenide (SnSe) crystallizes in the orthorhombic structure that is related to the rock-salt structure. It is isomorphous to germanium selenide (GeSe). The unit cell encompasses two inverted layers. Each tin atom is covalently bonded to three neighboring selenium atoms, and each selenium atom is covalently bonded to three neighboring tin atoms. The layers are held together primarily by van der Waals forces. At temperatures above 800 K (527 °C) its structure changes to rock-salt structure.

At pressures above 58 GPa, SnSe acts as a superconductor; this change of conductivity is likely due to a change in the structure to that of CsCl. Another polymorph is based upon the cubic and orthorhombic crystal system is known as π-SnSe (space group: P213, No. 198). A γ-SnSe phase has also been reported (space group: Pnma, No. 62).

== Synthesis ==
Tin(II) selenide can be formed by combining the elements tin and selenium above 623 K (350 °C).

Problems with the composition are encountered during synthesis. Two phases exist—the hexagonal SnSe_{2} phase and the orthorhombic SnSe phase. Specific nanostructures can be synthesized, but few 2D nanostructures have been prepared. Both square SnSe nanostructures and single-layer SnSe nanostructures have been prepared. Historically, phase-controlled synthesis of 2D tin selenide nanostructures is quite difficult.

Sheet-like nanocrystalline SnSe with an orthorhombic phase has been prepared with good purity and crystallization via a reaction between a selenium alkaline aqueous solution and tin(II) complex at room temperature under atmospheric pressure. A few-atom-thick SnSe nanowires can be grown inside narrow (~1 nm diameter) single-wall carbon nanotubes by heating the nanotubes with SnSe powder in vacuum at 1,230 K (960 °C). Contrary to the bulk SnSe, they have the cubic crystal structure.

== Use in energy harvesting ==
Tin(II) selenide has been considered for thermoelectric applications. SnSe has exhibited the highest thermoelectric material efficiency, measured by the unitless ZT parameter, of any known material (~2.62 along the b axis and ~2.3 along the c axis at 923 K (650 °C)). When coupled with the Carnot efficiency for heat conversion, the overall energy conversion efficiency of approximately 25%. Its high efficiency is most likely due to low thermal conductivity of the crystal, the electronic structure may have as important role: SnSe has highly anisotropic valence band structure, which consists of multiple valleys that act as independent channels for very mobile, low effective-mass charge transport within, and heavy-carrier conductivity perpendicular to the layers. While, historically, lead telluride and silicon-germanium have been used, these materials suffer from high thermal conductivity.

At room temperature, the crystal structure of SnSe is Pnma. However, at ~750 K (477 °C), it undergoes a phase transition that results in a higher symmetry Cmcm structure. This phase transition preserves many of the advantageous transport properties of SnSe. The dynamic structural behavior of SnSe involving the reversible phase transition helps to preserve the high power factor. The Cmcm phase, which is structurally related to the low temperature Pnma phase, exhibits a substantially reduced energy gap and enhanced carrier mobilities while maintaining the ultralow thermal conductivity thus yielding the record ZT. Because of SnSe's layered structure, which does not conduct heat well, one end of the SnSe single crystal can get hot while the other remains cool. This idea can be paralleled with the idea of a posture-pedic mattress that does not transfer vibrations laterally. In SnSe, the ability of crystal vibrations (also known as phonons) to propagate through the material is significantly hampered. This means heat can only travel due to hot carriers (an effect that can be approximated by the Wiedemann–Franz law), a heat transport mechanism that is much less significant to the total thermal conductivity. Thus the hot end can stay hot while the cold end remains cold, maintaining the temperature gradient needed for thermoelectric device operation. The poor ability to carry heat through its lattice enables the resulting record high thermoelectric conversion efficiency. The previously reported nanostructured all-scale hierarchical PbTe-4SrTe-2Na (with a ZT of 2.2) exhibits a lattice thermal conductivity of 0.5 W m^{−1} K^{−1}. The unprecedentedly high ZT ~2.6 of SnSe arises primarily from an even lower lattice thermal conductivity of 0.23 W m^{−1} K^{−1}. However, in order to take advantage of this ultralow lattice thermal conductivity, the synthesis method must result in macroscale single crystals as p-type polycrystalline SnSe has been shown to have a significantly reduced ZT. Enhancement in the figure of merit above a relatively high value of 2.5 can have sweeping ramifications for commercial applications especially for materials using less expensive, more Earth-abundant elements that are devoid of lead and tellurium (two materials that have been prevalent in the thermoelectric materials industry for the past couple decades).

=== Other possible uses ===
Tin selenides may be used for optoelectronic devices, solar cells, memory switching devices, and anodes for lithium-ion batteries.

Tin(II) selenide has potential as a solid-state lubricant, due to the nature of its interlayer bonding. It is not the most stable of the chalcogenide solid-state lubricants, as tungsten diselenide has much weaker interplanar bonding, is highly chemically inert and has high stability in high-temperature, high-vacuum environments.
