= Lead(II) sulfide =

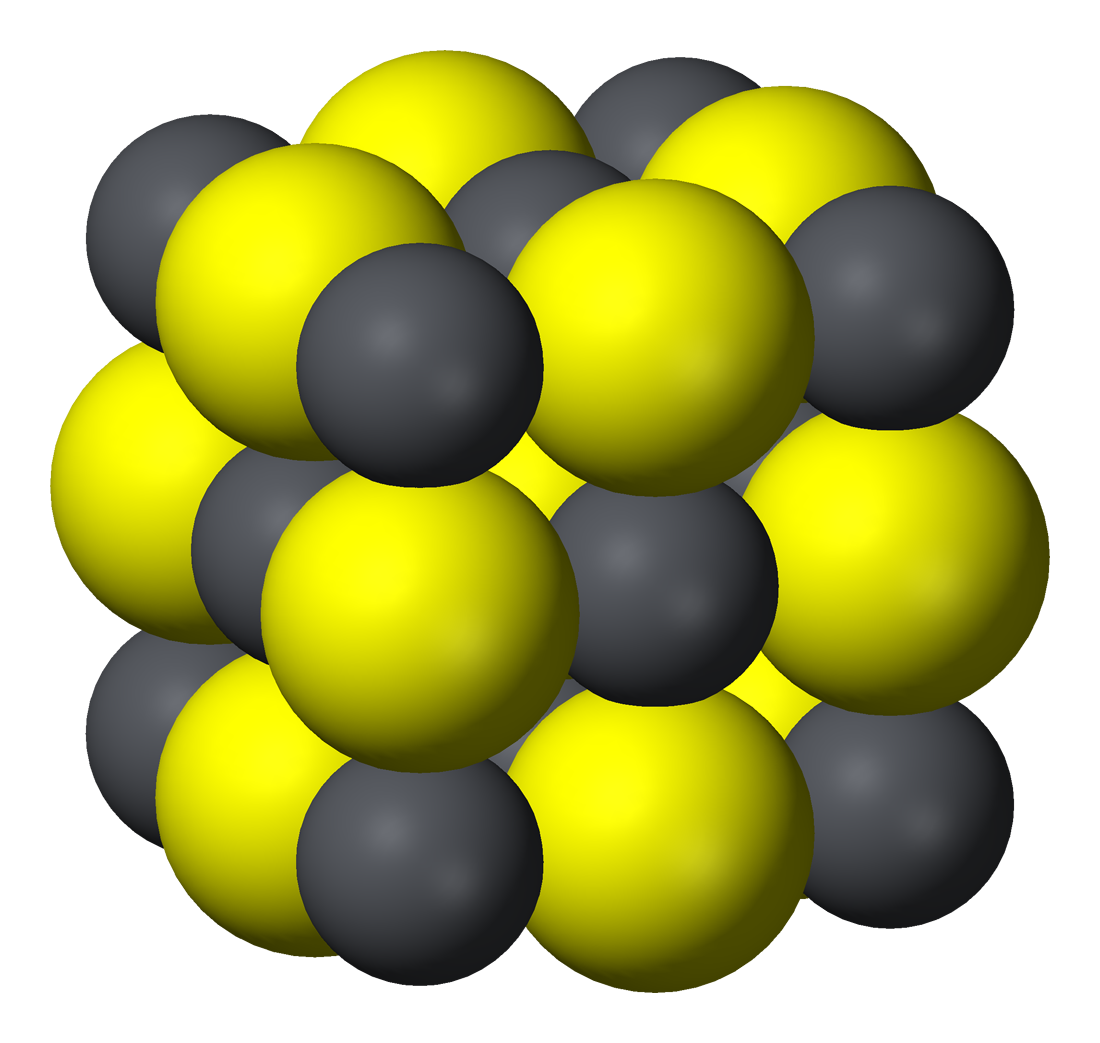

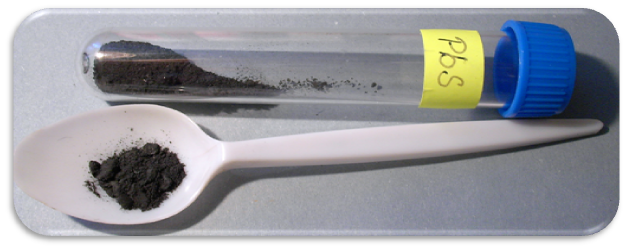

Names
- Other names Plumbous sulfide Galena, Sulphuret of lead

Identifiers
CAS Number	1314-87-0
3D model (JSmol)	Interactive image
ChemSpider	14135
ECHA InfoCard	100.013.861
EC Number	215-246-6
PubChem CID	14819
RTECS number	OG4550000
UNII	2425D15SYM
UN number	3077
CompTox Dashboard (EPA)	DTXSID401352852 DTXSID0025498, DTXSID401352852
- InChI: InChI=1S/Pb.S Key: XCAUINMIESBTBL-UHFFFAOYSA-N
- SMILES: [Pb]=S

Properties
Chemical formula	PbS
Molar mass	239.30 g/mol
Appearance	Black
Density	7.60 g/cm^{3}
Melting point	1,113 °C (2,035 °F; 1,386 K)
Boiling point	1,281 °C (2,338 °F; 1,554 K)
Solubility in water	2.6×10^{−11} kg/kg (calculated, at pH=7) 8.6×10^{−7} kg/kg
Magnetic susceptibility (χ)	−83.6·10^{−6} cm^{3}/mol
Refractive index (n_{D})	3.91

Structure
Crystal structure	Halite (cubic), cF8
Space group	Fm3̅m, No. 225
Lattice constant	a = 5.936 Å
Formula units (Z)	4
Coordination geometry	Octahedral (Pb^{2+}); Octahedral (S^{2−})
Dipole moment	3.59 D

Thermochemistry
Heat capacity (C)	49.5 J/mol⋅K
Std molar entropy (S^{⦵}_{298})	91.2 J/mol
Std enthalpy of formation (Δ_{f}H^{⦵}_{298})	−100.4 kJ/mol
Gibbs free energy (Δ_{f}G^{⦵})	−98.7 kJ/mol

Hazards
- GHS labelling
Pictograms	(GHS07: Exclamation mark) (GHS08: Health hazard) (GHS09: Environmental hazard)
Signal word	Danger
Hazard statements	H302, H332, H360, H373, H410
Precautionary statements	P201, P202, P260, P264, P270, P271, P273, P281, P301+P312, P304+P312, P304+P340, P308+P313, P312, P314, P330, P391, P405, P501
NFPA 704 (fire diamond)	2 0 0
Flash point	Non-flammable
Safety data sheet (SDS)	External MSDS

Related compounds
Other anions	Lead(II) oxide Lead selenide Lead telluride
Other cations	Carbon monosulfide Silicon monosulfide Germanium(II) sulfide Tin(II) sulfide
Related compounds	Thallium sulfide Lead(IV) sulfide Bismuth sulfide
- Except where otherwise noted, data are given for materials in their standard state (at 25 °C [77 °F], 100 kPa). verify (what is ?) Infobox references

Lead(II) sulfide (also spelled sulphide) is an inorganic compound with the formula PbS. It occurs naturally as galena, the principal ore and the most important compound of lead. It is a semiconducting material with niche uses.

== Formation, basic properties, related materials ==
Addition of hydrogen sulfide or sulfide salts to a solution containing a lead salt, such as PbCl_{2}, gives a black precipitate of lead sulfide.

Pb^{2+} + H_{2}S → PbS↓ + 2 H^{+}

This reaction is used in qualitative inorganic analysis. The presence of hydrogen sulfide or sulfide ions may be tested using "lead acetate paper."

Like the related materials PbSe and PbTe, PbS is a semiconductor. In fact, lead sulfide was one of the earliest materials to be used as a semiconductor. Lead sulfide crystallizes in the sodium chloride motif, unlike many other IV-VI semiconductors.

Since PbS is the main ore of lead, much effort has focused on its conversion. A major process involves smelting of PbS followed by reduction of the resulting oxide. Idealized equations for these two steps are:

2 PbS + 3 O_{2} → 2 PbO + 2 SO_{2}
PbO + C → Pb + CO

The sulfur dioxide is converted to sulfuric acid.

=== Nanoparticles ===
Lead sulfide-containing nanoparticle and quantum dots have been well studied. Traditionally, such materials are produced by combining lead salts with a variety of sulfide sources. In 2009, PbS nanoparticles have been examined for use in solar cells.

== Applications ==
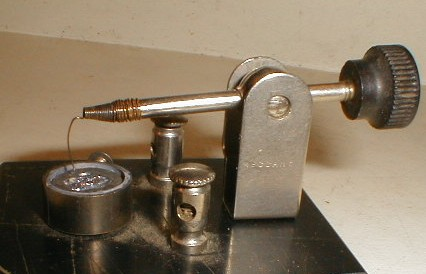
Galena-based cat's-whisker detector used in the early 1900s

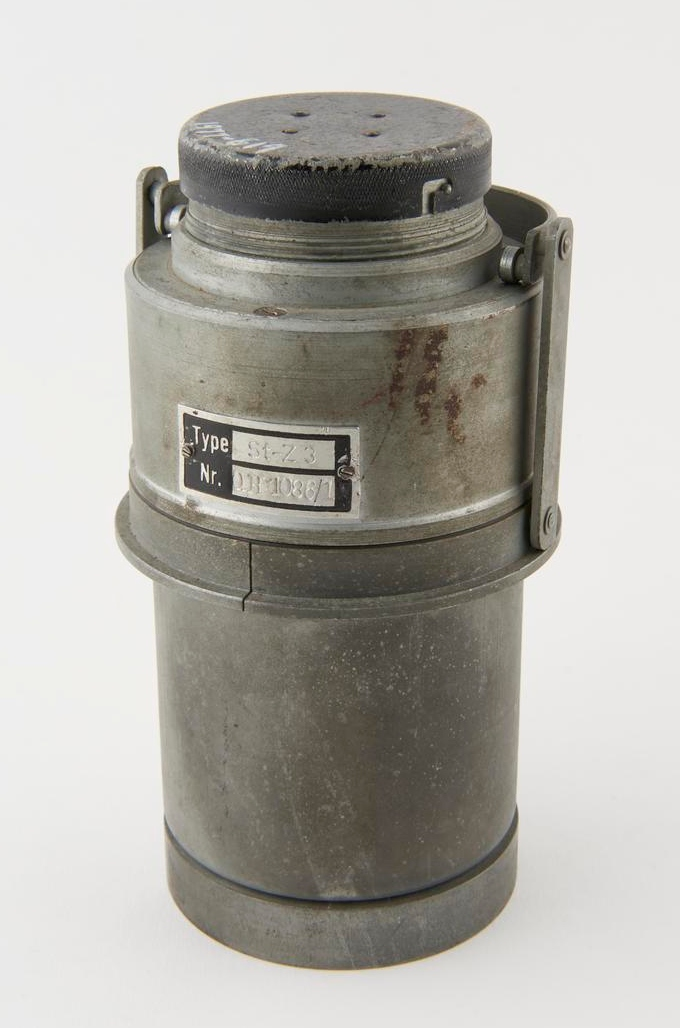
World War II German PbS infrared detector

=== Photodetector ===
PbS was one of the first materials used for electrical diodes that could detect electromagnetic radiation, including infrared light. As an infrared sensor, PbS directly detects light, as opposed to thermal detectors, which respond to a change in detector element temperature caused by the radiation. A PbS element can be used to measure radiation in either of two ways: by measuring the tiny photocurrent the photons cause when they hit the PbS material, or by measuring the change in the material's electrical resistance that the photons cause. Measuring the resistance change is the more commonly used method. At room temperature, PbS is sensitive to radiation at wavelengths between approximately 1 and 2.5 μm. This range corresponds to the shorter wavelengths in the infra-red portion of the spectrum, the so-called short-wavelength infrared (SWIR). Only very hot objects emit radiation in these wavelengths.

Cooling the PbS elements, for example using liquid nitrogen or a Peltier element system, shifts its sensitivity range to between approximately 2 and 4 μm. Objects that emit radiation in these wavelengths still have to be quite hot—several hundred degrees Celsius—but not as hot as those detectable by uncooled sensors. (Other compounds used for this purpose include indium antimonide (InSb) and mercury-cadmium telluride (HgCdTe), which have somewhat better properties for detecting the longer IR wavelengths.) The high dielectric constant of PbS leads to relatively slow detectors (compared to silicon, germanium, InSb, or HgCdTe).

== Planetary science ==
In 2008 it was reported that elevations above 2.6 kilometres (1.6 mi) on the planet Venus are coated with a shiny substance. Though the composition of this coat is not entirely certain, one theory is that Venus "snows" crystallized lead sulfide much as Earth snows frozen water. If this is the case, it would be the first time the substance was identified on a foreign planet. Other less likely candidates for Venus' "snow" are bismuth sulfide and tellurium.

== Safety ==
Lead(II) sulfide is so insoluble that it is almost nontoxic, but pyrolysis of the material, as in smelting, gives dangerous toxic fumes of lead and oxides of sulfur. Lead sulfide is insoluble and a stable compound in the pH of blood and so is probably one of the less toxic forms of lead. A large safety risk occurs in the synthesis of PbS using lead carboxylates, as they are particularly soluble and can cause negative physiological conditions.

== Cited sources ==
- Haynes, William M., ed. (2016). CRC Handbook of Chemistry and Physics (97th ed.). CRC Press. ISBN 9781498754293.
