= Tin(II) oxide =

Chemical compound, stannous oxide (SnO)

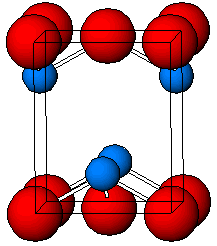

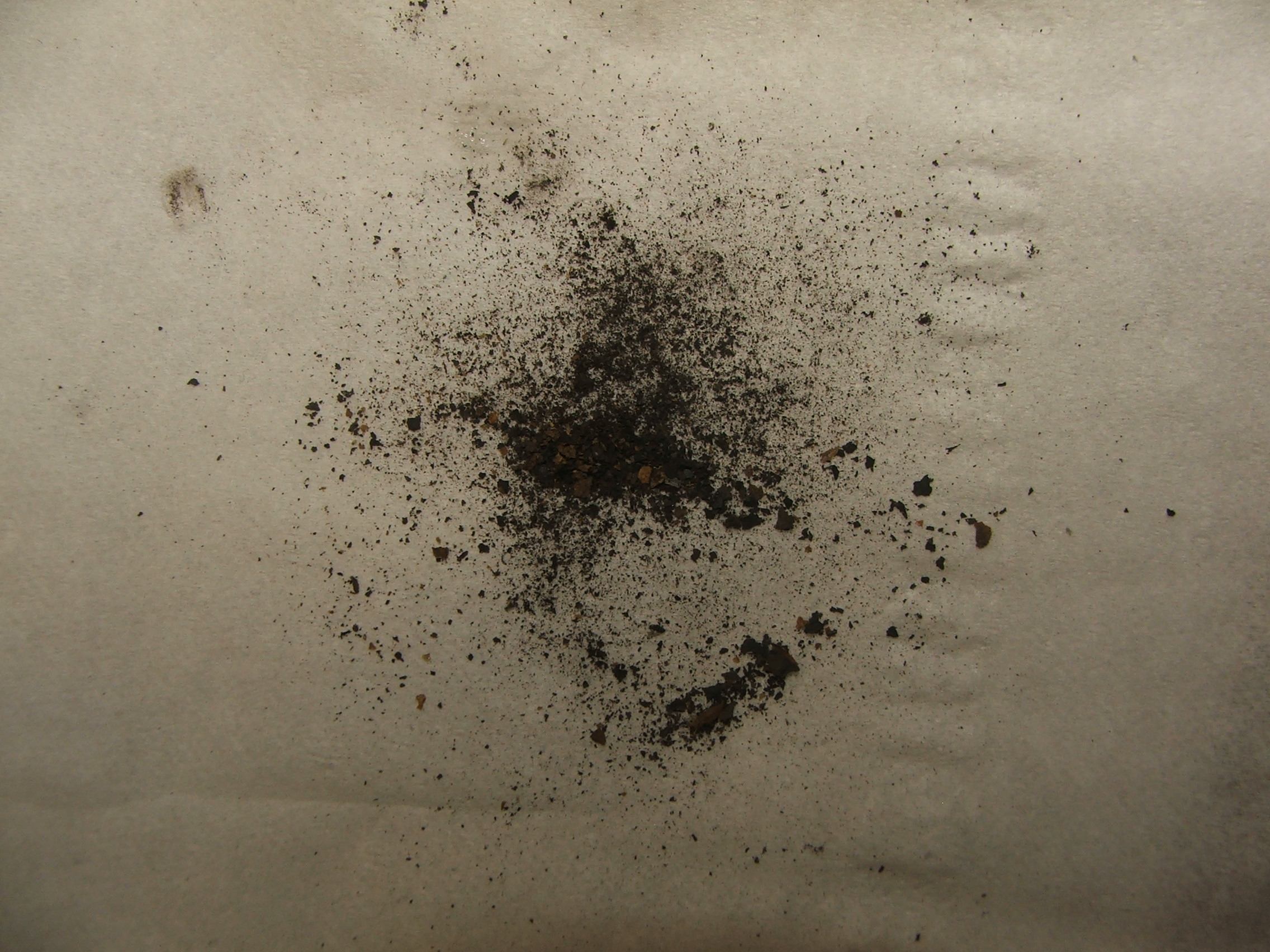

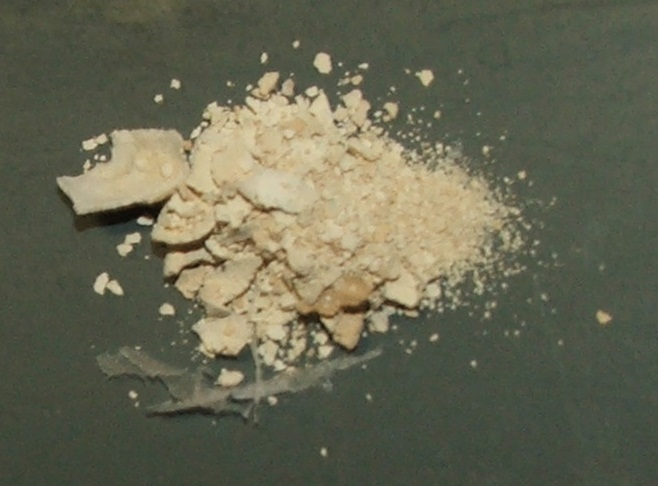

Names
- IUPAC name Tin(II) oxide
- Other names Stannous oxide Tin monoxide

Identifiers
CAS Number	21651-19-4
3D model (JSmol)	Interactive image
ChemSpider	80298
ECHA InfoCard	100.040.439
EC Number	244-499-5
PubChem CID	88989
RTECS number	XQ3700000
UNII	JB2MV9I3LS
CompTox Dashboard (EPA)	DTXSID2066723
- InChI: InChI=1S/O.Sn Key: QHGNHLZPVBIIPX-UHFFFAOYSA-N
- SMILES: O=[Sn]

Properties
Chemical formula	SnO
Molar mass	134.709 g·mol^{−1}
Appearance	black or red powder when anhydrous, white when hydrated
Density	6.45 g/cm^{3}
Melting point	1,080 °C (1,980 °F; 1,350 K)
Solubility in water	insoluble
Magnetic susceptibility (χ)	−19.0·10^{−6} cm^{3}/mol

Structure
Crystal structure	tetragonal

Thermochemistry
Std molar entropy (S^{⦵}_{298})	56 J·mol^{−1}·K^{−1}
Std enthalpy of formation (Δ_{f}H^{⦵}_{298})	−285 kJ·mol^{−1}

Hazards
Flash point	Non-flammable
- NIOSH (US health exposure limits)
PEL (Permissible)	none
REL (Recommended)	TWA 2 mg/m^{3}
IDLH (Immediate danger)	N.D.
Safety data sheet (SDS)	ICSC 0956

Related compounds
Other anions	Tin sulfide Tin selenide Tin telluride
Other cations	Carbon monoxide Silicon monoxide Germanium(II) oxide Lead(II) oxide
Related tin oxides	Tin dioxide
- Except where otherwise noted, data are given for materials in their standard state (at 25 °C [77 °F], 100 kPa). verify (what is ?) Infobox references

Tin(II) oxide (stannous oxide) is a compound with the formula SnO. It is composed of tin and oxygen where tin has the oxidation state of +2. There are two forms, a stable blue-black form and a metastable red form.

== Preparation and reactions ==
Blue-black SnO can be produced by heating the tin(II) oxide hydrate, SnO·xH_{2}O (x < 1) precipitated when a tin(II) salt is reacted with an alkali hydroxide such as NaOH.
Metastable, red SnO can be prepared by gentle heating of the precipitate produced by the action of aqueous ammonia on a tin(II) salt.
SnO may be prepared as a pure substance in the laboratory, by controlled heating of tin(II) oxalate (stannous oxalate) in the absence of air or under a CO_{2} atmosphere. This method is also applied to the production of ferrous oxide and manganous oxide.

SnC_{2}O_{4}·2H_{2}O → SnO + CO_{2} + CO + 2 H_{2}O

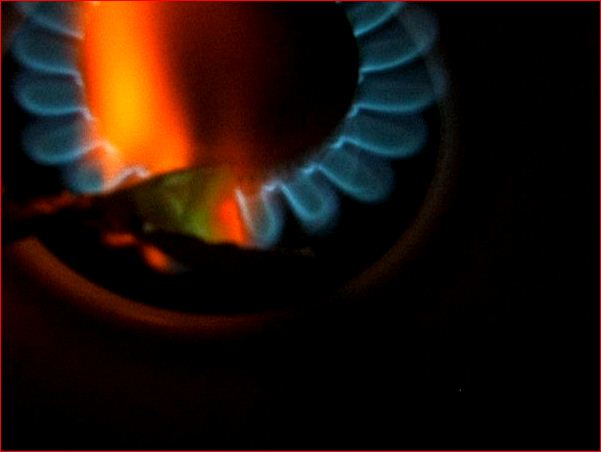
Tin(II) oxide burning

Tin(II) oxide burns in air with a dim green flame to form SnO_{2}.

2 SnO + O_{2} → 2 SnO_{2}

When heated in an inert atmosphere initially disproportionation occurs giving Sn metal and Sn_{3}O_{4} which further reacts to give SnO_{2} and Sn metal.

4SnO → Sn_{3}O_{4} + Sn
Sn_{3}O_{4} → 2SnO_{2} + Sn

SnO is amphoteric, dissolving in strong acid to give tin(II) salts and in strong base to give stannites containing Sn(OH)_{3}^{−}. It can be dissolved in strong acid solutions to give the ionic complexes Sn(OH_{2})_{3}^{2+}and Sn(OH)(OH_{2})_{2}^{+}, and in less acid solutions to give Sn_{3}(OH)_{4}^{2+}. Anhydrous stannites, e.g. K_{2}Sn_{2}O_{3}, K_{2}SnO_{2} are also known.

SnO is a reducing agent and is thought to reduce copper(I) to metallic clusters in the manufacture of so-called "copper ruby glass".

== Structure ==
Black, α-SnO adopts the tetragonal PbO layer structure containing four coordinate square pyramidal tin atoms. This form is found in nature as the rare mineral romarchite. The asymmetry is usually simply ascribed to a sterically active lone pair; however, electron density calculations show that the asymmetry is caused by an antibonding interaction of the Sn(5s) and the O(2p) orbitals. The electronic structure and chemistry of the lone pair determines most of the properties of the material.

Non-stoichiometry has been observed in SnO.

The electronic band gap has been measured between 2.5eV and 3eV.

== Uses ==
The dominant use of stannous oxide is as a precursor in manufacturing of other, typically divalent, tin compounds or salts. Stannous oxide may also be employed as a reducing agent and in the creation of ruby glass. It has a minor use as an esterification catalyst.

Cerium(III) oxide in ceramic form, together with Tin(II) oxide (SnO) is used for illumination with UV light.

Stannous oxide is also used in electroplating as a source of Sn2+ ions in solid state reactions to produce complex oxides, or in reactions with weak acids to manufacture stannous compounds.
