= Thallium(I) telluride =

Names
- Other names Thallous telluride Dithallium telluride

Identifiers
CAS Number	12040-13-0
3D model (JSmol)	Interactive image
ChemSpider	21241522
ECHA InfoCard	100.031.730
EC Number	234-916-9
PubChem CID	25147463
- InChI: InChI=1S/Te.2Tl/q-2;2*+1 Key: XMGYGYGVPIYZNU-UHFFFAOYSA-N
- SMILES: [Tl][Te][Tl]

Properties
Chemical formula	Tl_{2}Te
Molar mass	536.367 g/mol
Melting point	415 °C (779 °F; 688 K)
- Except where otherwise noted, data are given for materials in their standard state (at 25 °C [77 °F], 100 kPa). verify (what is ?) Infobox references

Thallium(I) telluride (Tl_{2}Te) is a chemical compound of thallium and tellurium. It has a structure related to that of Tl_{5}Te_{3}. This compound is not well characterized. Its existence has only recently been confirmed by differential scanning calorimetry.
