= Lead(IV) sulfide =

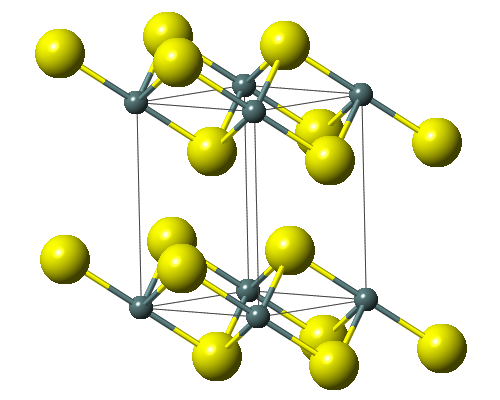

Names
- IUPAC name lead(IV) sulfide
- Other names lead disulfide

Identifiers
CAS Number	12137-74-5
3D model (JSmol)	Interactive image
ChemSpider	23253377
ECHA InfoCard	100.032.025
EC Number	235-241-2
- InChI: InChI=1S/Pb.2S/q+4;2*-2 Key: SRVYZFDAYJNIRQ-UHFFFAOYSA-N
- SMILES: [S-2].[S-2].[Pb+4]

Properties
Chemical formula	PbS_{2}
Molar mass	271.3 g·mol^{−1}

Structure
Crystal structure	Rhombohedral, hP3
Space group	P3̅m1, No. 164
Point group	3̅ 2/m
Lattice constant	a = 3.89 Å, c = 5.91 Å α = 90°, β = 90°, γ = 120°
Coordination geometry	Octahedral (Pb^{4+})
- Except where otherwise noted, data are given for materials in their standard state (at 25 °C [77 °F], 100 kPa). verify (what is ?) Infobox references

Lead(IV) sulfide is a chemical compound with the formula PbS_{2}. This material is generated by the reaction of the more common lead(II) sulfide, PbS, with sulfur at >600 °C and at high pressures. PbS_{2}, like the related tin(IV) sulfide SnS_{2}, crystallises in the cadmium iodide motif, which indicates that Pb should be assigned the formal oxidation state of 4+.

Lead(IV) sulfide is a p-type semiconductor, and is also a thermoelectric material.
