= Lead selenide =

Chemical compound

Names
- Other names Lead(II) selenide Clausthalite

Identifiers
CAS Number	12069-00-0
3D model (JSmol)	Interactive image
ChemSpider	8123400
ECHA InfoCard	100.031.906
EC Number	235-109-4
PubChem CID	61550
CompTox Dashboard (EPA)	DTXSID301315497 DTXSID70433220, DTXSID301315497
- InChI: InChI=1S/Pb.Se Key: GGYFMLJDMAMTAB-UHFFFAOYSA-N
- SMILES: [Se]=[Pb]

Properties
Chemical formula	PbSe
Molar mass	286.16 g/mol
Melting point	1,078 °C (1,972 °F; 1,351 K)

Structure
Crystal structure	Halite (cubic), cF8
Space group	Fm3̅m, No. 225
Lattice constant	a = 6.12 Angstroms
Coordination geometry	Octahedral (Pb^{2+}); Octahedral (Se^{2−})

Hazards
- GHS labelling
Pictograms	(GHS06: Toxic) (GHS07: Exclamation mark) (GHS08: Health hazard) (GHS09: Environmental hazard)
Signal word	Danger
Hazard statements	H301, H302, H331, H332, H360, H373, H410
Precautionary statements	P201, P202, P260, P264, P270, P271, P273, P281, P301+P310, P301+P312, P304+P312, P304+P340, P308+P313, P311, P312, P314, P321, P330, P391, P403+P233, P405, P501

Related compounds
Other anions	Lead(II) oxide Lead(II) sulfide Lead telluride
Other cations	Carbon monoselenide Silicon monoselenide Germanium(II) selenide Tin(II) selenide
Related compounds	Thallium selenide Bismuth selenide
- Except where otherwise noted, data are given for materials in their standard state (at 25 °C [77 °F], 100 kPa). verify (what is ?) Infobox references

Lead selenide (PbSe), or lead(II) selenide, a selenide of lead, is a semiconductor material. It forms cubic crystals of the NaCl structure; it has a direct bandgap of 0.27 eV at room temperature. (Note that incorrectly identifies PbSe and other IV–VI semiconductors as indirect gap materials.) A grey solid, it is used for manufacture of infrared detectors for thermal imaging. The mineral clausthalite is a naturally occurring lead selenide.

It may be formed by direct reaction between its constituent elements, lead and selenium.

== Infrared detection ==
PbSe was one of the first materials found to be sensitive to the infrared radiation used for military applications. Early research works on the material as infrared detector were carried out during the 1930s and the first useful devices were processed by Germans, Americans and British during and just after World War II. Since then, PbSe has been commonly used as an infrared photodetector in multiple applications, from spectrometers for gas and flame detection to infrared fuzes for artillery ammunition or Passive Infrared Cueing systems (PICs).

As a sensitive material to the infrared radiation, PbSe has unique characteristics: it can detect IR radiation of wavelengths from 1.5 to 5.2 μm (mid-wave infrared window, abbreviated MWIR – in some special conditions it is possible to extend its response beyond 6 μm), it has a high detectivity at room temperature (uncooled performance), and due to its quantum nature, it also presents a fast response, which makes this material an excellent candidate as detector of low cost high speed infrared imagers.

=== Theory of operation ===
Lead selenide is a photoconductor material. Its detection mechanism is based on a change of conductivity of a polycrystalline thin-film of the active material when photons are incident. These photons are absorbed inside the PbSe micro-crystals causing then the promotion of electrons from the valence band to the conduction band. Even though it has been extensively studied, the mechanisms responsible of its high detectivity at room temperature are not well understood. What is widely accepted is that the material and the polycrystalline nature of the active thin film play a key role in both the reduction of the Auger mechanism and the reduction of the dark current associated with the presence of multiple intergrain depletion regions and potential barriers inside the polycrystalline thin films.

=== Thermoelectric properties ===
Lead selenide is a thermoelectric material. The material was identified as a potential high temperature thermoelectric with sodium or chlorine doping by Alekseva and co-workers at the A.F. Ioffe Institute in Russia. Subsequent theoretical work at Oak Ridge National Laboratory, USA predicted that its p-type performance could equal or exceed that of the sister compound, lead telluride. Several groups have since reported thermoelectric figures of merit exceeding unity, which is the characteristic of a high performance thermoelectric.

== Manufacture of PbSe infrared detectors ==
Two methods are commonly used to manufacture infrared detectors based on PbSe.

=== Chemical bath deposition (CBD) ===
Chemical bath disposition (CBD) is the standard manufacturing method. It was developed in USA during the '60s and is based on the precipitation of the active material on a substrate rinsed in a controlled bath with selenourea, lead acetate, potassium iodine and other compounds. CBD method has been extensively used during last decades and is still used for processing PbSe infrared detectors. Because of technological limitations associated to this method of processing, nowadays the biggest CBD PbSe detector format commercialized is a linear array of 1x256 elements.

=== Vapour phase deposition (VPD) ===
This processing method is based on the deposition of the active material by thermal evaporation, followed by thermal treatments. This method has an intrinsic advantage compared with the CBD method, which is the compatibility with preprocessed substrates, like silicon CMOS-technology wafers, and the possibility of processing complex detectors, such as the focal plane arrays for imagers. In fact, this has been an important milestone in the last decades concerning the manufacturing of PbSe detectors, as it has opened the technology to the market of uncooled MWIR high-resolution imaging cameras with high frame rates and reduced costs.

=== PbSe Quantum dots based photodetectors ===
Trioctylphosphine selenide and lead acetate react to produce nanophase lead selenide.

Lead selenide nanocrystals embedded into various materials can be used as quantum dots, for example in nanocrystal solar cells.

== See also ==
- Infrared detector
- Black-body radiation
- Hyperspectral imaging
- Infrared camera
- Infrared filter
- Infrared homing
- Infrared signature
- Infrared solar cells
- Infrared spectroscopy
- Other infrared detector materials: Indium antimonide, Indium arsenide, Lead sulfide, QWIP, QDIP, Mercury cadmium telluride, PbS, Microbolometers, InGaAs
