= Lead telluride =

Names
- Other names Lead(II) telluride Altaite

Identifiers
CAS Number	1314-91-6
3D model (JSmol)	Interactive image
ChemSpider	3591410
ECHA InfoCard	100.013.862
EC Number	215-247-1
PubChem CID	4389803
UNII	V1OG6OA4BJ
CompTox Dashboard (EPA)	DTXSID5061663
- InChI: InChI=1S/Pb.Te Key: OCGWQDWYSQAFTO-UHFFFAOYSA-N
- SMILES: [Te]=[Pb]

Properties
Chemical formula	PbTe
Molar mass	334.80 g/mol
Appearance	gray cubic crystals.
Density	8.164 g/cm^{3}
Melting point	924 °C (1,695 °F; 1,197 K)
Solubility in water	insoluble
Band gap	0.25 eV (0 K); 0.32 eV (300 K)
Electron mobility	1600 cm^{2} V^{−1} s^{−1} (0 K); 6000 cm^{2} V^{−1} s^{−1} (300 K)

Structure
Crystal structure	Halite (cubic), cF8
Space group	Fm3̅m, No. 225
Lattice constant	a = 6.46 Angstroms
Coordination geometry	Octahedral (Pb^{2+}); Octahedral (Te^{2−})

Thermochemistry
Std molar entropy (S^{⦵}_{298})	50.5 J·mol^{−1}·K^{−1}
Std enthalpy of formation (Δ_{f}H^{⦵}_{298})	−70.7 kJ·mol^{−1}
Std enthalpy of combustion (Δ_{c}H^{⦵}_{298})	110.0 J·mol^{−1}·K^{−1}

Hazards
- GHS labelling
Pictograms	(GHS07: Exclamation mark) (GHS08: Health hazard) (GHS09: Environmental hazard)
Signal word	Danger
Hazard statements	H302, H332, H351, H360, H373, H410
Precautionary statements	P201, P202, P260, P264, P270, P271, P273, P281, P301+P312, P304+P312, P304+P340, P308+P313, P312, P314, P330, P391, P405, P501
Flash point	Non-flammable
Safety data sheet (SDS)	External MSDS

Related compounds
Other anions	Lead(II) oxide Lead(II) sulfide Lead selenide
Other cations	Carbon monotelluride Silicon monotelluride Germanium telluride Tin telluride
Related compounds	Thallium telluride Bismuth telluride
- Except where otherwise noted, data are given for materials in their standard state (at 25 °C [77 °F], 100 kPa). verify (what is ?) Infobox references

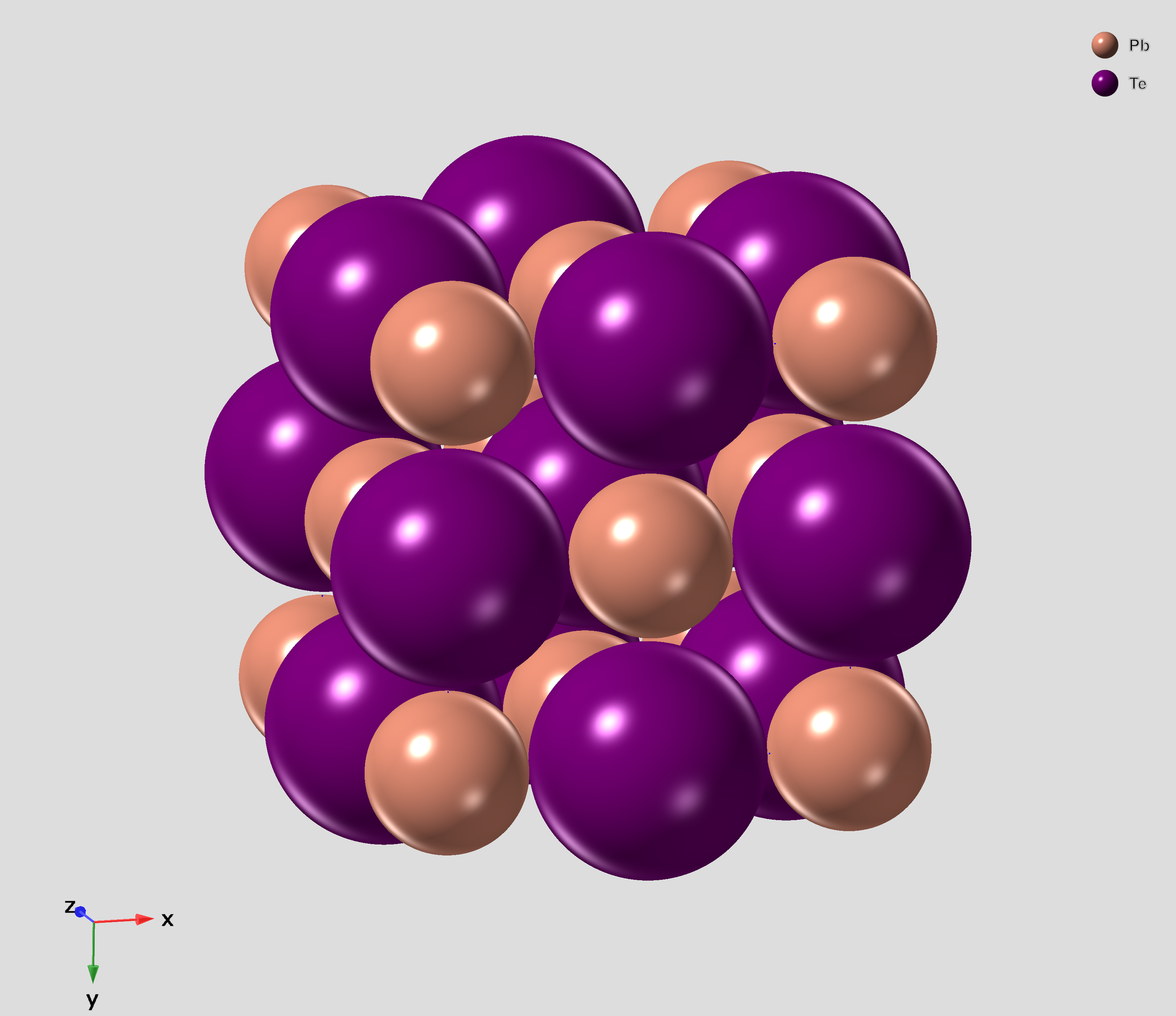
PbTe unit cell

Lead telluride is a compound of lead and tellurium (PbTe). It crystallizes in the NaCl crystal structure with Pb atoms occupying the cation and Te forming the anionic lattice. It is a narrow gap semiconductor with a band gap of 0.32 eV. It occurs naturally as the mineral altaite.

== Properties ==
- Dielectric constant ~1000.
- Electron Effective mass ~ 0.01m_{e}
- Hole mobility, μ_{p} = 600 cm^{2} V^{−1} s^{−1} (0 K); 4000 cm^{2} V^{−1} s^{−1} (300 K)
- Seebeck coefficient: ~326 μV/K (undoped, at 300K), ~200 μV/K (Ag-doped)

== Applications ==
PbTe has proven to be a very important intermediate thermoelectric material. The performance of thermoelectric materials can be evaluated by the figure of merit, $ZT=S^2\sigma T/\kappa$, in which $S$ is the Seebeck coefficient, $\sigma$ is the electrical conductivity and $\kappa$ is the thermal conductivity. In order to improve the thermoelectric performance of materials, the power factor ($S^2\sigma$) needs to be maximized and the thermal conductivity needs to be minimized.

The PbTe system can be optimized for power generation applications by improving the power factor via band engineering. It can be doped either n-type or p-type with appropriate dopants. Halogens are often used as n-type doping agents. PbCl_{2}, PbBr_{2} and PbI_{2} are commonly used to produce donor centers. Other n-type doping agents such as Bi_{2}Te_{3}, TaTe_{2}, MnTe_{2}, will substitute for Pb and create uncharged vacant Pb-sites. These vacant sites are subsequently filled by atoms from the lead excess and the valence electrons of these vacant atoms will diffuse through crystal. Common p-type doping agents are Na_{2}Te, K_{2}Te and Ag_{2}Te. They substitute for Te and create vacant uncharged Te sites. These sites are filled by Te atoms which are ionized to create additional positive holes. With band gap engineering, the maximum zT of PbTe has been reported to be 0.8 - 1.0 at ~650K.

Collaborations at Northwestern University boosted the zT of PbTe by significantly reducing its thermal conductivity using 'all-scale hierarchical architecturing'. With this approach, point defects, nanoscale precipitates and mesoscale grain boundaries are introduced as effective scattering centers for phonons with different mean free paths, without affecting charge carrier transport. By applying this method, the record value for zT of PbTe that has been achieved in Na doped PbTe-SrTe system is approximately 2.2.

In addition, PbTe is also often alloyed with tin to make lead tin telluride, which is used as an infrared detector material.

== See also ==
- Yellow Duckling, which used a lead telluride sensor to make the first infrared linescan camera
