= Germanium telluride =

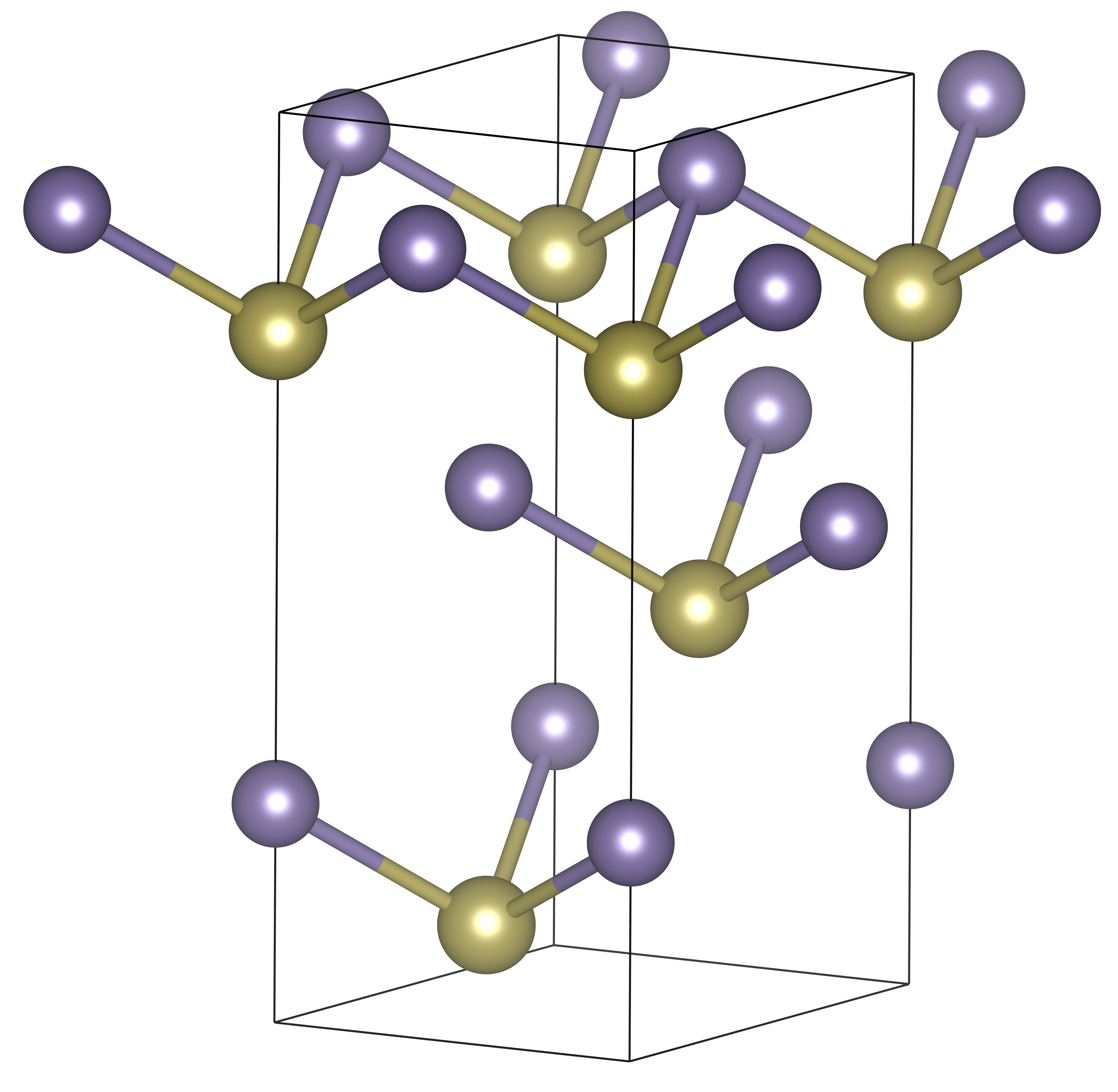
- Unit cell of germanium telluride.

Identifiers
CAS Number	12025-39-7
3D model (JSmol)	Interactive image
ChemSpider	74888
ECHA InfoCard	100.031.538
PubChem CID	16213264
CompTox Dashboard (EPA)	DTXSID401311129
- InChI: InChI=1S/GeTe2/c2-1-3 Key: GPMBECJIPQBCKI-UHFFFAOYSA-N; InChI=1/GeTe2/c2-1-3 Key: GPMBECJIPQBCKI-UHFFFAOYAU
- SMILES: [Ge]=[Te]

Properties
Chemical formula	GeTe
Molar mass	200.21 g/mol
Appearance	solid
Density	6.14 g/cm^{3}
Melting point	725 °C (1,337 °F; 998 K)
Band gap	0.6 eV
Refractive index (n_{D})	5

Structure
Crystal structure	Rhombohedral, hR6
Space group	R3m, No. 160
Lattice constant	a = 4.1719 Å, c = 10.710 Å
Lattice volume (V)	161.430 Å^{3}

Related compounds
Other anions	Germanium monoxide Germanium monosulfide Germanium monoselenide
- Except where otherwise noted, data are given for materials in their standard state (at 25 °C [77 °F], 100 kPa). verify (what is ?) Infobox references

Germanium telluride (GeTe) is a chemical compound of germanium and tellurium and is a component of chalcogenide glass. It shows semimetallic conduction and ferroelectric behaviour.

Germanium telluride exists in three major crystalline forms, room-temperature α (rhombohedral) and γ (orthorhombic) structures and high-temperature β (cubic, rocksalt-type) phase; α phase being most phase for pure GeTe below the ferroelectric Curie temperature of approximately 670 K (746 °F; 397 °C).

Doped germanium telluride is a low temperature superconductor.

== Phase Transition ==
Solid GeTe can transform between amorphous and crystalline states. The crystalline state has a low resistivity (semiconducting at room temperature) and the amorphous state has a high resistivity. The difference in resistivity can be up to six orders of magnitude depending on the film quality, GeTe compositions, and nucleation site formation. The drastic changes in the properties of the material have been exploited in data storage applications. The phase transitions of GeTe can be fast, reversible and repeatable, with drastic property changes, making GeTe a promising candidate in applications like radio frequency (RF) switching and direct current (DC) switching. Research on mechanisms that relate the phase transition and radio frequency (RF) switching is underway, with a promising future in optimization for telecommunication applications. Although both solid states can exist at room temperatures, the transition requires a specific heating and cooling process known as the thermal actuation method. To achieve the amorphous state the solid is heated up beyond the melting temperature with a high current pulse in a short amount of time and rapidly quenched or cooled down. Crystallization happens when the GeTe is heated to a crystallization temperature lower than the melting temperature with a relatively longer and lower current pulse, and a slow quenching process with the current gradually reduced. Both direct and indirect heating can induce phase changes. Joule heating approach is the common direct heating method and indirect heating can be accomplished by a separate layer of dielectric material added to the RF switch. The crystal structure of GeTe is rhombohedrally distorted rock salt-type structure that forms a face-centered cubic (FCC) sublattice at room temperature.

== Synthesis ==
=== Single-crystalline GeTe nanowires and nanohelices ===
Semiconducting GeTe nanowires (NW) and nanohelices (NH) are synthesized via vapor transport method, with metal nanoparticle catalysts. GeTe was evaporated and carried by Ar gas at optimum temperature, pressure, time, and gas flow rate to the downstream collecting/grow site (SiO_{2} surface coated with colloidal gold nanoparticles). High temperature over 500 °C produces thicker nanowires and crystalline chunks. Au is essential to the growth of NW and NH and is suggested to the metal catalyst of the reaction. This method gives rise to NW and NH with a 1:1 ratio of Ge and Te. NW produced by this method average about 65 nm in diameter and up to 50 μm in length. NHs averages to 135 nm in helix diameter.

=== Nanocrystal (quantum size effect) ===
The synthesis described above has not reached the sized required to exhibit quantum size effect. Nanostructures that reach the quantum regime exhibit a different set of phenomena unseen at a larger scale, for example, spontaneous polar ordering and the splitting of diffraction spots. The synthesis of GeTe nanocrystals of average size of 8, 17, and 100 nm involves divalent Ge(II) chloride – 1,4 dioxane complex and bis[bis(trimethylsilyl)amino]Ge (II) and trioctylphosphine-tellurium in a solvent such as 1,2-dichlorobenzene or phenyl ether. Ge(II) reduction kinetics has been thought to determine the GeTe formation. Large the Ge(II) reduction rate may lead to the increase in particle nucleation rate, resulting in the reduction of particle diameter.

== Applications ==
=== Memory storage ===
GeTe has been heavily used in non-volatile optical data storage such as CDs, DVDs, and Blu-ray and may replace dynamic and flash random access memories. In 1987, Yamada et al. explored the phase changing properties of GeTe and Sb_{2}Te_{3} for optical storage. The short crystallization time, cyclability and high optical contrast made these material better options than Te_{81}Ge_{15}Sb_{2}S_{2} which has a slow transition time.

=== RF switching ===
The high contrast in resistivity between the amorphous and crystalline states and the ability to reverse the transition repeatedly make GeTe a good candidate for RF switching. RF requires a thin layer of GeTe film to be deposited on the surface of the substrate. Seed layer structure, precursor composition, deposition temperature, pressure, gas flow rates, precursor bubbling temperatures and the substrates all play a role in the film properties.
