= Silicon monosulfide =

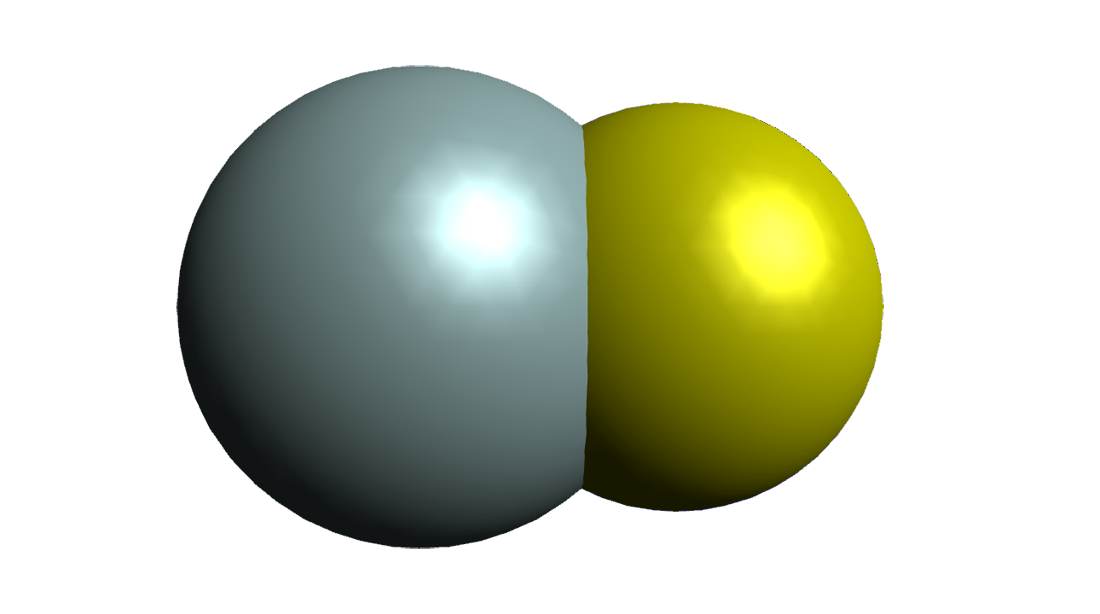

Names
- IUPAC name Silicon monosulfide

Identifiers
CAS Number	12504-41-5
3D model (JSmol)	Interactive image
PubChem CID	21538250
- InChI: InChI=1S/SSi/c1-2 Key: DWFFKGPZNGKUPH-UHFFFAOYSA-N
- SMILES: [Si]=S

Properties
Chemical formula	SiS
Molar mass	60.150 g/mol
- Except where otherwise noted, data are given for materials in their standard state (at 25 °C [77 °F], 100 kPa). Infobox references

Silicon monosulfide is a chemical compound of silicon and sulfur. The chemical formula is SiS. Molecular SiS has been detected at high temperature in the gas phase. The gas phase molecule has an Si-S bondlength of 192.93 pm, this compares to the normal single bond length of 216 pm, and is shorter than the Si=S bond length of around 201 pm reported in an organosilanethione. Historically a pale yellow-red amorphous solid compound has been reported. The behavior of silicon can be contrasted with germanium which forms a stable solid monosulfide.
