= Tin =

Tin, _{50}Sn
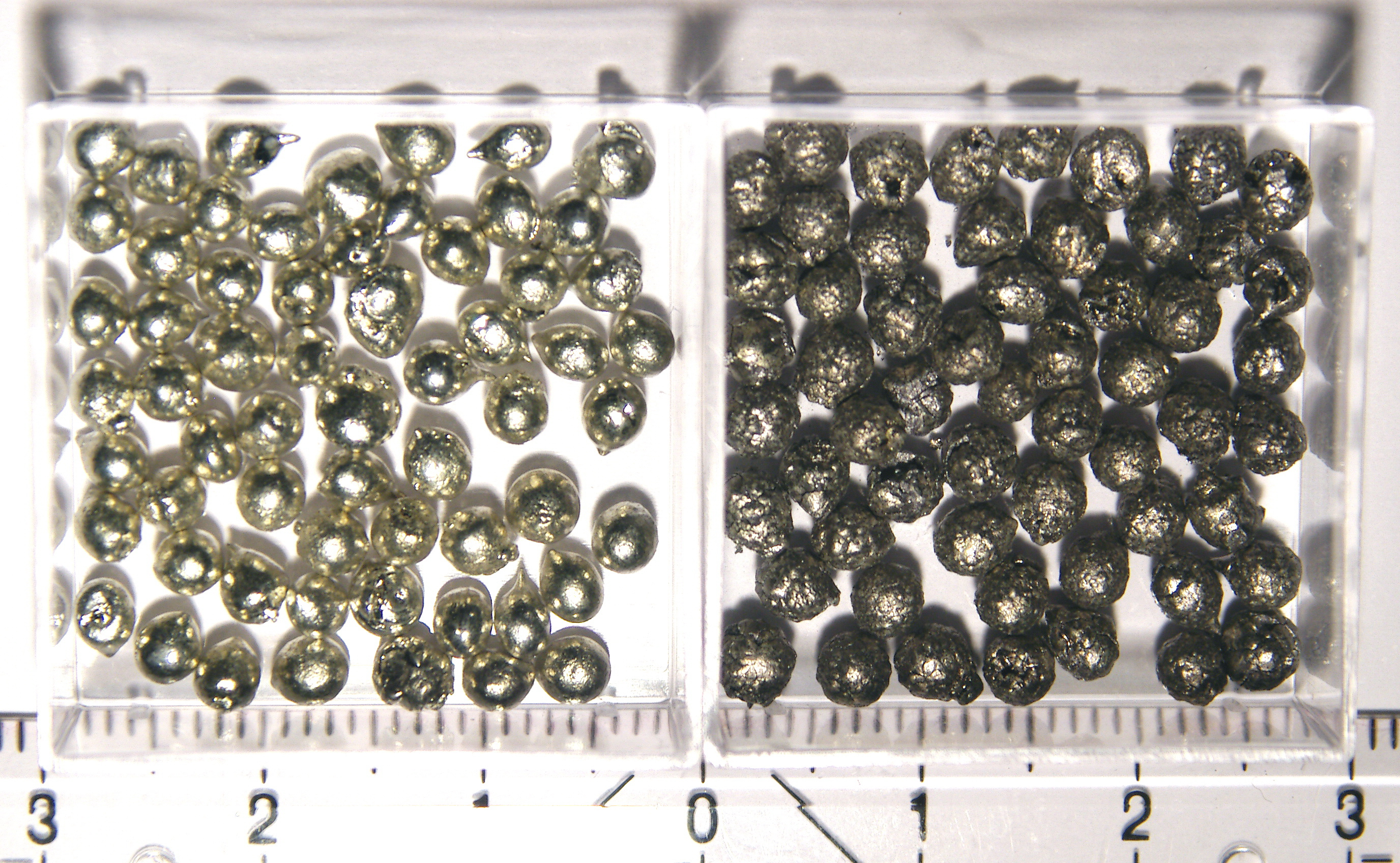
- Small balls of white tin (left) and gray tin (right)

Tin
- Alternative name: Stannum, pronounced: /ˈstænəm/ (STAN-əm)
- Allotropes: silvery-white, β (beta); gray, α (alpha)

Standard atomic weight A_{r}°(Sn)
- 118.710±0.007; 118.71±0.01 (abridged)

Tin in the periodic table
Hydrogen																															Helium
Lithium	Beryllium																									Boron	Carbon	Nitrogen	Oxygen	Fluorine	Neon
Sodium	Magnesium																									Aluminium	Silicon	Phosphorus	Sulfur	Chlorine	Argon
Potassium	Calcium															Scandium	Titanium	Vanadium	Chromium	Manganese	Iron	Cobalt	Nickel	Copper	Zinc	Gallium	Germanium	Arsenic	Selenium	Bromine	Krypton
Rubidium	Strontium															Yttrium	Zirconium	Niobium	Molybdenum	Technetium	Ruthenium	Rhodium	Palladium	Silver	Cadmium	Indium	Tin	Antimony	Tellurium	Iodine	Xenon
Caesium	Barium	Lanthanum	Cerium	Praseodymium	Neodymium	Promethium	Samarium	Europium	Gadolinium	Terbium	Dysprosium	Holmium	Erbium	Thulium	Ytterbium	Lutetium	Hafnium	Tantalum	Tungsten	Rhenium	Osmium	Iridium	Platinum	Gold	Mercury (element)	Thallium	Lead	Bismuth	Polonium	Astatine	Radon
Francium	Radium	Actinium	Thorium	Protactinium	Uranium	Neptunium	Plutonium	Americium	Curium	Berkelium	Californium	Einsteinium	Fermium	Mendelevium	Nobelium	Lawrencium	Rutherfordium	Dubnium	Seaborgium	Bohrium	Hassium	Meitnerium	Darmstadtium	Roentgenium	Copernicium	Nihonium	Flerovium	Moscovium	Livermorium	Tennessine	Oganesson
Ge
↑
Sn
↓
Pb
indium ← tin → antimony
- Atomic number (Z): 50
- Group: group 14 (carbon group)
- Period: period 5
- Block: p-block
- Electron configuration: [Kr] 4d^{10} 5s^{2} 5p^{2}
- Electrons per shell: 2, 8, 18, 18, 4

Physical properties
- Phase at STP: solid
- Melting point: 505.08 K (231.93 °C, 449.47 °F)
- Boiling point: 2875 K (2602 °C, 4716 °F)
- Density (at 20° C): white (β): 7.289 g/cm^{3} gray (α): 5.770 g/cm^{3}
- when liquid (at m.p.): 6.99 g/cm^{3}
- Heat of fusion: white (β): 7.03 kJ/mol
- Heat of vaporization: white (β): 296.1 kJ/mol
- Molar heat capacity: 27.112 J/(mol·K)
- Specific heat capacity: 228.389 J/(kg·K)
Vapor pressure
P (Pa)	1	10	100	1 k	10 k	100 k
at T (K)	1497	1657	1855	2107	2438	2893

Atomic properties
- Oxidation states: common: −4, +2, +4 −3, −2, −1, 0, +1, +3
- Electronegativity: Pauling scale: 1.96
- Ionization energies: 1st: 708.6 kJ/mol; 2nd: 1411.8 kJ/mol; 3rd: 2943.0 kJ/mol
- Atomic radius: empirical: 140 pm
- Covalent radius: 139±4 pm
- Van der Waals radius: 217 pm
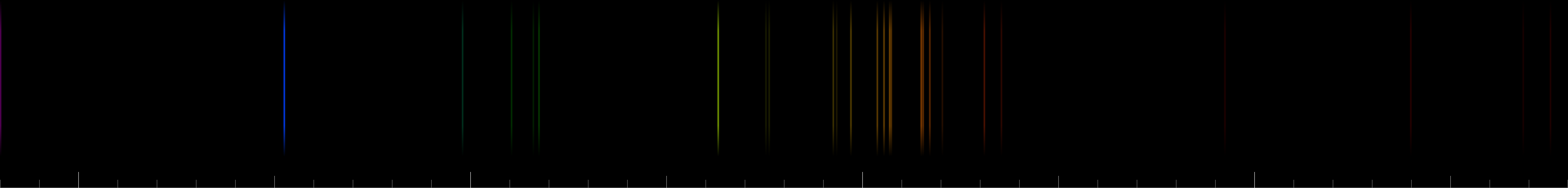
- Spectral lines of tin

Other properties
- Natural occurrence: primordial
- Crystal structure: white (β): body-centered tetragonal (tI4)
- Lattice constants: white (β): a = 583.13 pm c = 318.11 pm (at 20 °C)
- Crystal structure: gray (α): face-centered diamond-cubic (cF8)
- Lattice constant: gray (α): a = 648.96 pm (at 20 °C)
- Thermal expansion: white (β): 21.76×10^{−6}/K (at 20 °C) (Note: The thermal expansion of β-Sn is anisotropic: the parameters (at 20 °C) for each crystal axis are α_{a} = 16.19×10^{−6}/K, α_{c} = 32.89×10^{−6}/K, and α_{average} = α_{V}/3 = 21.76×10^{−6}/K.) gray (α): 5.20×10^{−6}/K (at 20 °C)
- Thermal conductivity: 66.8 W/(m⋅K)
- Electrical resistivity: 115 nΩ⋅m (at 0 °C)
- Magnetic ordering: white (β): paramagnetic gray (α): diamagnetic
- Molar magnetic susceptibility: white (β): +3.1×10^{−6} cm^{3}/mol (298 K)
- Young's modulus: 50 GPa
- Shear modulus: 18 GPa
- Bulk modulus: 58 GPa
- Speed of sound thin rod: 2730 m/s (at r.t.) (rolled)
- Poisson ratio: 0.36
- Mohs hardness: 1.5
- Brinell hardness: 50–440 MPa
- CAS Number: 7440-31-5

History
- Naming: a Proto-Germanic word
- Discovery: protohistoric, around 35th century BC
- Symbol: "Sn": from Latin stannum

Isotopes of tin
Main isotopes			Decay	
Isotope	abundance	half-life (t_{1/2})	mode	product
^{112}Sn	0.97%	stable		
^{113}Sn	synth	115.08 d	ε	^{113}In
^{114}Sn	0.66%	stable		
^{115}Sn	0.34%	stable		
^{116}Sn	14.5%	stable		
^{117}Sn	7.68%	stable		
^{118}Sn	24.2%	stable		
^{119}Sn	8.59%	stable		
^{120}Sn	32.6%	stable		
^{121m}Sn	synth	43.9 y	IT77.6%	^{121}Sn
^{121m}Sn	synth	43.9 y	β^{−}22.4%	^{121}Sb
^{122}Sn	4.63%	stable		
^{123}Sn	synth	129.2 d	β^{−}	^{123}Sb
^{124}Sn	5.79%	stable		
^{126}Sn	trace	2.3×10^{5} y	β^{−}	^{126}Sb

Tin is a chemical element; it has the symbol Sn (from Latin stannum) and atomic number 50. A metallic-gray metal, tin is soft enough to be cut with little force, and a bar of tin can be bent by hand with little effort. When bent, a bar of tin makes a sound, the so-called "tin cry", as a result of twinning in tin crystals.

Tin is a post-transition metal in group 14 of the periodic table of elements. It is obtained chiefly from the mineral cassiterite, which contains stannic oxide, SnO_{2}. Tin shows a chemical similarity to both of its neighbors in group 14, germanium and lead, and has two main oxidation states, +2 and the slightly more stable +4. Tin is the 49th most abundant element on Earth, making up 0.00022% of its crust, and with 10 stable isotopes, it has the largest number of stable isotopes in the periodic table, due to its magic number of protons.

It has two main allotropes: at room temperature, the stable allotrope is β-tin, a silvery-white, malleable metal; at low temperatures it is less dense grey α-tin, which has the diamond cubic structure. Metallic tin does not easily oxidize in air or water.

The first tin alloy used on a large scale was bronze, made of 1/8 tin and 7/8 copper (12.5% and 87.5% respectively), from as early as 3000 BC. After 600 BC, pure metallic tin was produced. Pewter, which is an alloy of 85–90% tin with the remainder commonly consisting of copper, antimony, bismuth, and sometimes lead and silver, has been used for flatware since the Bronze Age. In modern times, tin is used in many alloys, most notably tin-lead soft solders, which are typically 60% or more tin, and in the manufacture of transparent, electrically conducting films of indium tin oxide in optoelectronic applications. Another large application is corrosion-resistant tin plating of steel. Because of the low toxicity of inorganic tin, tin-plated steel is widely used for food packaging as "tin cans". Some organotin compounds can be extremely toxic.

== Characteristics ==
=== Physical ===
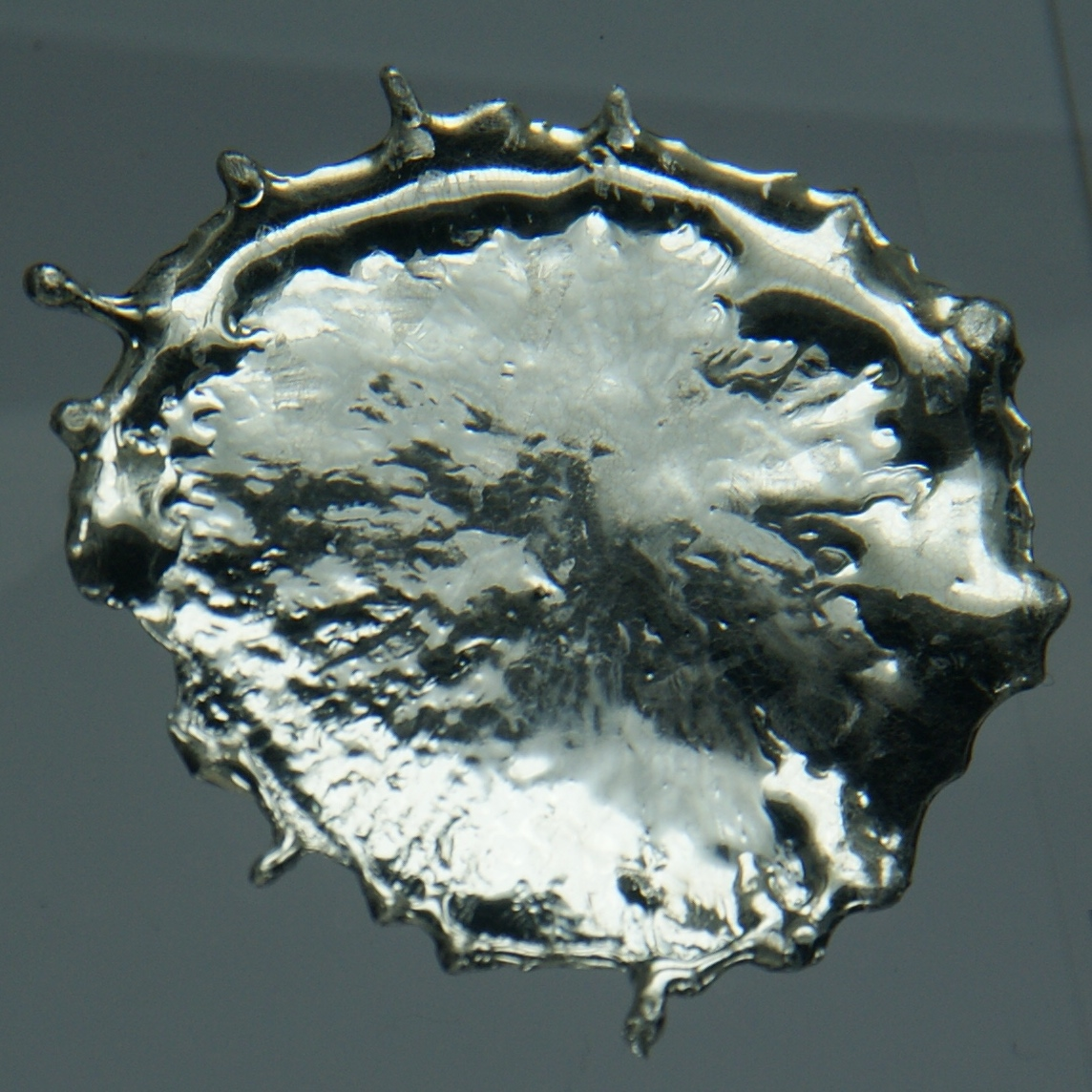
Solidified droplet of molten tin

Tin is a soft, malleable, ductile and highly crystalline silvery-white metal. When a bar of tin is bent, a crackling sound known as the "tin cry" can be heard from the twinning of the crystals. This trait is shared by indium, cadmium, zinc, and mercury in its solid state. Tin melts at about 232 °C (450 °F), the lowest in group 14, and boils at 2,602 °C (4,716 °F), the second lowest (ahead of lead) in its group. The melting point is further lowered to 177.3 °C (351.1 °F) for 11 nm particles.

External videos
- β–α transition of tin at −40 °C (time lapse; one second of the video is one hour in real time)

β-tin, also called white tin, is the allotrope (structural form) of elemental tin that is stable at and above room temperature. It is metallic and malleable, and has body-centered tetragonal crystal structure. α-tin, or gray tin, is the nonmetallic form. It is stable below 13.2 °C (55.8 °F) and is brittle. α-tin has a diamond cubic crystal structure, as do diamond and silicon. α-tin does not have metallic properties because its atoms form a covalent structure in which electrons cannot move freely. α-tin is a dull-gray powdery material with no common uses other than specialized semiconductor applications. γ-tin and σ-tin exist at temperatures above 161 °C (322 °F) and pressures above several GPa.

In cold conditions β-tin tends to transform spontaneously into α-tin, a phenomenon known as "tin pest" or "tin disease". Some unverifiable sources also say that, during Napoleon's Russian campaign of 1812, the temperatures became so cold that the tin buttons on the soldiers' uniforms disintegrated over time, contributing to the defeat of the Grande Armée, a persistent legend.

The α-β transformation temperature is 13.2 °C (55.8 °F), but impurities (e.g. Al, Zn, etc.) lower it well below 0 °C (32 °F). With the addition of antimony or bismuth the transformation might not occur at all, increasing durability. Commercial grades of tin (99.8% tin content) resist transformation because of the inhibiting effect of small amounts of bismuth, antimony, lead, and silver present as impurities.

Alloying elements such as copper, antimony, bismuth, cadmium, and silver increase the hardness of tin. Tin easily forms hard, brittle intermetallic phases that are typically undesirable. It does not mix into a solution with most metals and elements so tin does not have much solid solubility. Tin mixes well with bismuth, gallium, lead, thallium and zinc, forming simple eutectic systems.

Tin becomes a superconductor below 3.72 K and was one of the first superconductors to be studied. The Meissner effect, one of the characteristic features of superconductors, was first discovered in superconducting tin crystals.

=== Chemical ===
Tin resists corrosion from water, but can be corroded by acids and alkalis. Tin can be highly polished and is used as a protective coat for other metals. When heated in air it oxidizes slowly to form a thin passivation layer of stannic oxide (SnO_{2}) that inhibits further oxidation.

=== Isotopes ===
Tin has seven to ten stable isotopes, the greatest number of any element. Their mass numbers are 112, 114, 115, 116, 117, 118, 119, 120, 122, and 124. Seven, ^{114-120}Sn, are theoretically stable, while the remaining three, ^{112}Sn, ^{122}Sn, and ^{124}Sn, are potentially radioactive to double beta decay, but have not been observed to decay. Tin-120 makes up almost a third of all tin. Tin-118 and tin-116 are also common. Tin-115 is the least common stable isotope. The isotopes with even mass numbers have no nuclear spin, while those with odd mass numbers have a nuclear spin of 1/2. It is thought that tin has such a great multitude of stable isotopes because of tin's atomic number being 50, which is a "magic number" in nuclear physics.

Tin is one of the easiest elements to detect and analyze by NMR spectroscopy, which relies on molecular weight and its chemical shifts are referenced against tetramethyltin (SnMe_{4}). (Note: Only hydrogen, fluorine, phosphorus, thallium and xenon are easier to use NMR analysis with for samples containing isotopes at their natural abundance.)

Of the stable isotopes, tin-115 has a high neutron capture cross section for thermal neutrons, at 30 barns. Tin-117 has a cross section of 2.3 barns, one order of magnitude smaller, while tin-119 has a slightly smaller cross section of 2.2 barns. Before these cross sections were well known, it was proposed to use tin-lead solder as a coolant for fast reactors because of its low melting point. Current studies are for lead or lead-bismuth reactor coolants because both heavy metals are nearly transparent to fast neutrons, with very low capture cross sections. In order to use a tin or tin-lead coolant, the tin would first have to go through isotopic separation to remove the isotopes with odd mass number. Combined, these three isotopes make up about 17% of natural tin but represent nearly all of the capture cross section. Of the remaining seven isotopes tin-112 has a capture cross section of 1 barn. The other six isotopes forming 82.7% of natural tin have capture cross sections of 0.3 barns or less, making them effectively transparent to neutrons.

Tin has 33 unstable isotopes, ranging in mass number from 98 to 140. The unstable tin isotopes have half-lives of less than a year except for tin-126, which has a half-life of about 230,000 years. Tin-100 and tin-132 are two of the very few nuclides with a "doubly magic" nucleus; though they are unstable, being far off the valley of stability in neutron–proton ratio, the tin isotopes lighter than tin-100 and heavier than tin-132 are even less stable. Another 55 metastable isomers have been identified for tin isotopes between 111 and 131, the most stable being tin-121m, with a half-life of 43.9 years.

== Etymology ==
The word tin is shared among Germanic languages and can be traced back to reconstructed Proto-Germanic *tin-om; cognates include German Zinn, Swedish tenn and Dutch tin. It is not found in other branches of Indo-European, except by borrowing from Germanic (e.g., Irish tinne from English).

The Latin name for tin, stannum or stagnum, originally meant an alloy of silver and lead, and came to mean 'tin' in the fourth century—the earlier Latin word for it was plumbum candidum, or "white lead". Stannum apparently came from an earlier stāgnum (meaning the same substance), the origin of the Romance and Celtic terms for tin, such as French étain, Spanish estaño, Italian stagno, and Irish stán. The origin of stannum/stāgnum is unknown; it may be pre-Indo-European.

The Meyers Konversations-Lexikon suggests instead that stannum came from Cornish stean, and is evidence that Cornwall in the first centuries AD was the main source of tin.

The ancient Greek word was κασσίτερος (kassíteros). Beekes suggests the name could be a demonym for the bronze age Kassite people (Neo-Assyrian 𒂵𒅆𒄿; ka₃-ši-i, kašši) of the Ancient Near East.

== History ==
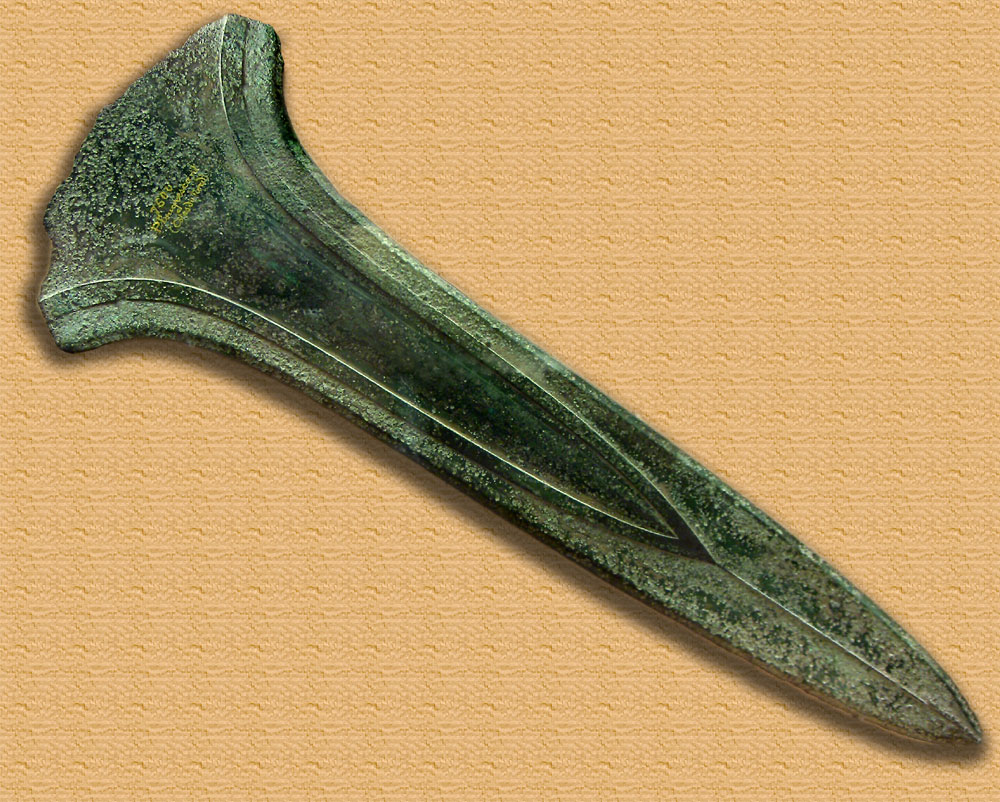
Ceremonial giant bronze dirk of the Plougrescant-Ommerschans type, Plougrescant, France, 1500–1300 BC

Tin extraction and use can be dated to the beginnings of the Bronze Age around 3000 BC, when it was observed that copper objects formed of polymetallic ores with different metal contents had different physical properties. The earliest bronze objects had a tin or arsenic content of less than 2% and are believed to be the result of unintentional alloying due to trace metal content in the copper ore. The addition of a second metal to copper increases its hardness, lowers the melting temperature, and improves the casting process by producing a more fluid melt that cools to a denser, less spongy metal. This was an important innovation that allowed for the much more complex shapes cast in closed molds of the Bronze Age. Arsenical bronze objects appear first in the Near East where arsenic is commonly found with copper ore, but the health risks were quickly realized and the quest for sources of the much less hazardous tin ores began early in the Bronze Age. This created the demand for rare tin metal and formed a trade network that linked the distant sources of tin to the markets of Bronze Age cultures.

Cassiterite (SnO_{2}), the oxide form of tin, was most likely the original source of tin. Other tin ores are less common sulfides such as stannite that require a more involved smelting process. Cassiterite often accumulates in alluvial channels as placer deposits because it is harder, heavier, and more chemically resistant than the accompanying granite. Cassiterite is usually black or dark in color, and these deposits can be easily seen in river banks. Alluvial (placer) deposits may incidentally have been collected and separated by methods similar to gold panning.

Tin replaced silver as the main export commodity of Bolivia in the early 20th century as it was used in solder as the canning industry greatly expanded. Starting in the late 1920s tin prices began a long trend of gradual decline. During the Second World War Bolivian tin mining magnate Simón Iturri Patiño was believed to be one of the five wealthiest men in the world.

Later, in 1985 the crash of international tin prices led to the 1985 Bolivian economic crisis. Bolivian company Corporación Minera de Bolivia (COMIBOL) was forced to lay off over 20,000 miners.

== Compounds and chemistry ==
In the great majority of its compounds, tin has the oxidation state II or IV. Compounds containing bivalent tin are called stannous while those containing tetravalent tin are termed stannic.

=== Inorganic compounds ===
Halide compounds are known for both oxidation states. For Sn(IV), all four halides are well known: SnF_{4}, SnCl_{4}, SnBr_{4}, and SnI_{4}. The three heavier members are volatile molecular compounds, whereas the tetrafluoride is polymeric. All four halides are known for Sn(II) also: SnF_{2}, SnCl_{2}, SnBr_{2}, and SnI_{2}. All are polymeric solids. Of these eight compounds, only the iodides are colored.

Tin(II) chloride (also known as stannous chloride) is the most important commercial tin halide. Illustrating the routes to such compounds, chlorine reacts with tin metal to give SnCl_{4} whereas the reaction of hydrochloric acid and tin produces SnCl_{2} and hydrogen gas. Alternatively SnCl_{4} and Sn combine to stannous chloride by a process called comproportionation:

SnCl_{4} + Sn → 2 SnCl_{2}

Tin can form many oxides, sulfides, and other chalcogenide derivatives. The dioxide SnO_{2} (cassiterite) forms when tin is heated in the presence of air. SnO_{2} is amphoteric, which means that it dissolves in both acidic and basic solutions. Stannates with the structure [Sn(OH)_{6}]^{2−}, like K_{2}Sn(OH)_{6}, are also known, though the free stannic acid H_{2}Sn(OH)_{6} is unknown.

Sulfides of tin exist in both the +2 and +4 oxidation states: tin(II) sulfide and tin(IV) sulfide (mosaic gold).

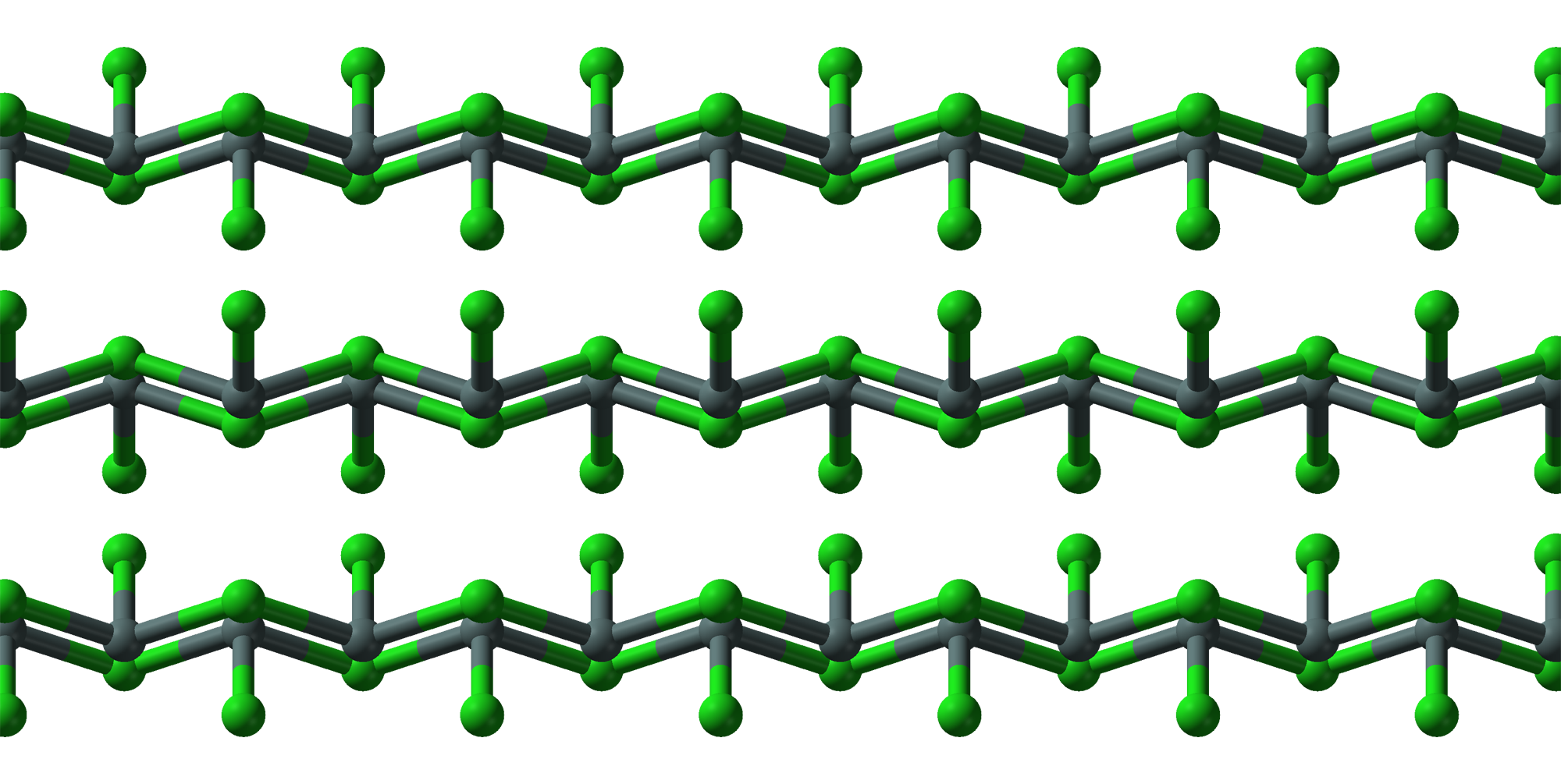
Ball-and-stick models of the structure of solid stannous chloride (SnCl_{2})

=== Hydrides ===
Stannane (SnH_{4}), with tin in the +4 oxidation state, is unstable. Organotin hydrides are however well known, e.g. tributyltin hydride (Sn(C_{4}H_{9})_{3}H). These compounds release transient tributyl tin radicals, which are rare examples of compounds of tin(III).

=== Organotin compounds ===
Organotin compounds, sometimes called stannanes, are chemical compounds with tin–carbon bonds. Of the tin compounds, the organic derivatives are commercially the most useful. Some organotin compounds are highly toxic and have been used as biocides. The first organotin compound to be reported was diethyltin diiodide ((C_{2}H_{5})_{2}SnI_{2}), reported by Edward Frankland in 1849.

Most organotin compounds are colorless liquids or solids that are stable to air and water. They adopt tetrahedral geometry. Tetraalkyl- and tetraaryltin compounds can be prepared using Grignard reagents:

SnCl_{4} + 4 RMgBr → R_{4}Sn + 4 MgBrCl

The mixed halide-alkyls, which are more common and more important commercially than the tetraorgano derivatives, are prepared by redistribution reactions:

SnCl_{4} + R_{4}Sn → 2 SnCl_{2}R_{2}

Divalent organotin compounds are uncommon, although more common than related divalent organogermanium and organosilicon compounds. The greater stabilization enjoyed by Sn(II) is attributed to the "inert pair effect". Organotin(II) compounds include both stannylenes (formula: R_{2}Sn, as seen for singlet carbenes) and distannylenes (R_{4}Sn_{2}), which are roughly equivalent to alkenes. Both classes exhibit unusual reactions.

== Occurrence ==
Tin production

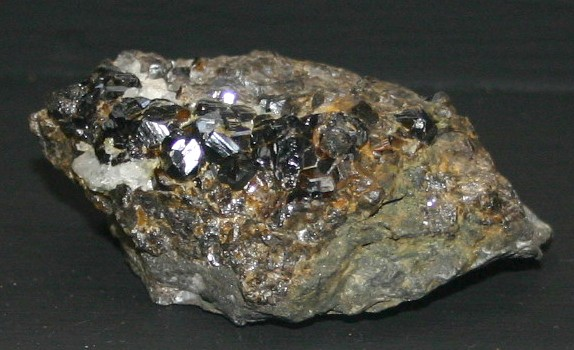
Sample of cassiterite, the main ore of tin

Tin is generated via the long s-process in low-to-medium mass stars (with masses of 0.6 to 10 times that of the Sun), and finally by beta decay of the heavy isotopes of indium.

Tin is the 49th most abundant element in Earth's crust, representing 2 ppm compared with 75 ppm for zinc, 50 ppm for copper, and 14 ppm for lead.

Tin does not occur as the native element but must be extracted from various ores. Cassiterite (SnO_{2}) is the only commercially important source of tin, although small quantities of tin are recovered from complex sulfides such as stannite, cylindrite, franckeite, canfieldite, and teallite. Minerals with tin are almost always associated with granite rock, usually at a level of 1% tin oxide content.

Because of the higher specific gravity of tin dioxide, about 80% of mined tin is from secondary deposits found downstream from the primary lodes. Tin is often recovered from granules washed downstream in the past and deposited in valleys or the sea. The most economical ways of mining tin are by dredging, hydraulicking, or open pits. Most of the world's tin is produced from placer deposits, which can contain as little as 0.015% tin.

World tin mine reserves (tonnes, 2011)
Country	Reserves
China	1,500,000
Malaysia	250,000
Peru	310,000
Indonesia	800,000
Brazil	590,000
Bolivia	400,000
Russia	350,000
Australia	180,000
Thailand	170,000
Other	180,000
Total	4,800,000

Economically recoverable tin reserves
Year	Million tonnes
1965	4,265
1970	3,930
1975	9,060
1980	9,100
1985	3,060
1990	7,100
1995	7,000 (approx.)
2000	7,100
2010	5,200
2015	2,200 (approx.)
2020	4,700 (approx.)
2025	6,000 (approx.)

About 253,000 tonnes of tin were mined in 2011, mostly in China (110,000 t), Indonesia (51,000 t), Peru (34,600 t), Bolivia (20,700 t) and Brazil (12,000 t). Estimates of tin production have historically varied with the market and mining technology. It is estimated that, at current consumption rates and technologies, the Earth will run out of mineable tin in 40 years. In 2006 Lester Brown suggested tin could run out within 20 years based on conservative estimates of 2% annual growth.

Scrap tin is an important source of the metal. Recovery of tin through recycling is increasing rapidly as of 2019. Whereas the United States has neither mined (since 1993) nor smelted (since 1989) tin, it was the largest secondary producer, recycling nearly 14,000 tonnes in 2006.

New deposits are reported in Mongolia, and in 2009, new deposits of tin were discovered in Colombia.

== Production ==
Largest tin producing companies (tonnes)
Company	Polity	2006	2007	2017	2006–2017 % change
Yunnan Tin	China	52,339	61,129	74,500	42.3
PT Timah	Indonesia	44,689	58,325	30,200	−32.4
Malaysia Smelting Corp	Malaysia	22,850	25,471	27,200	19.0
Yunnan Chengfeng	China	21,765	18,000	26,800	23.1
Minsur	Peru	40,977	35,940	18,000	−56.1
EM Vinto	Bolivia	11,804	9,448	12,600	6.7
Guangxi China Tin	China	/	/	11,500	/
Thaisarco	Thailand	27,828	19,826	10,600	−61.9
Metallo-Chimique	Belgium	8,049	8,372	9,700	20.5
Gejiu Zi Li	China	/	/	8,700	/

Tin is produced by carbothermic reduction of the oxide ore with carbon or coke. Both reverberatory furnace and electric furnace can be used:

SnO_{2} + C Sn + CO_{2}↑

=== Industry ===
Most of the world's tin is traded on LME, from 8 countries, under 17 brands.

The International Tin Council was established in 1947 to control the price of tin. It collapsed in 1985. In 1984, the Association of Tin Producing Countries was created, with Australia, Bolivia, Indonesia, Malaysia, Nigeria, Thailand, and Zaire as members.

== Price and exchanges ==
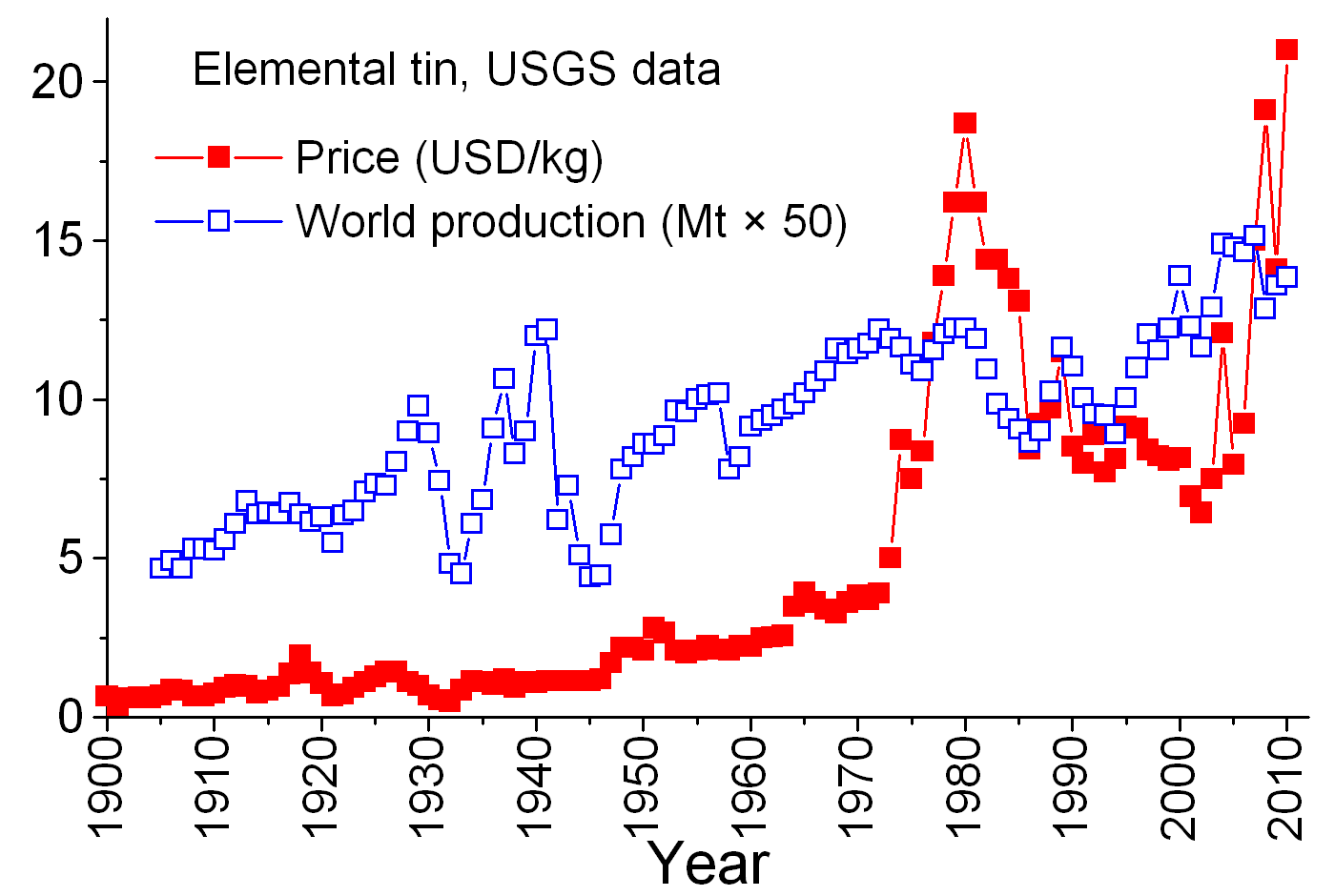
World production and price (US exchange) of tin

Tin is unique among mineral commodities because of the complex agreements between producer countries and consumer countries dating back to 1921. Earlier agreements tended to be somewhat informal and led to the "First International Tin Agreement" in 1956, the first of a series that effectively collapsed in 1985. Through these agreements, the International Tin Council (ITC) had a considerable effect on tin prices. ITC supported the price of tin during periods of low prices by buying tin for its buffer stockpile and was able to restrain the price during periods of high prices by selling from the stockpile. This was an anti-free-market approach, designed to assure a sufficient flow of tin to consumer countries and a profit for producer countries. However, the buffer stockpile was not sufficiently large, and during most of those 29 years tin prices rose, sometimes sharply, especially from 1973 through 1980 when rampant inflation plagued many world economies.

During the late 1970s and early 1980s, the U.S. reduced its strategic tin stockpile, partly to take advantage of historically high tin prices. The 1981–82 recession damaged the tin industry. Tin consumption declined dramatically. ITC was able to avoid truly steep declines through accelerated buying for its buffer stockpile; this activity required extensive borrowing. ITC continued to borrow until late 1985 when it reached its credit limit. Immediately, a major "tin crisis" ensued—tin was delisted from trading on the London Metal Exchange for about three years. ITC dissolved soon afterward, and the price of tin, now in a free-market environment, fell to $4 per pound and remained around that level through the 1990s. The price increased again by 2010 with a rebound in consumption following the 2008 financial crisis and the Great Recession, accompanying restocking and continued growth in consumption.

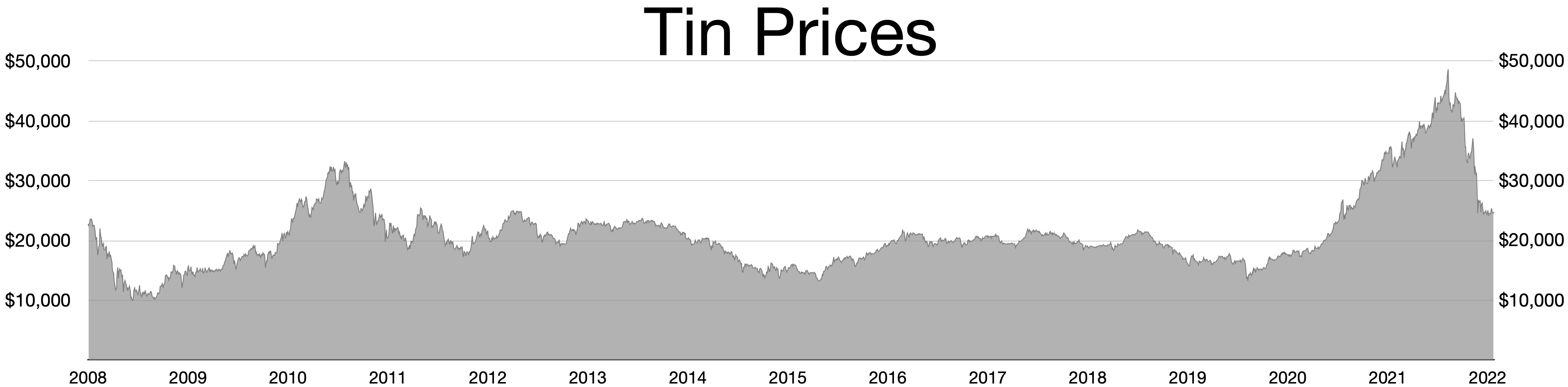
Tin prices from 2008 to 2022

London Metal Exchange (LME) is tin's principal trading site. Other tin contract markets are Kuala Lumpur Tin Market (KLTM) and Indonesia Tin Exchange (INATIN).

Due to factors involved in the 2021 global supply chain crisis, tin prices almost doubled during 2020–21 and have had their largest annual rise in over 30 years. Global refined tin consumption dropped 1.6 percent in 2020 as the COVID-19 pandemic disrupted global manufacturing industries.

== Applications ==
World consumption of refined tin by end-use, 2006

In 2018, just under half of all tin produced was used in solder. The rest was divided between tin plating, tin chemicals, brass and bronze alloys, and niche uses.

=== Pigments ===
Pigment Yellow 38, tin(IV) sulfide, is known as mosaic gold.

Purple of Cassius, Pigment Red 109, a hydrous double stannate of gold, was mainly, in terms of painting, restricted to miniatures due to its high cost. It was widely used to make cranberry glass. It has also been used in the arts to stain porcelain.

Lead-tin yellow (which occurs in two yellow forms — a stannate and a silicate) was a pigment that was historically highly important for oil painting and which had some use in fresco in its silicate form. Lead stannate is also known in orange form but has not seen wide use in the fine arts. It is available for purchase in pigment form from specialist artists' suppliers. There is another minor form, in terms of artistic usage and availability, of lead-tin yellow known as Lead-tin Antimony Yellow also known as Naples Yellow.

Cerulean blue, a somewhat dull cyan chemically known as cobalt stannate, continues to be an important artists' pigment. Its hue is similar to that of Manganese blue, Pigment Blue 33, although it lacks that pigment's colorfulness and is more opaque. Artists typically must choose between cobalt stannate and manganese blue imitations made with phthalocyanine blue green shade (Pigment Blue 15:3), as industrial production of manganese blue pigment ceased in the 1970s. Cerulean blue made with cobalt stannate, however, was popular with artists prior to the production of Manganese blue.

Pigment Red 233, commonly known as Pinkcolor or Potter's Pink and more precisely known as Chrome Tin Pink Sphene, is a historically important pigment in watercolor. However, it has enjoyed a large resurgence in popularity due to Internet-based word-of-mouth. It is fully lightfast and chemically stable in both oil paints and watercolors. Other inorganic mixed metal complex pigments, produced via calcination, often feature tin as a constituent. These pigments are known for their lightfastness, weatherfastness, chemical stability, lack of toxicity, and opacity. Many are rather dull in terms of colorfulness. However, some possess enough colorfulness to be competitive for use cases that require more than a moderate amount of it. Some are prized for other qualities. For instance, Pinkcolor is chosen by many watercolorists for its strong granulation, even though its chroma is low. Recently, NTP Yellow (a pyrochlore) has been brought to market as a non-toxic replacement for lead(II) chromate with greater opacity, lightfastness, and weathering resistance than proposed organic lead chromate replacement pigments possess. NTP Yellow possesses the highest level of color saturation of these contemporary inorganic mixed metal complex pigments. More examples of this group include Pigment Yellow 158 (Tin Vanadium Yellow Cassiterite), Pigment Yellow 216 (Solaplex Yellow), Pigment Yellow 219 (Titanium Zinc Antimony Stannate), Pigment Orange 82 (Tin Titanium Zinc oxide, also known as Sicopal Orange), Pigment Red 121 (also known as Tin Violet and Chromium stannate), Pigment Red 230 (Chrome Alumina Pink Corundum), Pigment Red 236 (Chrome Tin Orchid Cassiterite), and Pigment Black 23 (Tin Antimony Grey Cassiterite). Another blue pigment with tin and cobalt is Pigment Blue 81, Cobalt Tin Alumina Blue Spinel.

Pigment White 15, tin(IV) oxide, is used for its iridescence, most commonly as a ceramic glaze. There are no green pigments that have been used by artists that have tin as a constituent and purplish pigments with tin are classified as red, according to the Colour Index International.

=== Solder ===
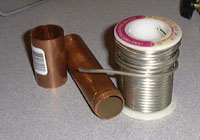
A coil of lead-free solder wire

Tin has long been used in alloys with lead as solder, in amounts of 5 to 70% w/w. Tin with lead forms a eutectic mixture at the weight proportion of 61.9% tin and 38.1% lead (the atomic proportion: 73.9% tin and 26.1% lead), with melting temperature of 183 °C (361.4 °F). Such solders are primarily used for joining pipes or electric circuits. Since the European Union Waste Electrical and Electronic Equipment Directive (WEEE Directive) and Restriction of Hazardous Substances Directive came into effect on 1 July 2006, the lead content in such alloys has decreased. While lead exposure is associated with serious health problems, lead-free solder is not without its challenges, including a higher melting point, and the formation of tin whiskers that cause electrical problems. Tin pest can occur in lead-free solders, leading to loss of the soldered joint. Replacement alloys are being found, but the problems of joint integrity remain. A common lead-free alloy is 99% tin, 0.7% copper, and 0.3% silver, with melting temperature of 217 °C (422.6 °F).

=== Tin plating ===
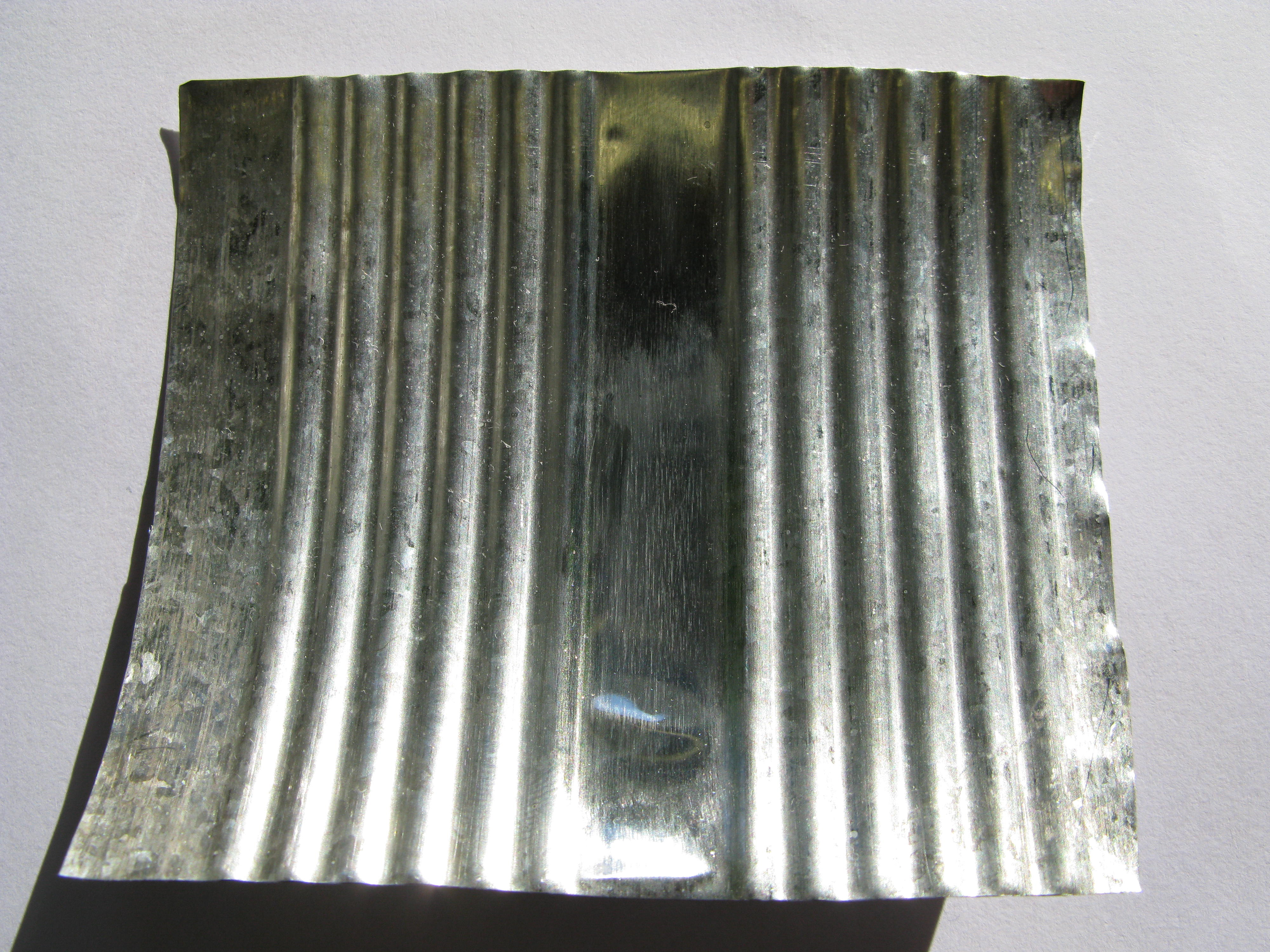
Tin plated metal from a can

Tin bonds readily to iron and is used for coating lead, zinc, and steel to prevent corrosion. Tin-plated (or tinned) steel containers are widely used for food preservation, and this forms a large part of the market for metallic tin. A tinplate canister for preserving food was first manufactured in London in 1812. Speakers of British English call such containers "tins", while speakers of U.S. English call them "cans" or "tin cans". One derivation of such use is the slang term "tinnie" or "tinny", meaning "can of beer" in Australia. The tin whistle is so called because it was mass-produced first in tin-plated steel.

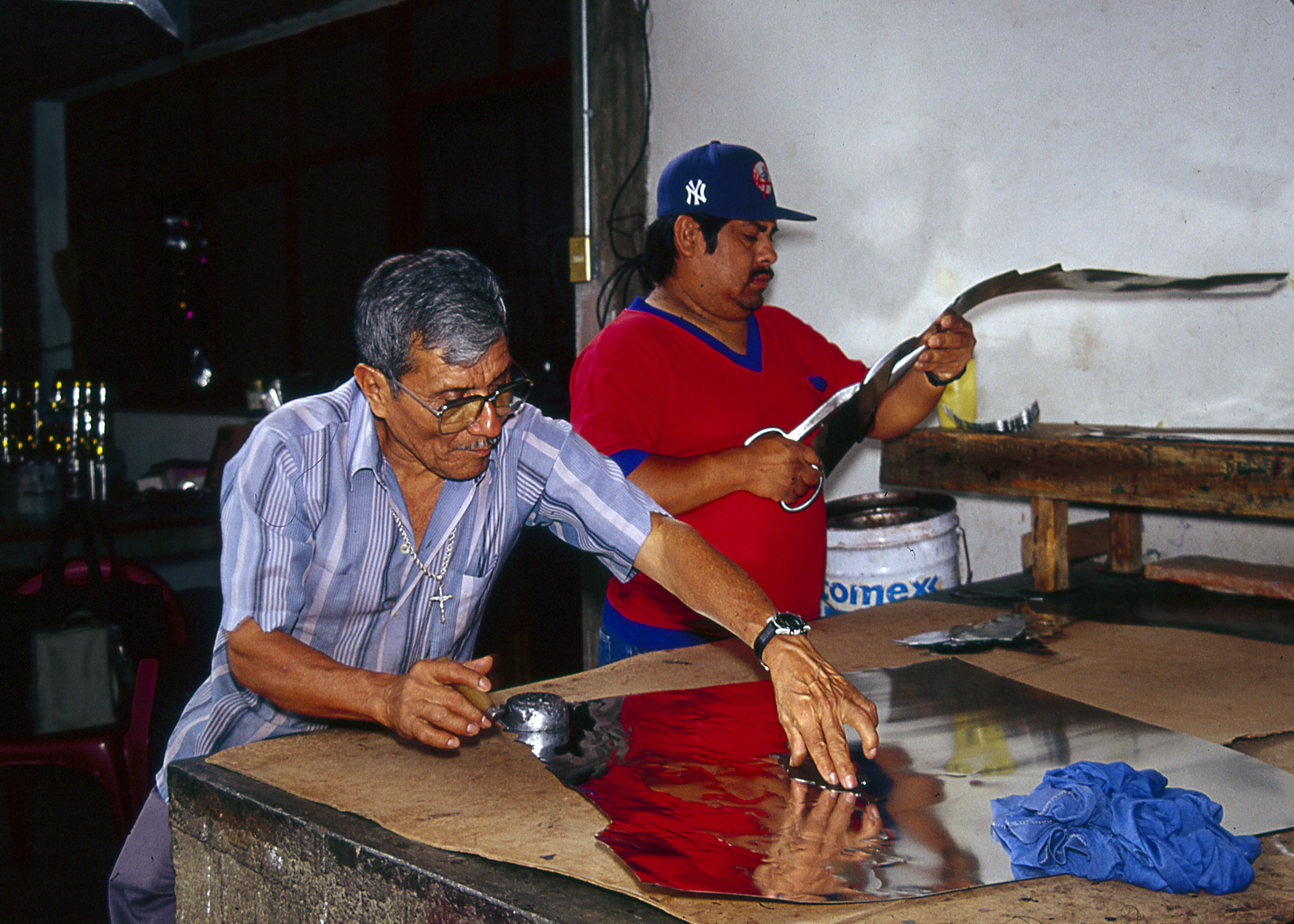
Artisans working with tin sheets

Copper cooking vessels such as saucepans and frying pans are frequently lined with a thin plating of tin, by electroplating or by traditional chemical methods, since use of copper cookware with acidic foods can be toxic. Tin foil, a thin foil made of tin, has been made since the Eastern Zhou period of China and is variously used to decorate and wrap objects. The term is sometimes used to describe the cheaper, more durable aluminium foil that largely supplanted its use by the 20th century.

=== Specialized alloys ===
Tin in combination with other elements forms a wide variety of useful alloys. Tin is most commonly alloyed with copper. Pewter is 85–99% tin, and bearing metal has a high percentage of tin as well. Bronze is mostly copper with 12% tin, while the addition of phosphorus yields phosphor bronze. Bell metal is also a copper–tin alloy, containing 22% tin. Tin has sometimes been used in coinage; it once formed a single-digit percentage (usually five percent or less) of American and Canadian pennies.

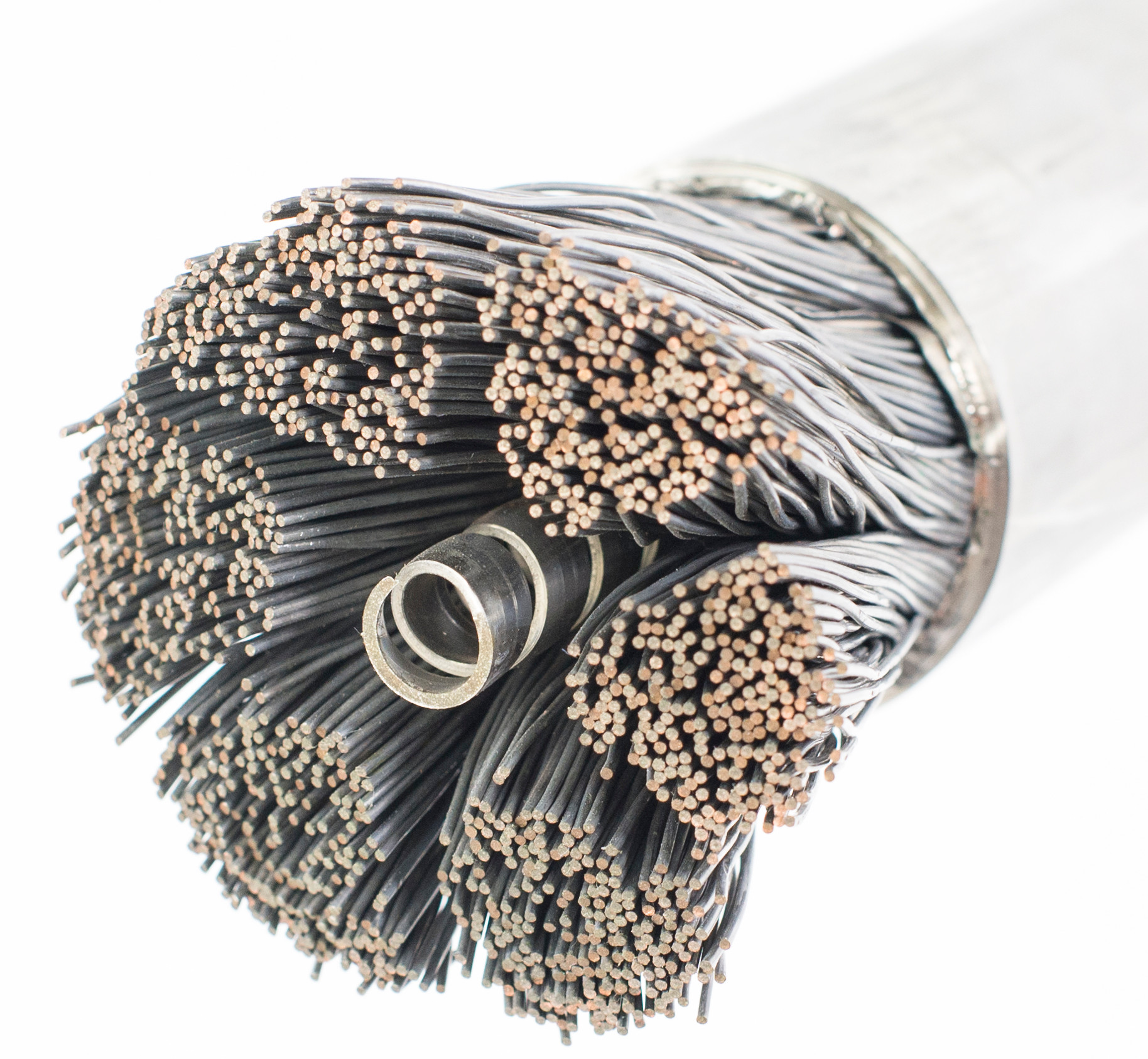
Niobium–tin wire from the ITER fusion reactor, which is currently under construction.

The niobium–tin compound Nb_{3}Sn is commercially used in coils of superconducting magnets for its high critical temperature (18 K) and critical magnetic field (25 T). A superconducting magnet weighing as little as two kilograms is capable of producing the magnetic field of a conventional electromagnet weighing tons.

A small percentage of tin is added to zirconium alloys for the cladding of nuclear fuel.

Most metal pipes in a pipe organ are of a tin/lead alloy, with 50/50 as the most common composition. The proportion of tin in the pipe defines the pipe's tone, since tin has a desirable tonal resonance. When a tin/lead alloy cools, the lead phase solidifies first, then when the eutectic temperature is reached, the remaining liquid forms the layered tin/lead eutectic structure, which is shiny; contrast with the lead phase produces a mottled or spotted effect. This metal alloy is referred to as spotted metal. Major advantages of using tin for pipes include its appearance, workability, and resistance to corrosion.

=== Manufacturing of chemicals ===
Tin compounds are used in the production of various chemicals, including stabilizers for PVC and catalysts for industrial processes. Ingots of tin provide the raw material necessary for these chemical reactions, ensuring consistent quality and performance.

=== Optoelectronics ===
The oxides of indium and tin are electrically conductive and transparent, and are used to make transparent electrically conducting films with applications in optoelectronics devices such as liquid crystal displays.

=== Other applications ===
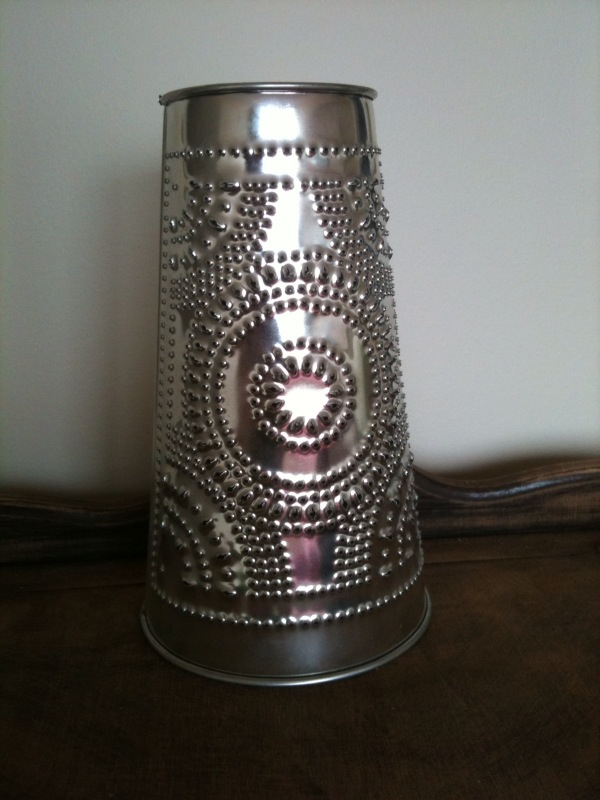
A 21st-century reproduction barn lantern made of punched tin

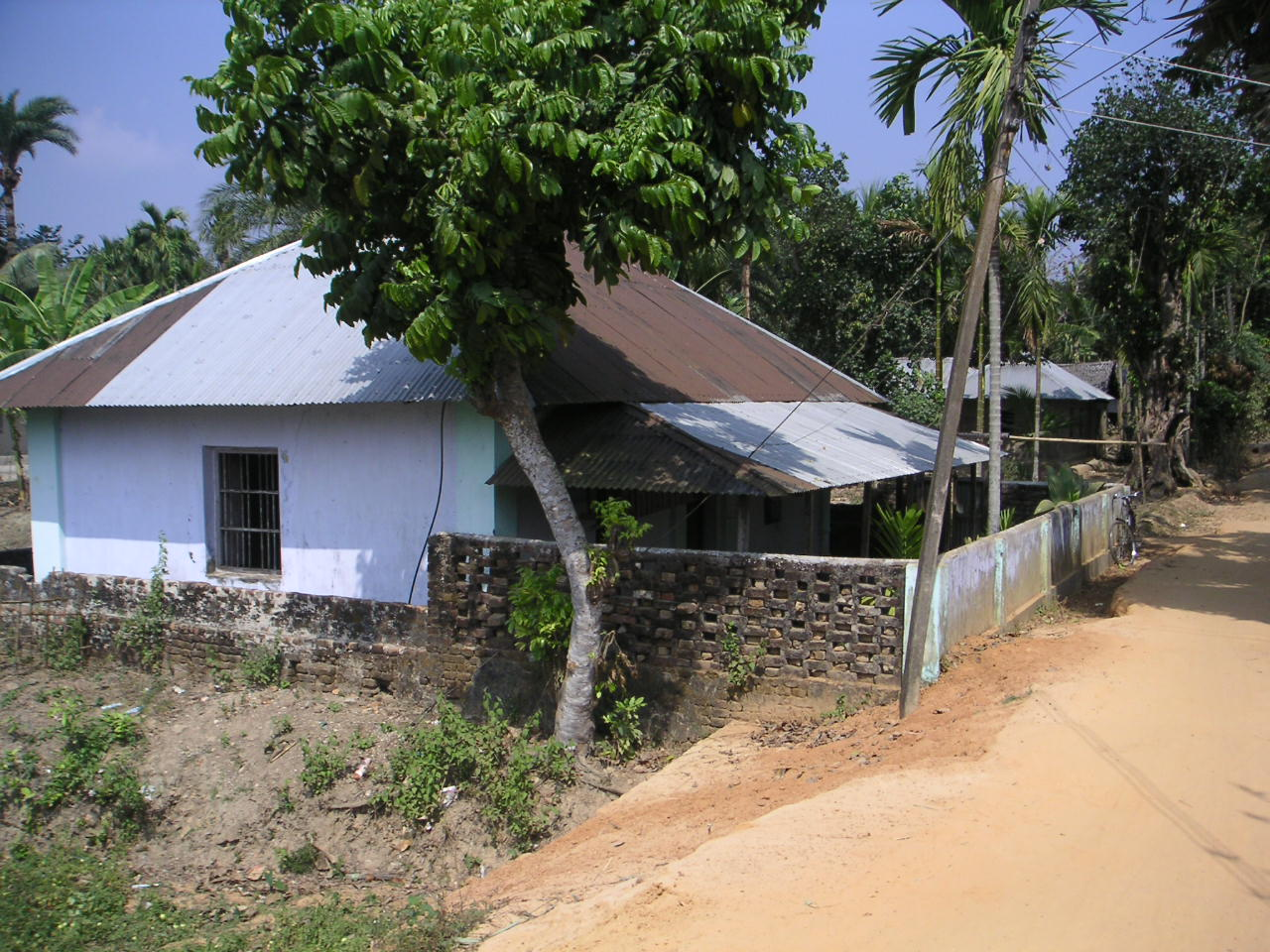
A rural mosque in Tripura, India, with a tin roof

Punched tin-plated steel, also called pierced tin, is an artisan technique originating in central Europe for creating functional and decorative housewares. Decorative piercing designs exist in a wide variety, based on local tradition and the artisan. Punched tin lanterns are the most common application of this artisan technique. The light of a candle shining through the pierced design creates a decorative light pattern in the room where it sits. Lanterns and other punched tin articles were created in the New World from the earliest European settlement. A well-known example is the Revere lantern, named after Paul Revere.

In America, pie safes and food safes were in use in the days before refrigeration. These were wooden cupboards of various styles and sizes – either floor standing or hanging cupboards meant to discourage vermin and insects and to keep dust from perishable foodstuffs. These cabinets had tinplate inserts in the doors and sometimes in the sides, punched out by the homeowner, cabinetmaker, or a tinsmith in varying designs to allow for air circulation while excluding flies. Modern reproductions of these articles remain popular in North America.

Window glass is most often made by floating molten glass on molten tin (float glass), resulting in a flat and flawless surface. This is also called the "Pilkington process".

Tin is used as a negative electrode in advanced Li-ion batteries. Its application is somewhat limited by the fact that some tin surfaces catalyze decomposition of carbonate-based electrolytes used in Li-ion batteries.

Tin(II) fluoride is added to some dental care products as stannous fluoride (SnF_{2}). Tin(II) fluoride can be mixed with calcium abrasives while the more common sodium fluoride gradually becomes biologically inactive in the presence of calcium compounds. It has also been shown to be more effective than sodium fluoride in controlling gingivitis.

Tin is used as a target to create laser-induced plasmas that act as the light source for extreme ultraviolet lithography.

=== Organotin compounds ===
Organotin compounds are organometallic compounds containing tin–carbon bonds. Worldwide industrial production of organotin compounds likely exceeds 50,000 tonnes.

==== PVC stabilizers ====
The major commercial application of organotin compounds is in the stabilization of PVC plastics. In the absence of such stabilizers, PVC would rapidly degrade under heat, light, and atmospheric oxygen, resulting in discolored, brittle products. Tin scavenges labile chloride ions (Cl^{−}), which would otherwise strip HCl from the plastic material. Typical tin compounds are carboxylic acid derivatives of dibutyltin dichloride, such as dibutyltin dilaurate.

==== Biocides ====
Some organotin compounds are relatively toxic, with both advantages and problems. They are used for biocidal properties as fungicides, pesticides, algaecides, wood preservatives, and antifouling agents. Tributyltin oxide is used as a wood preservative. Tributyltin is used for various industrial purposes such as slime control in paper mills and disinfection of circulating industrial cooling waters. Tributyltin was used as additive for ship paint to prevent growth of fouling organisms on ships, with use declining after organotin compounds were recognized as persistent organic pollutants with high toxicity for some marine organisms (the dog whelk, for example). The EU banned the use of organotin compounds in 2003, while concerns over the toxicity of these compounds to marine life and damage to the reproduction and growth of some marine species (some reports describe biological effects to marine life at a concentration of 1 nanogram per liter) have led to a worldwide ban by the International Maritime Organization. Many nations now restrict the use of organotin compounds to vessels greater than 25 m (82 ft) long. The persistence of tributyltin in the aquatic environment is dependent upon the nature of the ecosystem. Because of this persistence and its use as an additive in ship paint, high concentrations of tributyltin have been found in marine sediments located near naval docks. Tributyltin has been used as a biomarker for imposex in neogastropods, with at least 82 known species. With the high levels of TBT in the local inshore areas, due to shipping activities, the shellfish had an adverse effect. Imposex is the imposition of male sexual characteristics on female specimens where they grow a penis and a pallial vas deferens. A high level of TBT can damage mammalian endocrine glands, reproductive and central nervous systems, bone structure and gastrointestinal tract. Tributyltin also affect mammals, Including sea otters, whales, dolphins, and humans.

==== Organic chemistry ====
Some tin reagents are useful in organic chemistry. In the largest application, stannous chloride is a common reducing agent for the conversion of nitro and oxime groups to amines. The Stille reaction couples organotin compounds with organic halides or pseudohalides.

==== Li-ion batteries ====
Tin forms several inter-metallic phases with lithium metal, making it a potentially attractive material for battery applications. Large volumetric expansion of tin upon alloying with lithium and instability of the tin-organic electrolyte interface at low electrochemical potentials are the greatest challenges to employment in commercial cells. Tin inter-metallic compound with cobalt and carbon was implemented by Sony in its Nexelion cells released in the late 2000s. The composition of the active material is approximately Sn_{0.3}Co_{0.4}C_{0.3}. Research showed that only some crystalline facets of tetragonal (beta) Sn are responsible for undesirable electrochemical activity.

== Precautions ==
Cases of poisoning from tin metal, its oxides, and its salts are almost unknown. On the other hand, certain organotin compounds are almost as toxic as cyanide.

Exposure to tin in the workplace can occur by inhalation, skin contact, and eye contact. The US Occupational Safety and Health Administration (OSHA) set the permissible exposure limit for tin exposure in the workplace as 2 mg/m^{3} over an 8-hour workday. The National Institute for Occupational Safety and Health (NIOSH) determined a recommended exposure limit (REL) of 2 mg/m^{3} over an 8-hour workday. At levels of 100 mg/m^{3}, tin is immediately dangerous to life and health.

== See also ==
- Cassiterides (the mythical Tin Islands)
- Stannary
- Terne
- Tin pest
- Tin mining in Britain
- Tinning
- Whisker (metallurgy) (tin whiskers)

== Bibliography ==
- This article incorporates text from this source, which is in the public domain: Carlin, James F., Jr. (1998). "Significant events affecting tin prices since 1958". U.S. National Geodetic Survey
- Lide, David R., ed. (2006). Handbook of Chemistry and Physics (87th ed.). Boca Raton, Florida: CRC Press, Taylor & Francis Group. ISBN 978-0-8493-0487-3.
- Emsley, John (2001). "Tin". Nature's Building Blocks: An A–Z Guide to the Elements. Oxford, England, UK: Oxford University Press. pp. 445–450. ISBN 978-0-19-850340-8.
- Greenwood, Norman N.; Earnshaw, Alan (1997). Chemistry of the Elements (2nd ed.). Butterworth-Heinemann. doi:10.1016/C2009-0-30414-6. ISBN 978-0-08-037941-8.
- Heiserman, David L. (1992). "Element 50: Tin". Exploring Chemical Elements and their Compounds. New York: TAB Books. ISBN 978-0-8306-3018-9.
- MacIntosh, Robert M. (1968). "Tin". In Clifford A. Hampel (ed.). The Encyclopedia of the Chemical Elements. New York: Reinhold Book Corporation. pp. 722–732. LCCN 68-29938.
- Stwertka, Albert (1998). "Tin". Guide to the Elements (Revised ed.). Oxford University Press. ISBN 978-0-19-508083-4.
