= Mosaic gold =

Inorganic pigment used for gilding

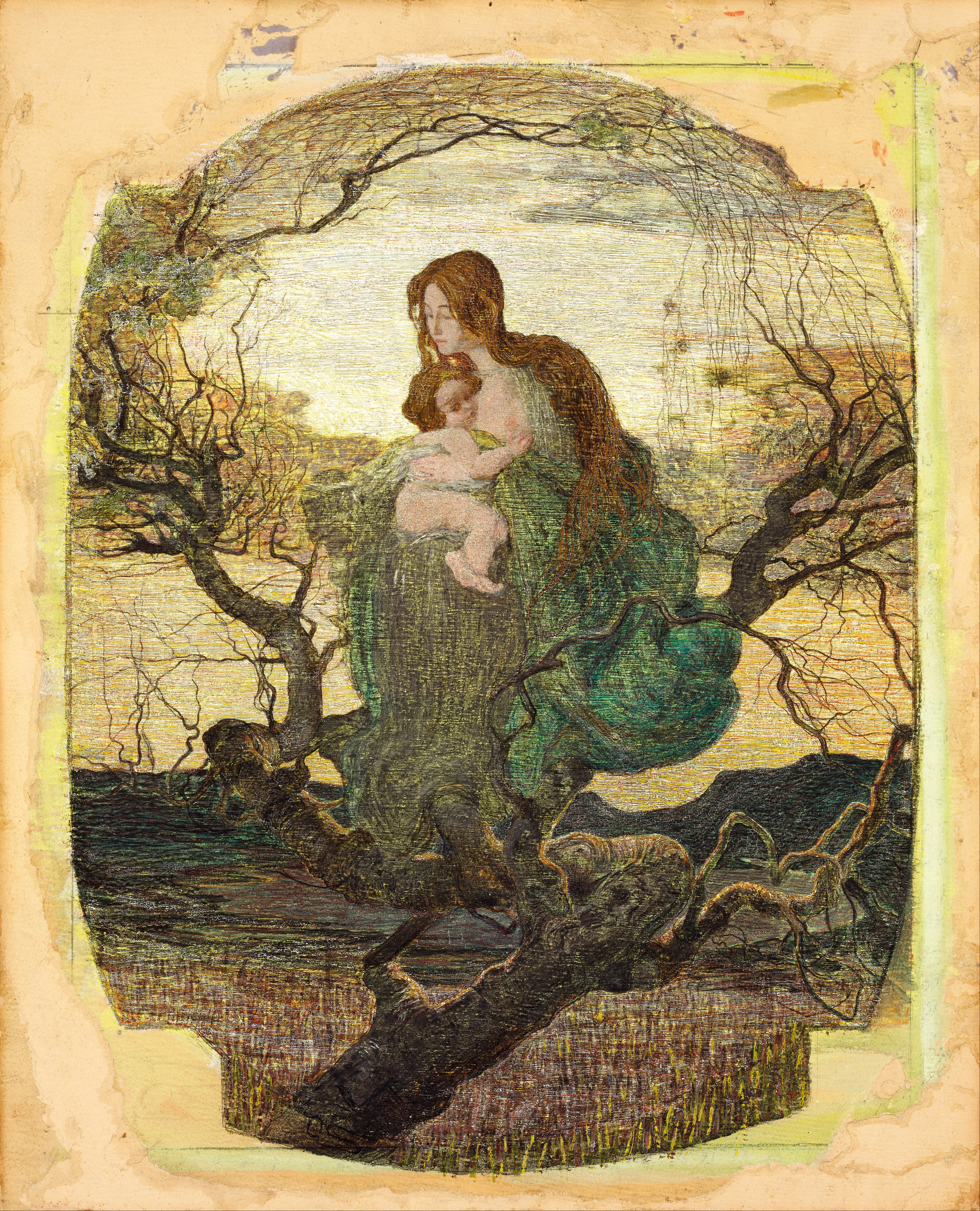
The Angel of Life by Giovanni Segantini. This work uses bronze powder, along with other media on paper.

Mosaic gold or bronze powder refers to tin(IV) sulfide as used as a pigment in bronzing and gilding wood and metal work. It is obtained as a yellow scaly crystalline powder. The alchemists referred to it as aurum musivum, or aurum mosaicum. The term mosaic gold has also been used to refer to ormolu and to cut shapes of gold leaf, some darkened for contrast, arranged as a mosaic. The term bronze powder may also refer to powdered bronze alloy.

A recipe for mosaic gold is already provided in the 3rd century A.D. treatise Baopuzi, composed by the Chinese alchemist Ge Hong. The earliest sources for its preparation in Europe, under the name porporina or purpurina, are the late 13th-century North Italian Liber colorum secundum Magistrum Bernardum and Cennino Cennini's Libro dell'arte from the 1420s. Instructions became more widespread and varied thereafter, the around 1500 recipe collection Liber illuministarum from Tegernsee Abbey in Bavaria alone offering six different methods for its preparation. Alchemists prepared it by combining mercury, tin, sal ammoniac, and sublimated sulfur (fleur de soufre), grinding, mixing, then setting them for three hours in a sand heat. The dirty sublimate being taken off, aurum mosaicum was found at the bottom of the matrass.

In the past it was used for medical purposes in most chronic and nervous ailments, and particularly convulsions of children; however, it is no longer recommended for any medical uses.

== See also ==
- List of inorganic pigments
