= INATIN =

INATIN (Indonesian Tin Exchange) which agreed to settle with the coordination of the Indonesia Commodity Derivative Exchange (ICDX) and PT Banda Graha Reksa. It was formally launched on February 1, 2012.

== Requirements ==
- Physical show, not futures
- At least 99.86 percent purity and has a brand
- Sellers and buyers should be members of ICDX and pay the membership fee
- Each lot consists of 5 metric tons of tin Free On Board priced in US dollars with minimum decrease/increase price $5 per lot
- Transaction fee 0.06 percent
- Payment/settlement is T+2, or 2 days after transaction; the tin sales are to be delivered through Mentok port and Pangkalan Balam port in Bangka Island

== Session ==
Before the trading session begins, Tin Commission will decide the minimum or suggested opening bid price. The session is only 15 minutes, from 2.30 to 2.45 p.m. West Indonesian Time (7.30 to 7.45 a.m. UTC time). One minute after closing, the closing price will be announced.

== LME, KLTM and INATIN ==
London Metal Exchange (LME) and Kuala Lumpur Tin Market (KLTM) are tin contract markets (not physical), while INATIN is a physical exchange.

== Members ==
Whoever fulfills the requirements:

- PT Timah (Persero) Tbk (IDX: TINS)
- PT Tambang Timah
- PT Timah Industri
- PT Kobatin
- PT Mitra Stannia Prima
- 3H Co. Ltd.(Korea)
- Gold Matrix Resources Pte Ltd
- Purple Products Pvt Ltd
- PT Comexindo International
- PT Refined Banka Tin
- Toyota, Mitsubishi and Hanwa still in the process as buyers

== Custodian ==
The custodian is PT Banda Graha Reksa, a state-owned company.

== Price maker ==
At the first trade on February 1, 2012 there were 9 members; they opened for an equivalent of a metric ton at $24,640, closing at $24,500. LME closed at $20,290. The transactions were still very low with only 2 lot (10 metric tons) transactions, but INATIN hopes it will change the price taker position to be a price maker.

== Conflict ==
About 90 percent of Indonesian Tin Association's (ITA) 28 members denounce INATIN: "We won't sell tin to that market." But the initial producer members above are the biggest tin producers with production at more than 50 percent.

Peraturan Menteri Perdagangan R.I. Nomor 32/M-DAG/PER/6/2013 stated that tin block and other types of tin should be traded first at bourse before the tin can be exported, for tin block initial August 30, 2013, while other types of tin initial Januari 1, 2015.
