= Liber illuministarum =

16th-century book about book painting

The Liber illuministarum is one of the largest extant late medieval collections of art technological instructions and recipes for book painting. It was gradually compiled between the end of the 15th and the beginning of 16th century in Tegernsee Abbey (Bavaria) by eight identifiable scribes, among them the Benedictine monastery's librarian Konrad Sartori (died 1531). Written on paper it was only bound and arranged into one volume in the 16th century. Having in the course of time lost several pages it extends over 231 folios and is since 1803 preserved as:

- Bavarian State Library (Munich, Germany), Cgm 821

== Content ==
In accordance with its full title Liber illuministarum pro fundamentis auri et coloribus ac consimilibus collectus ex diversis ('A book for/by the Illuminators for Gold grounds, Colours and Similar Matters, Collated from Various [Sources]') it unsystematically assembles circa 1.500 recipes and instructions for the arts and crafts written both in Medieval Latin and Southern dialect forms of Early New High German. The principal subjects treated are:

- the making of inks
- colours
- and their binders;
- papermaking
- the preparation of parchment and cured leather
- including their dyeing, gilding and silvering;
- calligraphy
- initials
- miniature painting
- ornaments
- recipes for the cleaning and refreshing of old books

This main body art technological instructions is supplemented by and interspersed with:

- the fragment of a sermon
- a short treatise on algebra

and notes on diverse matters, such as

- medicine
- cosmetics
- housekeeping
- horticulture, beekeeping, hunting and fishing
- fireworks
- magical potions and trinkets.

== Edition and translation ==
The Liber illuministarum was published with translations, commentaries and indices:

- Anna Bartl, Christoph Krekel, Martin Lautenschlager, Doris Oltrogge (edd., transl., comm.), Der Liber illuministarum aus Kloster Tegernsee, Edition, Übersetzung und Kommentar der kunsttechnologischen Rezepte, (Veröffentlichung des Instituts für Kunsttechnik und Konservierung im Germanischen Nationalmuseum 8), Stuttgart 2005, 883 pages. ISBN 978-3-515-10088-5
