= Tin cry =

Sound made by bending tin

Tin cry

Tin cry is the characteristic sound heard when a bar made of tin is bent. Variously described as a "screaming" or "crackling" sound, the effect is caused by the crystal twinning in the metal. The sound is not particularly loud, despite terms like "crying" and "screaming". It is very noticeable when a hot-dip tin-coated sheet metal is bent at high speed over rollers during processing.

Tin cry is often demonstrated using a simple science experiment. A bar of tin will "cry" repeatedly when bent until it breaks. The experiment can then be recycled by melting and recrystallizing the metal. The low melting point of tin, 231.9 °C (449.4 °F; 505.0 K), makes re-casting easy. Tin anneals at reasonably low temperature as well, normalizing tin's microstructure of crystallites/grains.

Although the cry is most typical of tin, a similar effect occurs in other metals, such as niobium, indium, zinc, cadmium, gallium, and solid mercury.
