= Tin(IV) sulfide =

- Sn^{4+}(S^{2−})_{2}

Names
- IUPAC name Tin(IV) sulfide
- Other names Tin disulfide, Stannic sulfide, Mosaic gold

Identifiers
CAS Number	1315-01-1
3D model (JSmol)	Interactive image; (S=Sn=S): Interactive image
ChEBI	CHEBI:50886
ChemSpider	21865812
ECHA InfoCard	100.013.867
EC Number	215-252-9
PubChem CID	73977; 15238661 (S=Sn=S)
UNII	YVY89V9BUH
CompTox Dashboard (EPA)	DTXSID101014322
- InChI: InChI=1S/2S.Sn/q2*-2;+4 Key: TUTLDIXHQPSHHQ-UHFFFAOYSA-N
- SMILES: [S-2].[S-2].[Sn+4]; (S=Sn=S): S=[Sn]=S

Properties
Chemical formula	S_{2}Sn
Molar mass	182.83 g·mol^{−1}
Appearance	Gold-yellow powder
Odor	Odorless
Density	4.5 g/cm^{3}
Melting point	600 °C (1,112 °F; 873 K) decomposes
Solubility in water	Insoluble
Solubility	Soluble in aq. alkalis, decompose in aqua regia Insoluble in alkyl acetates, acetone

Structure
Crystal structure	Rhombohedral, hP3
Space group	P3̅m1, No. 164
Point group	3̅ 2/m
Lattice constant	a = 3.65 Å, c = 5.88 Å α = 90°, β = 90°, γ = 120°
Coordination geometry	Octahedral (Sn^{4+})

Hazards
- GHS labelling
Pictograms	(GHS07: Exclamation mark)
Signal word	Warning
Hazard statements	H302, H312, H315, H319, H332, H335
Precautionary statements	P261, P280, P301+P312, P302+P352, P304+P340, P305+P351+P338, P332+P313
NFPA 704 (fire diamond)	1 0 0
- Except where otherwise noted, data are given for materials in their standard state (at 25 °C [77 °F], 100 kPa). verify (what is ?) Infobox references

Tin(IV) sulfide is a compound with the formula SnS_{2}. A brown, water-insoluble solid, it is a semiconductor with band gap 2.2 eV. It occurs naturally as the rare mineral berndtite.

== Synthesis and structure ==
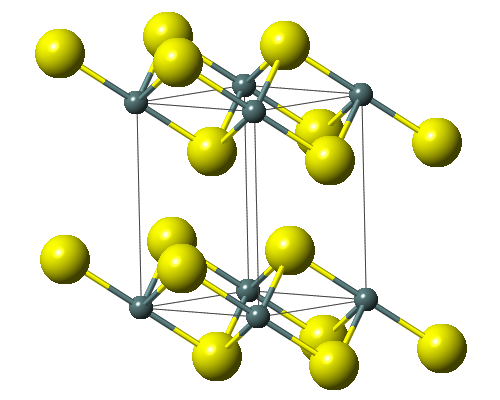
Fragment of the SnS_{2} lattice. Color code: yellow = S, gray = Sn.

The compound precipitates as a brown solid upon the addition of H_{2}S to solutions containing tin(IV) species. This reaction is reversed at low pH. It can also be prepared by heating finely ground Sn with excess sulfur.

The compound crystallizes in the cadmium iodide motif, with the Sn(IV) situated in "octahedral holes' defined by six sulfide centers.

The material reacts with sulfide salts to give a series of thiostannates with the formula [SnS_{2}]_{m}[S]^{2n−}_{n}. A simplified equation for this depolymerization reaction is:

SnS_{2} + S^{2−} → 1/x[SnS_{3}^{2−}]_{x}

== Potential uses ==
Crystalline SnS_{2} has a bronze color and is used in decorative coating where it is known as mosaic gold.

Tin (IV) sulfide has various uses in electrochemistry. It serves as an anode in prototypes of lithium-ion batteries. Intercalation with organometallic reagents is reversible.

It has also been evaluated as a component of supercapacitors, which could be used for energy storage.

== See also ==
- Mosaic Gold
