= Historiography of gunpowder and gun transmission =

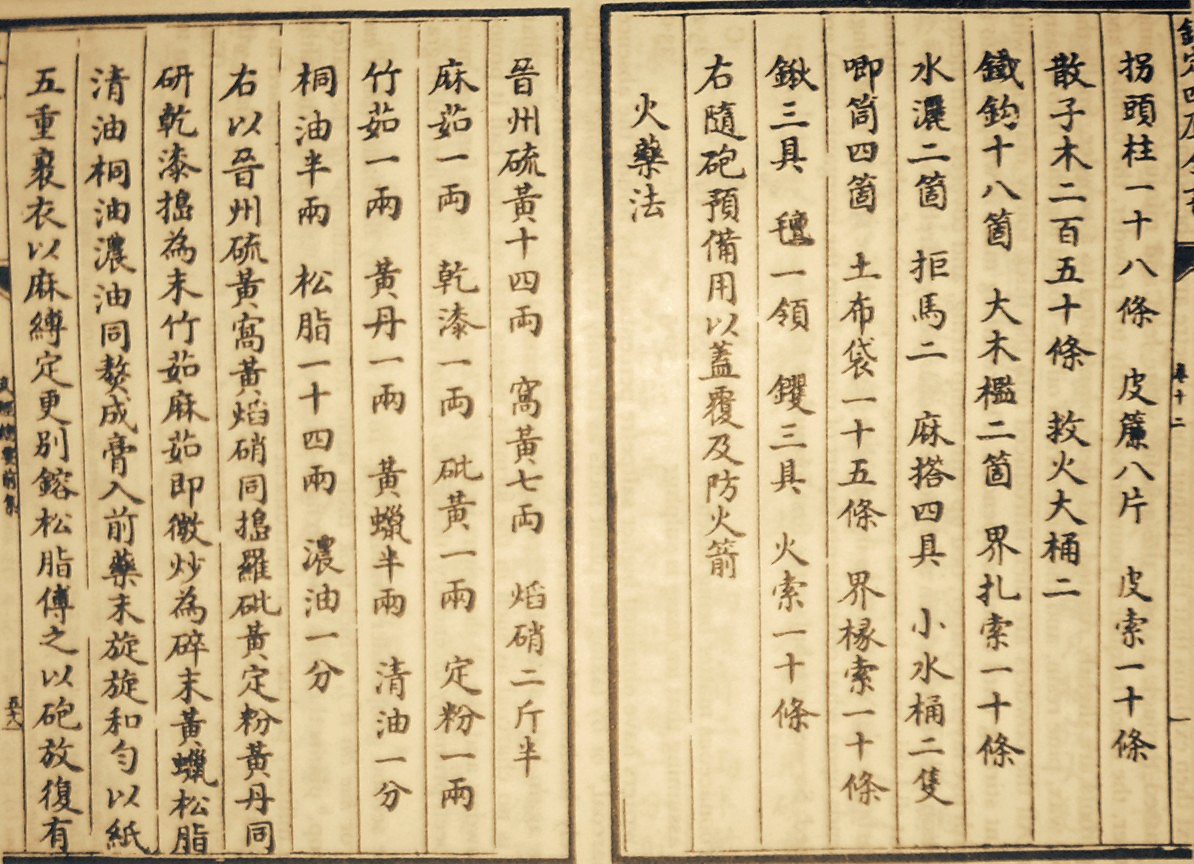
Earliest known written formula for gunpowder, from the Wujing Zongyao of 1044 CE.

In the history of gunpowder there are a range of theories about the transmission of the knowledge of gunpowder and guns from Imperial China to the rest of the world following the Song, Jin and Yuan dynasties. The earliest bronze guns found in China date back to the 13th century, with archaeological and textual evidence for previous nascent gunpowder technology developed beforehand. Scholars note the scarcity of records for firearms in the Middle East prior to the mid-14th century, and in Russia before the late 14th century, yet cannons already appeared in Europe by the early 14th century. This has led to theories that gunpowder or the gun was independently invented in Europe. Less accepted theories include gunpowder as being independently invented in the Middle East or South Asia.

== Theories of non-Chinese invention ==
The earliest gunpowder recipe and gunpowder weapons date to China's Song dynasty and the oldest extant guns appear in the Mongol-led Yuan dynasty of China. However, historian Tonio Andrade notes that there is a surprising scarcity of reliable evidence of firearms in Iran or Central Asia prior to the late 14th century. He argues that, in the Middle East, no guns are mentioned prior to the 1360s, while Russian records do not contain reliable mentions of firearms until 1382, after the gun's arrival in western Europe, despite their closer proximity and interactions with the Mongol empires.

=== European origin ===
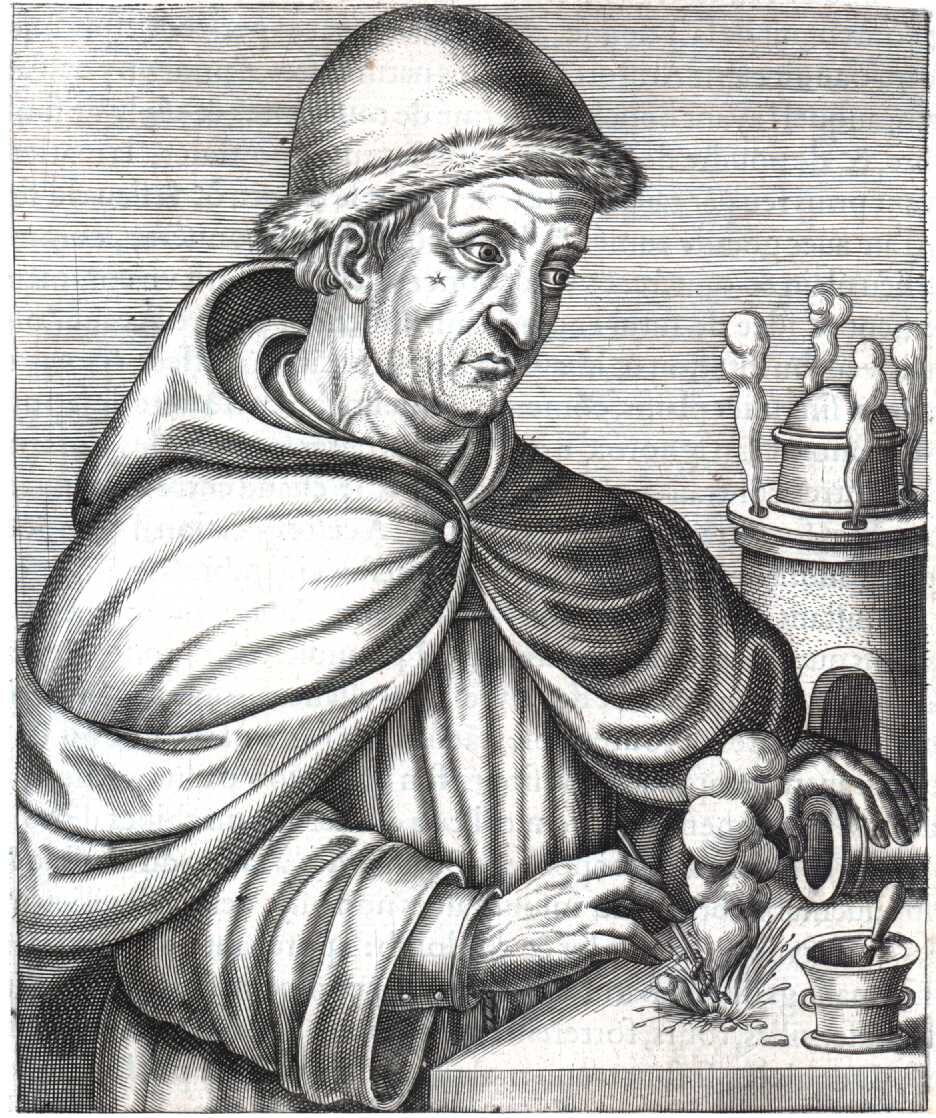
Portrait identifying Schwarz as the "inventor of artillery"

Although there is some evidence that points to the possible appearance of guns in Andalusia as early as the 1330s, Thomas T. Allsen says that "in the Latin West the first uncontestable evidence of firearms is from 1326, surprisingly somewhat earlier than in the lands that lie between China ... and western Europe. This has caused some doubt among historians on the gun transmission theory, and even whether or not there was a transmission at all. One dissident opinion comes from Stephen Morillo, Jeremy Black, and Paul Lococo's War in World History which argues that "the sources are not entirely clear about Chinese use of gunpowder in guns. There are references to bamboo and iron cannons, or perhaps proto-cannons, but these seem to have been small, unreliable, handheld weapons in this period. The Chinese do seem to have invented guns independently of the Europeans, at least in principle; but, in terms of effective cannon, the edge goes to Europe."

There was a stream of thought in Europe that emerged in the early 15th century that attributed the invention of both gunpowder and the gun to a certain Berthold Schwartz (Niger Berchtoldus or "Black Berthold"). By the turn of the 16th century, the story of Black Berthold was being repeated by numerous writers. In 1605, William Camden declared:

Some have sayled a long course as farre as China, the farthest part of the world, to fetch the invention of guns from thence, but we know the Spanicsh proverb 'long waies, long lies'. One writeth, I know not upon whose credit, that Roger Bacon, commonly called Friar Bacon, knew how to make an engine which with saltpetre and Brimstone, should prove notable for Batterie, but he, tendering the safety of mankind, would not discover it. The best approved authors agree that guns were invented in Germanie, by Berthold Swarte, a Monke skilful in Gebers Cookery or Alchimy, who tempering Brimstone and saltpetre in a mortar, perceived the force by casting up the stone which covered it, when a sparke fell upon it....

— William Camden

It is not exactly certain who Berthold was or if he ever existed as there are no contemporary records of him. Some consider him a mythical figure, used as a stand-in "for all the curious and ingenious experiments related to the new and dangerous mixture of saltpetre, sulfur (brimstone) and carbon." According to Henry Pratap Phillips, Berthold Schwartz was actually named Constantin Anchlitzen, and made gunpowder at Freiburg around the year 1330. J.R. Partington believes Schwartz is a purely legendary figure invented for the purpose of providing a German origin for gunpowder and cannon. Historian Jack Kelly concurs that Berthold was a "legendary figure" that existed to bolster German claims to the invention of the gun and to shield Europeans from the "fact that gunpowder, a critical force in their history, had emerged not from their own inventiveness."

Some European, especially German researchers of firearms history, believed that a German monk, Berthold Schwarz, is the inventor of gunpowder. However, there are different theories regarding various data concerning Berthold inventing gunpowder, including his last name, his nationality, his religion, the year, and location of the invention. The earliest German document mentioning him says that he was a Greek engaged in alchemy, rather than a monk. Later, there were theories saying that he was from Denmark, Prague, Cologne, Freiburg, Braunschweig, and Metz. In religious denomination, he was said by some to be a member of Franciscan faction of Christianity, and by others to be of the Dominique faction. No one can say for sure. When it comes to the year of his inventing gunpowder, there are a variety of claims, including 1,250, 1,313, 1,348, 1,354, 1,372, 1,380, and 1,393, with a difference as great as 143 years.

— Zhaochun Wang

The dating of Schwartz' invention of gunpowder, given by the Jesuit Athanasius Kircher as 1354, is also later than even the first usage of cannons in Europe. The chronological problem did not go unnoticed and in 1732, Hermann Boerhaave shifted the invention of gunpowder to Roger Bacon while Schwartz was relegated to the role of discovering its explosive military properties. In 1753, Peter Shaw dismissed Schwartz by pointing to European usage of cannons as early as 1338. The idea of Berthold Schwartz as the inventor of gunpowder had already begun to decline in the 17th century. Two years after writing about Schwartz' invention of gunpowder, Kircher changed his mind and said that the "invention of gunpowder, which is not possible to deny took place long before our times in China." In 1678, the commander Louis de Gaya downgraded Schwartz' status as an inventor to a mere transmitter. According to de Gaya, Schwartz obtained gunpowder, invented in China, from Tartars during his travels in Muscovy around 1380. The idea that gunpowder was a Chinese invention was not new to Europeans by then, and had been in circulation in Europe since at least the late 16th century. According to Juan de Mendoza, writing in 1585, the Chinese told the Portuguese that they had invented gunpowder, contradicting their own belief that "an Almane" had been the inventor. By the 18th century, missionary writers with access to Chinese records were convinced that gunpowder and firearms had been invented in China. While Europeans increasingly came to accept that gunpowder and other inventions such as paper, printing, and the compass had originated in China, they added an Orientalist twist to the narrative: "only rational Europeans were able to fully utilize the inventions to create the modern age, while the backward Chinese had squandered them." Belief in a European origin also never died entirely. A well known monograph on the history of artillery by Colonel Henry Hime, published in 1915, attributed the discovery of gunpowder to Roger Bacon and claimed gunpowder was brought to China from the West.

A deeply rooted misconception in the West holds that the Chinese never used gunpowder for war, that they employed one of the most potent inventions in the history of mankind for idle entertainment and children's whizbangs. This received wisdom is categorically false. The notion of China's benign relationship with gunpowder sprang in part from Western prejudices about the Chinese character. Some viewed the Chinese as dilettantes who stumbled onto the secret of gunpowder but couldn't envision its potential. Others saw them as pacifist sages who wisely turned away from its destructive possibilities.

— Jack Kelly

Scholars suggest that the lack of gunpowder weapons in a well-traveled Venetian's catalogue for a new crusade in 1321 implies that guns were unknown in Europe up until this point, while the earliest Latin and Arabic descriptions of purifying saltpeter, a key ingredient in gunpowder, does not appear until the 13th century, seven centuries after the Chinese. Others have tried to extrapolate ancient mentions of producing thunder as proof of gunpowder, but invariably run into problems with dating, anachronisms, and interpolations, leading modern arms historians to conclude that true gunpowder was unknown in Europe before the 13th century.

=== Islamic origin ===
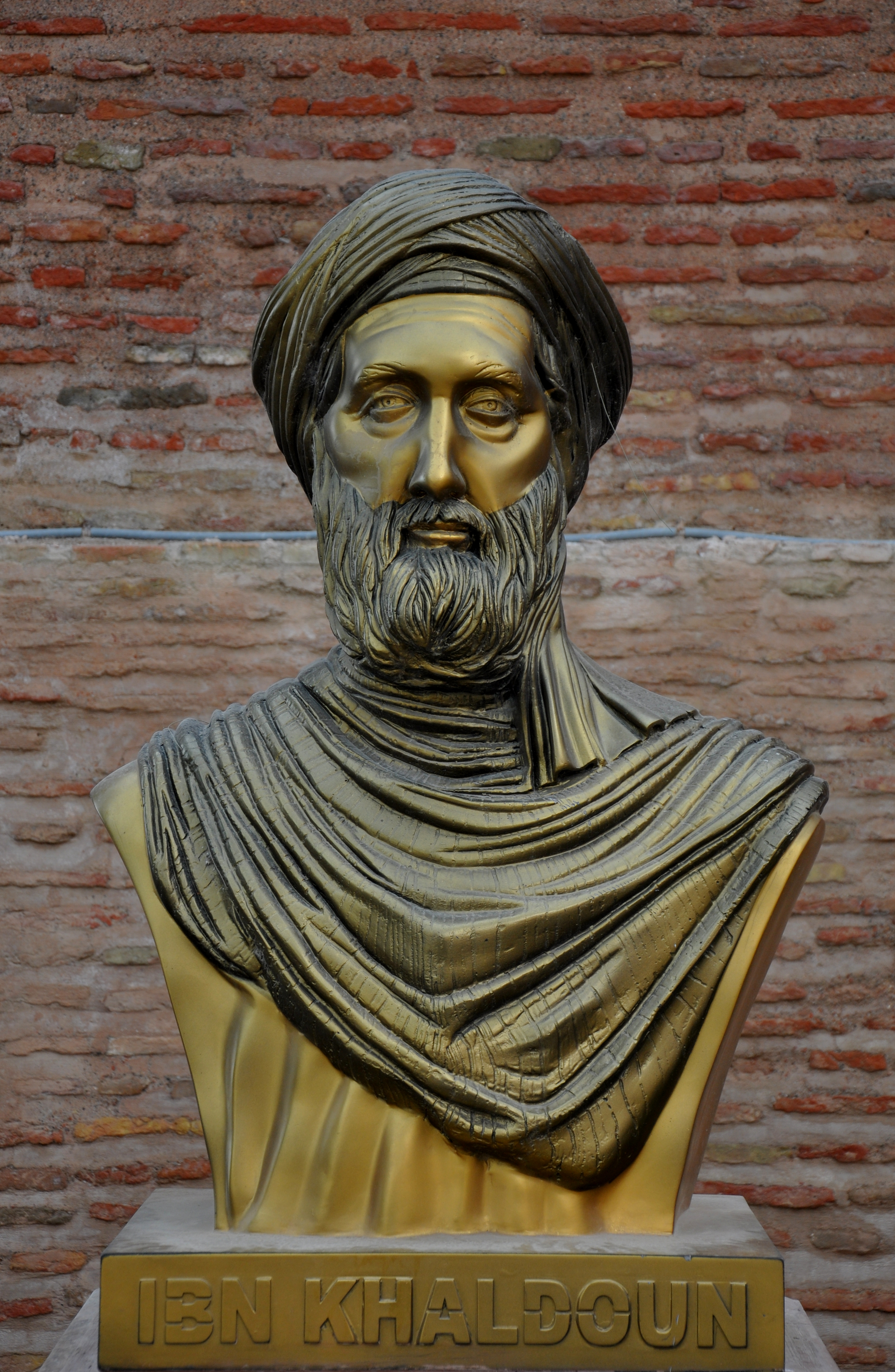
Bust of Ibn Khaldun

There is an independent invention theory supporting an Islamic origin of the gun, citing the Mamluk deployment of hand cannons in 1260 and a passage by Ibn Khaldun on the Marinid Siege of Sijilmassa in 1274: "[The Sultan] installed siege engines ... and gunpowder engines ..., which project small balls of iron. These balls are ejected from a chamber ... placed in front of a kindling fire of gunpowder; this happens by a strange property which attributes all actions to the power of the Creator." The passage, dated to 1382, and its interpretation has been rejected as anachronistic by most historians, who urge caution regarding claims of Islamic firearms use in the 1204–1324 period as late medieval Arabic texts used the same word for gunpowder, naft, as they did for an earlier incendiary, naphtha. Needham believes Ibn Khaldun was speaking of fire lances or proto-guns rather than hand cannon.

Historian Ahmad Y. al-Hassan, based on his analysis of 14th-century Arabic manuscripts which he argues to be copies of earlier texts, claims that hand cannons were used at the Battle of Ain Jalut in 1260. However Hassan's claims have been refuted by other historians such as David Ayalon, Iqtidar Alam Khan, Joseph Needham, Tonio Andrade, and Gabor Ágoston. Khan argues that it was the Mongols who introduced gunpowder to the Islamic world, and believes cannons only reached Mamluk Egypt in the 1370s. According to Needham, fire lances or proto-guns were known to Muslims by the late 13th century and early 14th century. However the term midfa, dated to textual sources from 1342 to 1352, cannot be proven to be true hand-guns or bombards, and contemporary accounts of a metal-barrel cannon in the Islamic world do not occur until 1365. Needham also concludes that in its original form the term midfa refers to the tube or cylinder of a naphtha projector (flamethrower), then after the invention of gunpowder it meant the tube of fire lances, and eventually it applied to the cylinder of hand-gun and cannon. Similarly, Andrade dates the textual appearance of cannon in middle eastern sources to the 1360s. Gabor Ágoston and David Ayalon believe the Mamluks had certainly used siege cannon by the 1360s, but earlier uses of cannon in the Islamic World are vague with a possible appearance in the Emirate of Granada by the 1320s, however evidence is inconclusive.

=== Indian origin ===
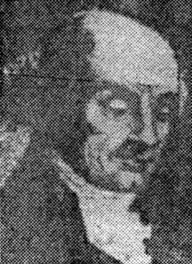
Nathaniel Brassey Halhed (25 May 1751 – 18 February 1830) was an English Orientalist and philologist.

The idea that that ancient Hindus had knowledge of gunpowder traces back to two 18th-century authors: N.B. Halhed and Q. Craufurd. Halhed's Persian translation of a Sanskrit digest of laws, Code of Gentoo Laws (1776), translates agni-astra as "firearms" or "fire-arrow discharged from bamboo," and sataghni, which literally means "hundred-killer" as "cannon." Craufurd's text published in 1790 thought the old Hindus used gunpowder but was doubtful of their use before Europeans. In 1848, Professor Wilson, director of the Asiatic Society at Calcutta, wrote that Indians were well acquainted with gunpowder and that rockets were an Indian invention. According to H.M. Elliot's The History of India as Told by its own Historians (1875), saltpetre may have possibly been used in explosives mentioned in the Ramayana and Sri Bhagavat.

There is no clear proof that gunpowder and rockets were known in any other country earlier than in China. J. Dubois (1765-1848) maintained that rockets were invented in India as early as 300 BCE, on the grounds that the ancient Sanskrit classic, the Rāmāyaṇa, spoke of vāṇa or bāṇa, which was at one time thought to mean 'rocket'. W. Egerton regarded the agnyastra of the Vedic Hymns as a type of rocket. Further examination of the Rāmayaṇa shows, however, that the term vāṇa or bāṇa simply means an arrow shot from a bow'.

— Peter Lorge

In 1880, Gustav Oppert claimed that the oldest documents describing gunpowder were the Sanskrit texts Sukraniti and Nitiprakasika. The Sukraniti contains descriptions of firearms and a formula for agni-curna (fire-powder) or 'suvarcilavana' (well-shining salt) very similar to that mentioned the Wujing Zongyao: 5 parts saltpetre, 1 part sulphur, and 1 part charcoal. The two firearms mentioned in the Sukraniti are a musket and a cart-drawn gun. There are no definite dates for these works despite claims of their antiquity. Oppert uses archaeological evidence from the ancient temple carvings in India, where soldiers are depicted carrying or in some cases firing the firearms, as proof of ancient use of firearms. Most of these temples are not older than 500 years except Tirupallani temple. However he claims the use of firearms in Sukraniti as authentic and the use of firearms and gunpowder in India since the ancient Vedic period (1500–500 BCE).

The ingredients listed in Sukraniti as constituents for gunpowder such as realgar, opiment, lac, camphor, indigo, pine gum, magnetic oxide of iron, vermillion, graphite are used in the manufacture of incendiary weapons in Arthashastra and also appear in Chinese accounts.

The Arthashastra lists recipes for explosive and inflammable powder called 'agnisamyogas' or 'agniyoga' which J.R. Partington notes are very similar to gunpowder recipes quoted in Chinese, Arabic and European texts. However they do not contain saltpetre. A. Kalyanamaran argues that sulphur was not needed to create gunpowder and nitre could be obtained from fermented dung mentioned in the ingredients. The Greek historian Philostratos cites a letter written by Alexander saying that the reason why the Greek army refrained from advancing from Hydaspis to Ganges was because of the frightful dangers it encountered when people of Oxydraces threw flaming thunderbolts from the top of their forts. H. Wilkinson, who also believes Greek Fire was first discovered by the Indians, considers this as the earliest evidence of gunpowder in the world. According to J. Backman, gunpowder was invented in India and brought to Europe by Muslims. A device in the Arthashastra called ulka is used as a shower of firebrand which makes a thunder sound (or noise of drumming) in the sky which according to the Arthashastra is used by astrologists to show it to the enemy subjects on the day of their birth star. Authors such as A 7th century Chinese text mentions that people in northwest India were familiar with saltpetre and used it to produce purple flames.

Nitisara, variously dated between 4th century BCE – 6th century CE, is a treatise by a Buddhist scholar named Kamandaka mentions gunfiring (nalikadibhdi) and states that the bodyguards of the king should rouse him with gun-firing if he indulges in girls, drinks, bouts etc. The gun firing was probably shotless military pyrotechnic using tubular weapons (although Oppert states that another word 'Nadika'' is also used in one of the text's version and may well mean gongs).

Muhammad ibn Zakariya al-Razi mentions in a treaties dated 910 a material called 'Indian salt', which he describes as "black and friable, with very little glitter," which has been interpreted as saltpetre by Berthelot but this is disputed by Joseph Needham. According to Firishta, Mehmud Ghaznavi (r. 999–1030) employed 1,008 cannon (top) and muskets (tufang) during his battle of Peshawar with Kabul Shahi king Anandapal. In a text called Mujmalut Tawarikh dated to 1126 which was translated from Arabic which itself was based on an original Sanskrit work, some type of grenade shaped like a terracotta elephant with a fuse is mentioned which was placed in the army van and when the invading army drew near, it exploded and the flames destroyed great portion of that army.

Many western military and arms historians, as well as some Indian scholars, have cast doubts on the authenticity of the Sukraniti, mainly for two reasons. First, this work could not be dated with reasonable certainty and, second, the descriptions of gunpowder and firearms given in it appear to be far too advanced for the period to which this work is generally assigned. A few scholars are also of the opinion that the entire book is a clever piece of forgery.

— Henry Pratap Phillips

According to Henry Pratap Phillips, some content in the Sanskrit works resemble that found in the Wujing Zongyao and it is possible that it was borrowed from the latter. However he believes it is the opposite and the gunpowder formula in the Wujing Zongyao came from the Sukraniti. Phillips and Oppert both consider The Rajalakshminarayana Hradaya, which Oppert dates to a "very remote period," as proof of ancient Indian knowledge of gunpowder since it mentions charcoal, sulphur, and other materials in the preparation of fire. The lack of saltpetre is explained by Phillips as a conscious omission for the sake of secrecy.

The Chinese texts are usually fairly precisely dated, whilst Indian works are often not. This difficulty must not be allowed to impair the interest or value of Indian works, but they must also be examined from the point of view of their scientific and technical contents with due care and with a suitably critical attitude. I feel that Oppert's treatment does not satisfy this requirement.

— J.R. Partington

J.R. Partington rejected Oppert's claims in his A History of Greek Fire and Gunpowder. Partington believes that the sataghni mentioned in Sanskrit text was an iron-mace rather than a cannon while Joseph Needham is of the opinion that its translation as cannon cannot be sustained. The word for cannon, nalika, does not appear in any Sanskrit dictionary, and the source of Sukraniti is the mythical Sukracharya. There is also no classical Sanskrit word for saltpetre while shoraka in late Sanskrit is derived from Persian. Rajendralal Mitra raised doubts about the age of another work by Usanas, Nitisara of Sukracharya, noting that it contains descriptions of firearms as they were a hundred years ago. In Partington's opinion the work is legendary. In 1902, P.C. Ray raised doubts about the authenticity of textual evidence supporting ancient Hindu knowledge of gunpowder. Ray pointed out that the gunpowder mixture of 4:1:1 saltpetre, charcoal, and sulphur found in Sukraniti was the most efficient for guns and was not known in Europe until the 16th century, leading him to believe that the content was an interpolation by "the handiwork of some charlatan." P.K. Gode provided textual evidence that pyrotechnical recipes recorded in the Sanskrit treatise, Kautukacintamani, were copied from a Chinese source. Some scholars based on the fact that it mentions matchlock firearms date the text to the modern period. Similarly H.L. Blackmore wrote in 1965 that Oppert's theories were absurd and no proper attempt to date the sources had been made. H.W.L. Hime goes as far as to say that "early Indian gunpowder is definitely a fiction" while Partington calls it a "legend." According to Kaushik Roy, the ancient and medieval Indians used saltpetre for incendiary devices but not for gunpowder.

== Arguments for and against Chinese transmission ==
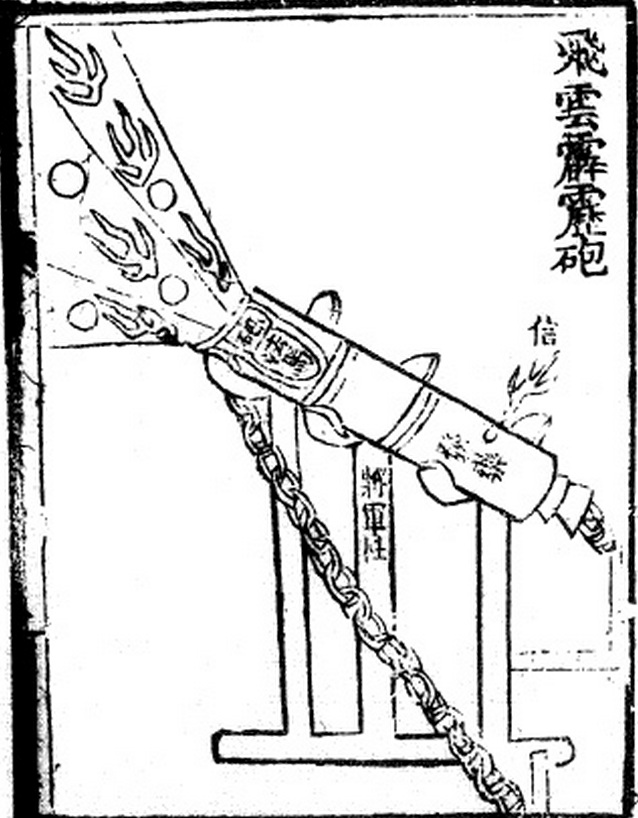
An illustration of a 'flying-cloud thunderclap-eruptor,' a cannon firing thunderclap bombs, from the Huolongjing.

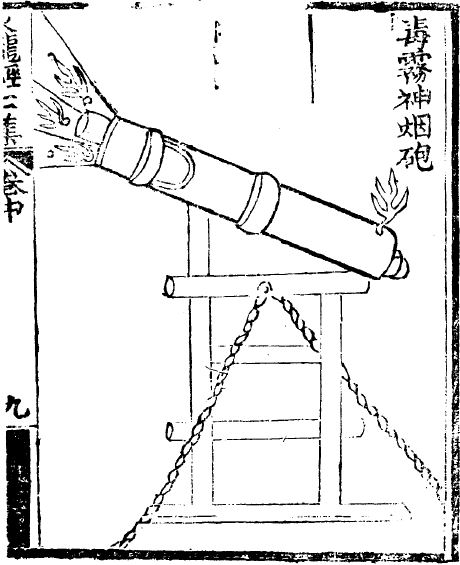
A 'poison fog divine smoke eruptor' (du wu shen yan pao) as depicted in the Huolongjing. Small shells emitting poisonous smoke are fired.

=== Transmission theory ===
According to Tonio Andrade, the nature and etymology of gunpowder in Europe intrinsically favor of the transmission theory rather than an independent invention. While records of gunpowder weapons and their evolution into the gun exist in China, "there are no records of any such developments in Europe," and the arrival of the gun in Europe was such that it "appears fully formed around 1326." There are also older and more numerous formulas of gunpowder using a variety of different proportions of key ingredients – saltpeter, sulphur, and charcoal – which he believes is proof of its evolution and experimentation in China, where gunpowder was first applied to warfare as an incendiary, then explosive, and finally as a propellant. In contrast gunpowder formulas in Europe appear both later and offer very little divergence from the already ideal proportions for the purpose of creating an explosive and propellant powder. Kelly DeVries points out the idea that European records contained zero evidence of gunpowder developments is not strictly true, as compilers of early gunpowder recipes in Europe understood that should the instrument carrying gunpowder be enclosed on one end, the gunpowder reaction inside would produce "flying fire."

Another facet of the gunpowder transmission theory is the appearance of gunpowder in Europe ready made for military usage, and is generally referred to as gunpowder rather than a civilian term such as the Chinese "fire-drug," which suggests an originally non-military usage, whereas in Europe it was almost immediately and exclusively used for its military qualities. Muslim terms of saltpeter may also point toward a gunpowder transmission, if not the gun itself, as an Andalusian botanist referred to it as "Chinese snow," while in Persia it was called "Chinese salt." Joseph Needham claims that "all the long preparations and tentative experiments were made in China, and everything came to Islam and the West fully fledged, whether it was the fire-lance or the explosive bomb, the rocket or the metal-barrel hand-gun and bombard." However, theories of European, Islamic, and Indian origins for the gun and gunpowder still persist today in tandem with the transmission theory.

=== Mongol vector ===
Proponents of China as the inventor of gunpowder and the gun emphasize the older history of gunpowder evolution as attested by historical records and archaeological samples in China, its less obviously militarily focused name as "fire medicine," the Mongol role as a catalyst in disseminating gunpowder technology, and criticizes the scant or absent evidence of prior experimentation with gunpowder in Europe for non-military purposes before the arrival of the gun. However, there are still several blanks in the history of a gun transmission theory and the questions they raise which its proponents have been unable to answer. The rapid spread of guns across Eurasia, only 50 years from China to Europe, with non-existent evidence of its route from one extreme of the continent to the other, remains a mystery. Other Chinese inventions such as the compass, paper, and printing took centuries to reach Europe, with events such as the Battle of Talas as perhaps a possible takeoff point for discussion. No such event exists on record for either gunpowder or the gun. There is simply no clear route of transmission, and while the Mongols are often pointed to as the likeliest vector, Timothy May points out that "there is no concrete evidence that the Mongols used gunpowder weapons on a regular basis outside of China." According to Kate Raphael, the list of Chinese specialists recruited by Genghis Khan and Hulagu provided by the History of Yuan includes only carpenters and blacksmiths, but no gunpowder workers. A conclusion most military historians in the transmission camp have come to is that the rapid diffusion of gunpowder and the gun is probably best explained by its clear military applications.

Although the spread of gunpowder is directly related to the rise of the Mongols and the Pax Mongolica, it is unclear whether the Mongols themselves contributed to the spread. Some historians have claimed the Mongols used gunpowder weapons, essentially bombs hurled by catapults, in the Middle East and perhaps Eastern Europe; unfortunately there is no definite documentary or archaeological evidence to confirm it. Considering the Mongols rarely met a weapon they did not like, we can be certain that if they found a way to transport it safely it would have been incorporated into their arsenal outside China. Nonetheless, it remains speculation... However... the Mongols used it in their wars against the Jin, the Song and in their invasions of Japan.

— Timothy May

=== Independent invention theory ===
Opponents of the transmission theory criticize the vagueness of Chinese records on the specific usage of gunpowder in weaponry, the existence of gunpowder or possibly lack thereof in incendiary weapons as described by Chinese documents, the weakness of Chinese firearms, the non-existent route of diffusion or evidence of guns between Europe and China before 1326, and emphasize the independent evolution of superior guns in Europe. However, this line of thought is problematic for a number of reasons. Notably, there is an acute dearth of any significant evidence of evolution or experimentation with gunpowder or gunpowder weapons leading up to the gun in 1326, which can be found in China. Gunpowder appeared in Europe primed for military usage as an explosive and propellant, bypassing a process which took centuries of Chinese experimentation with gunpowder weaponry to reach, making a nearly instantaneous and seamless transition into gun warfare, as its name suggests. Furthermore, early European gunpowder recipes shared identical defects with Chinese recipes such as the inclusion of the poisons sal ammoniac and arsenic, which provide no benefit to gunpowder. Bert S. Hall explains this phenomenon in his Weapons and Warfare in Renaissance Europe: Gunpowder, Technology, and Tactics by drawing upon the gunpowder transmission theory, explaining that "gunpowder came [to Europe], not as an ancient mystery, but as a well-developed modern technology, in a manner very much like twentieth-century 'technology-transfer' projects." In a similar vein Peter Lorge supposes that the Europeans experienced gunpowder "free from preconceived notions of what could be done," in contrast to China, "where a wide range of formulas and a broad variety of weapons demonstrated the full range of possibilities and limitations of the technologies involved." There is also the vestige of Chinese influence, and not European, on Muslim terminology of some gunpowder related items such as saltpeter, which has been described as either Chinese snow or salt, fireworks which were called Chinese flowers, and rockets which were called Chinese arrows. Moreover, Europeans in particular experienced great difficulty in obtaining saltpeter, a primary ingredient of gunpowder which was relatively scarce in Europe compared to China, and had to be obtained from "distant lands or extracted at high cost from soil rich in dung and urine." Thomas Arnold believes that the similarities between early European cannons and contemporary Chinese models suggests a direct transmission of cannon making knowledge from China rather than a home grown development. Whatever the truth may be, the first unambiguous references to guns appeared in Europe in the 1320s.

== Bibliography ==
- Ágoston, Gábor (2005), Guns for the Sultan: Military Power and the Weapons Industry in the Ottoman Empire, Cambridge University Press, ISBN 978-0-521-60391-1
- Andrade, Tonio (2016), The Gunpowder Age: China, Military Innovation, and the Rise of the West in World History, Princeton University Press, ISBN 978-0-691-13597-7.
- Arnold, Thomas (2001), The Renaissance at War, Cassell & Co, ISBN 978-0-304-35270-8
- Bachrach, David Stewart (July 2008). "Review of Gunpowder, Explosives and the State: A Technological History". Technology and Culture. 49 (3). Aldershot: Ashgate: 785–786. doi:10.1353/tech.0.0051. S2CID 111173101.
- Buchanan, Brenda J. (2006), Gunpowder, Explosives and the State: A Technological History, Routledge, ISBN 978-0-7546-5259-5
- Chase, Kenneth (2003), Firearms: A Global History to 1700, Cambridge University Press, ISBN 978-0-521-82274-9.
- Cressy, David (2013), Saltpeter: The Mother of Gunpowder, Oxford University Press
- Kalyanaraman, A. (1903). The Saga Of The Indo-aryans.
- Kelly, Jack (2004), Gunpowder: Alchemy, Bombards, & Pyrotechnics: The History of the Explosive that Changed the World, Basic Books, ISBN 978-0-465-03718-6.
- Khan, Iqtidar Alam (1996). "Coming of Gunpowder to the Islamic World and North India: Spotlight on the Role of the Mongols". Journal of Asian History. 30: 41–45.
- Khan, Iqtidar Alam (2004), Gunpowder and Firearms: Warfare in Medieval India, Oxford University Press
- Khan, Iqtidar Alam (2008), Historical Dictionary of Medieval India, The Scarecrow Press, Inc., ISBN 978-0-8108-5503-8
- Liang, Jieming (2006), Chinese Siege Warfare: Mechanical Artillery & Siege Weapons of Antiquity, Singapore, Republic of Singapore: Leong Kit Meng, ISBN 978-981-05-5380-7
- Lorge, Peter (2005), Warfare in China to 1600, Routledge
- Lorge, Peter A. (2008), The Asian Military Revolution: from Gunpowder to the Bomb, Cambridge University Press, ISBN 978-0-521-60954-8
- Lu, Yongxiang (2015), A History of Chinese Science and Technology 2
- May, Timothy (2012), The Mongol Conquests in World History, Reaktion Books
- Morillo, Stephen (2008), War in World History: Society, Technology, and War from Ancient Times to the Present, Volume 1, To 1500, McGraw-Hill, ISBN 978-0-07-052584-9
- Needham, Joseph (1971), Science & Civilization in China: Volume 4 Part 3, Cambridge University Press
- Needham, Joseph (1980), Science & Civilisation in China: Volume 5 Part 4, Cambridge University Press, ISBN 978-0-521-08573-1
- Needham, Joseph (1986). Science & Civilisation in China: Volume 5, Chemistry and Chemical Technology, Part 7, Military Technology: The Gunpowder Epic. Cambridge University Press. ISBN 978-0-521-30358-3.
- Oppert, Gustav Salomon (1880). On the weapons, army organisation, and political maxims of the ancient Hindus, with special reference to gunpowder and firearms. Albrecht Weber; Lakshmīkānta Varmā; Śukra.; Vaiśaṃpāyana. Madras: Higginbotham.
- Partington, J.R. (1999), A History of Greek Fire and Gunpowder, Baltimore: Johns Hopkins University Press, ISBN 978-0-8018-5954-0
- Phillips, Henry Prataps (2016), The History and Chronology of Gunpowder and Gunpowder Weapons (c.1000 to 1850), Notion Press, ISBN 9789352067633
- Purton, Peter (2010), A History of the Late Medieval Siege, 1200–1500, Boydell Press, ISBN 978-1-84383-449-6
- Raphael, Kate (2011). Muslim fortresses in the Levant: between Crusaders and Mongols. Culture and civilization in the Middle East. Vol. 23. London: Routledge. ISBN 978-0-4155-6925-5.
- Roy, Kaushik (2014). Military Transition in Early Modern Asia, 1400–1750. London: Bloomsbury Academic. ISBN 978-1-7809-3765-6.
