= Regulator of CO metabolism =

Heme protein transcription factor

Regulator of CO metabolism 1

Identifiers
- Organism: Paraburkholderia xenovorans
- Symbol: rcoM1
- UniProt: Q13YL3
Search for
- Structures: Swiss-model
- Domains: InterPro

Regulator of CO metabolism 2

Identifiers
- Organism: Paraburkholderia xenovorans
- Symbol: rcoM2
- UniProt: Q13IY4
Search for
- Structures: Swiss-model
- Domains: InterPro

Regulator of CO Metabolism (RcoM) is a heme-containing transcription factor found in bacteria that senses carbon monoxide (CO). In the presence of carbon monoxide, this protein upregulates expression of genes involved in carbon monoxide oxidation or carbon monoxide stress response. RcoM is functionally related to another heme-containing transcription factor, CooA, but RcoM shares no structural relationship with CooA.

== Structure ==
RcoM is composed of an N-terminal Per-Arnt-Sim PAS domain, which contains an Fe(II) heme cofactor, and a C-terminal DNA-binding LytTR domain. CO binding by the PAS domain is very high affinity (~10^{−10} M^{−1}) and elicits changes in DNA-binding activity, the nature of which is not fully known.

== Mechanism ==
RcoM proteins are single-component, heme-based transcription factors that combine an N-terminal PAS heme-sensor domain with a C-terminal LytTR DNA-binding domain. The PAS domain binds a single molecule of heme, while the LytTR domain recognizes triplet direct-repeat motifs upstream of carbon monoxide (CO) oxidation genes within the cox regulon.

RcoM homologs, including those from Paraburkholderia xenovorans, function as homodimers. In the ferrous Fe(II) state, RcoM-1 proteins typically coordinate heme with a histidine and a methionine ligand; CO replaces the methionine ligand and binds directly to the heme, activating the protein for high-affinity DNA binding.

RcoM paralogs differ in ligand coordination and CO-responsive behavior. RcoM-1 acts as a low-CO “accumulating” switch with histidine/methionine heme ligation and relatively low-affinity DNA binding, whereas RcoM-2 is a cysteine-ligated hemoprotein that undergoes a redox-mediated ligand switch, resulting in high-affinity CO binding and enhanced DNA recognition in the CO-bound state. Both paralogs regulate microbial CO metabolism genes, particularly under conditions of persistent CO exposure.

== Potential therapeutic applications ==
A genetically engineered RcoM truncate has been prepared that acts as a high affinity carbon monoxide sequestration agent with high selectivity over oxygen. This engineered RcoM could potentially be used to treat carbon monoxide poisoning.
