= CooA =

Heme-containing bacterial transcription factor

Carbon monoxide oxidation system transcription regulator CooA
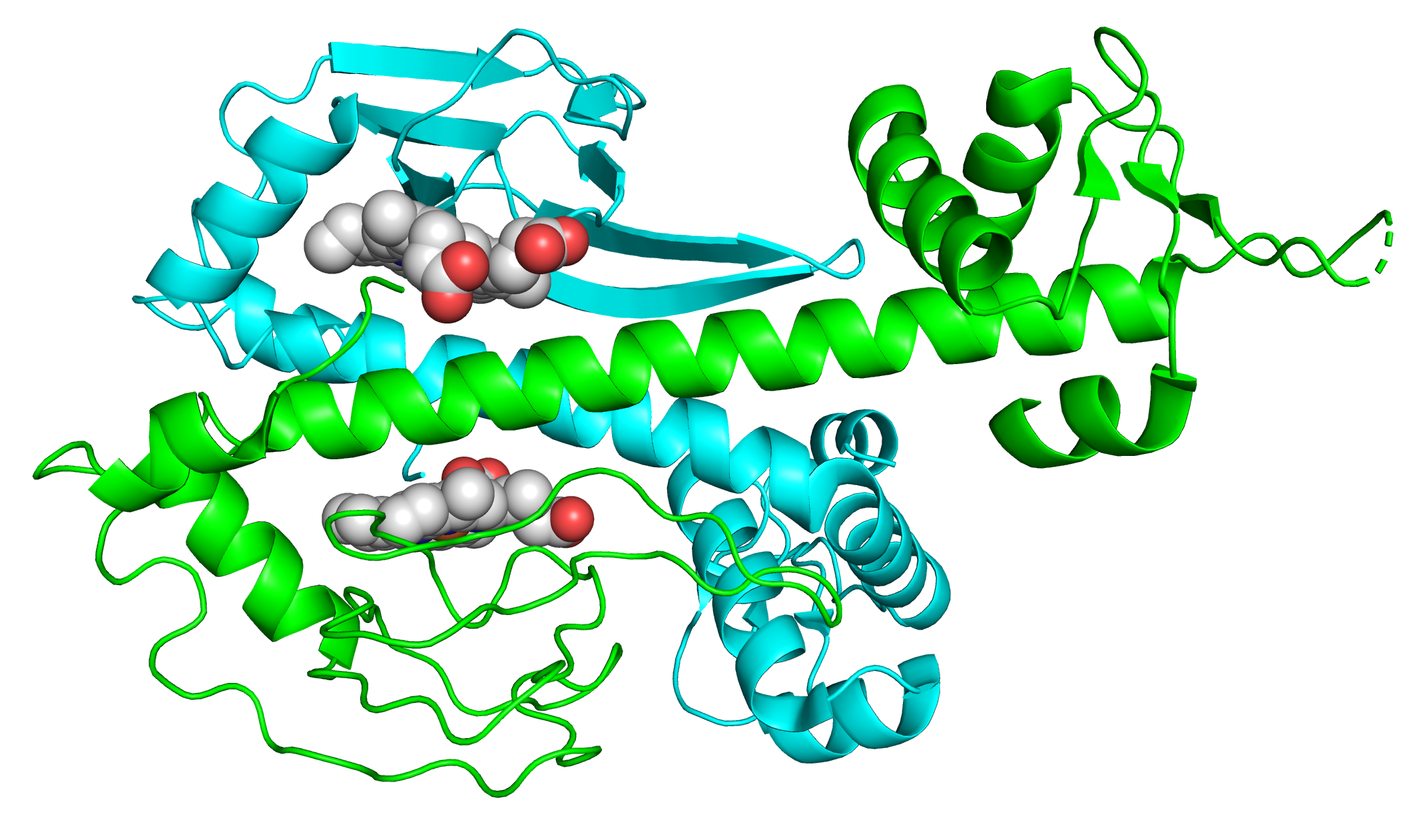
- Crystallographic structure of the homodimeric RRcOOA (monomers colored cyan and green) bound to heme (spheres)

Identifiers
- Organism: Rhodospirillum rubrum
- Symbol: cooA
- Orthologs: OMA: entry
- PDB: 1FT9
- UniProt: P72322
Search for
- Structures: Swiss-model
- Domains: InterPro

CooA is a heme-containing transcription factor found in bacteria that responds to the presence of carbon monoxide. This protein forms homodimers and is a homolog of cAMP receptor protein.

== Homologs ==
The most well-studied CooA homolog comes from Rhodospirillum rubrum (RrCooA), but the homolog from Carboxydothermus hydrogenoformans (ChCooA) has also been characterized.

The main structural difference between these homologs lies in ferric heme coordination. In RrCooA, the ferric heme iron is ligated by a cysteine and the amine of the N-terminal proline; in the ferrous state, a ligand switch occurs in which a histidine replaces the thiolate. In contrast, ChCooA features histidine and the N-terminal amine as ligands in both ferric and ferrous states.

== Structure ==
CooA is a homodimeric, heme-containing transcription factor of the CAP/CRP family, with each monomer comprising an N-terminal heme-binding regulatory domain and a C-terminal helix-turn-helix motif that acts as a DNA-binding domain. The N-terminal domain coordinates a b-type heme whose axial ligands differ between species (for example, His-Pro versus His-His), and carbon monoxide (CO) binding to this heme triggers conformational changes that activate DNA binding. The two subunits associate through a coiled-coil-like interface, positioning the paired helix–turn–helix motifs to recognize target palindromic sequences in promoter DNA and thereby regulate genes involved in CO oxidation.

Several structures of CooA have been solved, including:

- RrCooA in the ferrous state (1FT9),
- ChCooA in the ferrous, imidazole-bound state (2FMY),
- ChCooA in the ferrous, CO-bound state (2HKX).

== Function ==
CooA responds to the presence of carbon monoxide and regulates the expression of carbon monoxide dehydrogenase, the enzyme that catalyzes the oxidation of CO to CO_{2}.

For both RrCooA and ChCooA, CO displaces the amine ligand at the heme and activates the protein, enabling DNA binding at the target promoter sequence.
