= Carbon monoxide (data page) =

Chemical data page

This page provides supplementary chemical data on carbon monoxide.

== Material safety data sheet ==
The handling of this chemical may incur notable safety precautions. It is highly recommended that you seek the material safety data sheet (MSDS) for this chemical from a reliable source such as SIRI, and follow its directions.

- MSDS from Advanced Gas Technologies in the SDSdata.org database

== Structure and properties ==
Structure and properties
Index of refraction, n_{D}	1.0003364
Abbe number	?
Dielectric constant, ε_{r}	? ε_{0} at ? °C
Bond strength	1850 N/m
Bond length	0.111 nm
Bond energy	1079 kJ/mol
Bond angle	Linear
Magnetic susceptibility	?

== Thermodynamic properties ==
Phase behavior
Triple point	67.9 K (−205.1 °C), 15.35 kPa
Critical point	132.7 K (−140.3 °C), 3498 kPa, 11.1 mol/L (3.1×10^{2} kg/m^{3})
Std enthalpy change of fusion, Δ_{fus}H^{~~o~~}	? kJ/mol
Std entropy change of fusion, Δ_{fus}S^{~~o~~}	? J/(mol K)
Std enthalpy change of vaporization, Δ_{vap}H^{~~o~~}	? kJ/mol
Std entropy change of vaporization, Δ_{vap}S^{~~o~~}	? J/(mol K)
Std enthalpy change of sublimation, Δ_{sub}H^{~~o~~}	8 kJ/mol (at 51–68 K)
Std entropy change of sublimation, Δ_{sub}S^{~~o~~}	? J/(mol·K)
Solid properties
Std enthalpy change of formation, Δ_{f}H^{~~o~~}_{solid}	−110.5 kJ/mol
Standard molar entropy, S^{~~o~~}_{solid}	? J/(mol K)
Heat capacity, c_{p}	? J/(mol K)
Liquid properties
Std enthalpy change of formation, Δ_{f}H^{~~o~~}_{liquid}	? kJ/mol
Standard molar entropy, S^{~~o~~}_{liquid}	? J/(mol K)
Heat capacity, c_{p}	? J/(mol K)
Gas properties
Std enthalpy change of formation, Δ_{f}H^{~~o~~}_{gas}	−110.53 kJ/mol
Std enthalpy change of combustion, Δ_{c}H^{~~o~~}_{gas}	−283.0 kJ/mol
Standard molar entropy, S^{~~o~~}_{gas}	197.66 J/(mol K)
Heat capacity, c_{p}	29 J/(mol K)

== Spectral data ==
UV-Vis
λ_{max}	55 nm
Extinction coefficient, ε	?
IR
Major absorption bands	2143 cm^{−1}
^{13}CO	2099.2 ± 4 cm^{−1}
NMR
Proton NMR
Carbon-13 NMR
Other NMR data
MS
Masses of main fragments
