= Crp domain =

Crp
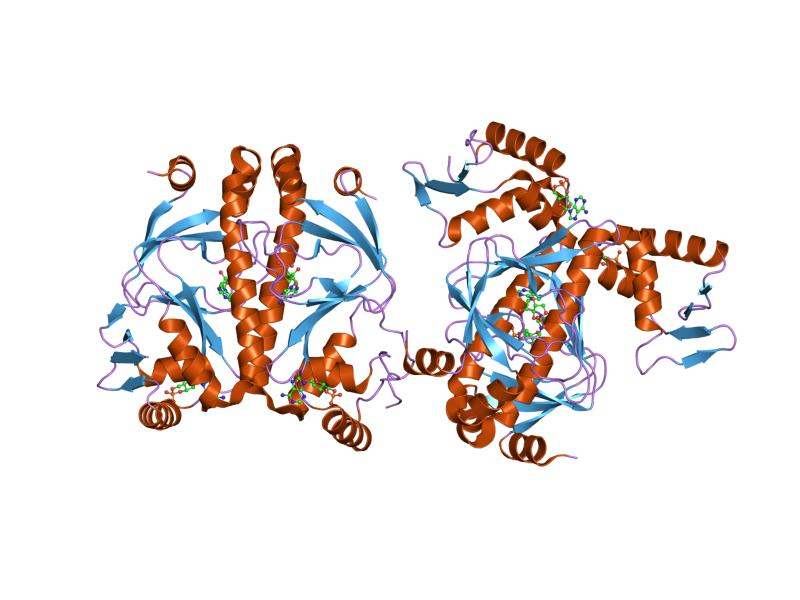
- crystal structure of the e.coli crp-camp complex

Identifiers
- Symbol: Crp
- Pfam: PF00325
- Pfam clan: CL0123
- InterPro: IPR001808
- PROSITE: PDOC00041
- SCOP2: 1cgp / SCOPe / SUPFAM
- CDD: cd00092
Available protein structures:
- PDB: IPR001808 PF00325 (ECOD; PDBsum)
- AlphaFold: IPR001808; PF00325

In molecular biology, the CRP domain is a protein domain consisting of a helix-turn-helix (HTH) motif. It is found at the C-terminus of numerous bacterial transcription regulatory proteins. These proteins bind DNA via the CRP domain. These proteins are very diverse, but for convenience may be grouped into subfamilies on the basis of sequence similarity. This family groups together a range of proteins, including ANR, CRP, CLP, CysR, FixK, Flp, FNR, FnrN, HlyX and NtcA.
