= Carbon monoxide =

Poisonous gas consisting of carbon and oxygen

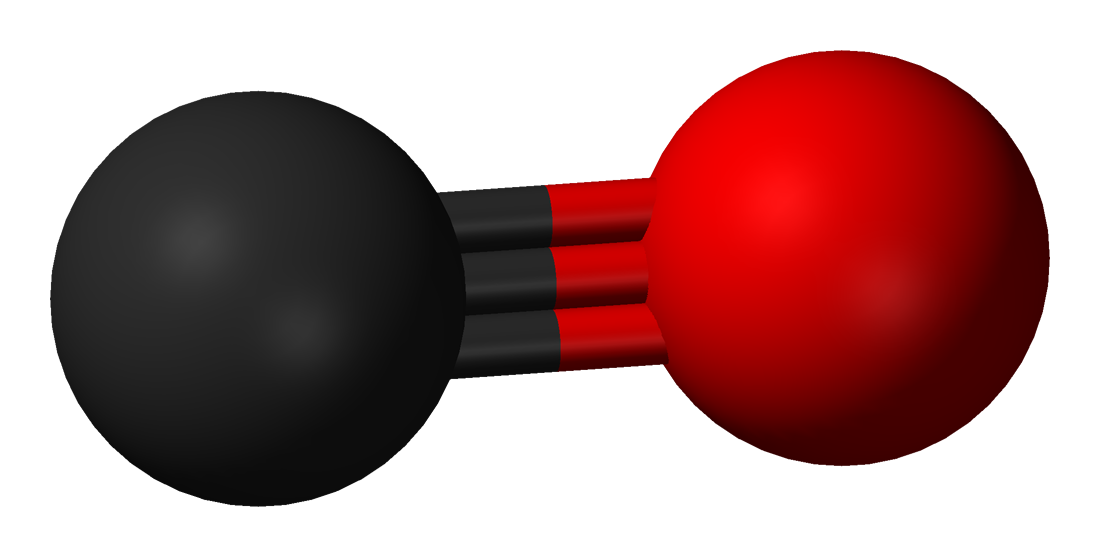
Ball-and-stick model of carbon monoxide
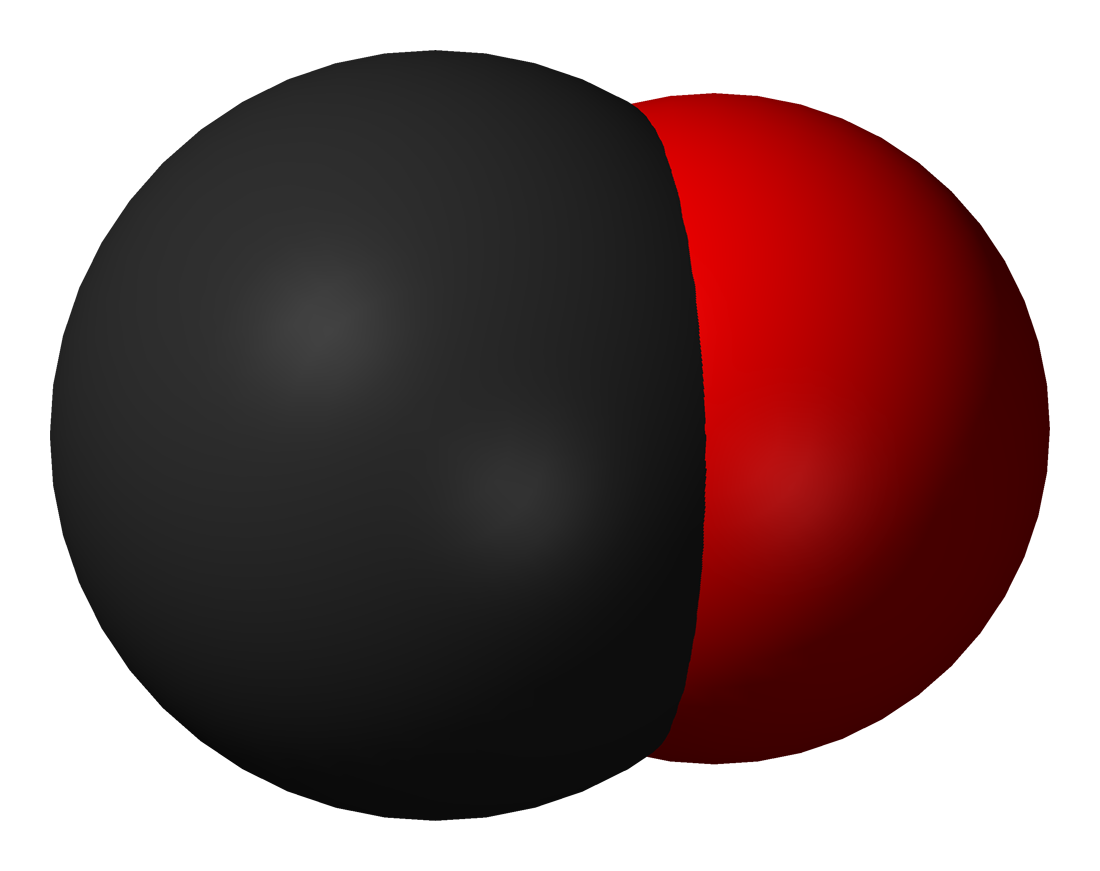
Spamodel of carbon monoxide
- model of carbon monoxide

Names
- IUPAC name Carbon monoxide
- Other names: Carbonic oxide gas; Carbon protoxide; Oxide of carbon; Protoxide of carbon; Carbonous oxide; Carbonous acid gas; Carbon(II) oxide; Breath of carbon; Oxygenated carbon; Carbate; Carbonyl; Water gas; Hydrocarbon gas; Fuel gas; Rauchgas; Carbonic inflammable air; Heavy inflammable air; White damp; Fire Damp; Powder Gas; Illuminating gas; Dowson gas; Mond gas; Power gas; Producer gas; Blast furnace gas; Coal gas; Phlogiston; Car gas

Identifiers
CAS Number	630-08-0
3D model (JSmol)	Interactive image
Beilstein Reference	3587264
ChEBI	CHEBI:17245
ChEMBL	ChEMBL1231840
ChemSpider	275
ECHA InfoCard	100.010.118
EC Number	211-128-3
Gmelin Reference	421
KEGG	D09706
MeSH	Carbon+monoxide
PubChem CID	281
RTECS number	FG3500000
UNII	7U1EE4V452
UN number	1016
CompTox Dashboard (EPA)	DTXSID5027273
- InChI: InChI=1S/CO/c1-2 Key: UGFAIRIUMAVXCW-UHFFFAOYSA-N; InChI=1/CO/c1-2 Key: UGFAIRIUMAVXCW-UHFFFAOYAT
- SMILES: [C-]#[O+]

Properties
Chemical formula	CO
Molar mass	28.010 g·mol^{−1}
Appearance	Colorless
Odor	Odorless
Density	789 kg/m^{3}, liquid; 1.250 kg/m^{3} at 0 °C, 1 atm; 1.145 kg/m^{3} at 25 °C, 1 atm
Melting point	−205.02 °C (−337.04 °F; 68.13 K)
Boiling point	−191.5 °C (−312.7 °F; 81.6 K)
Solubility in water	27.6 mg/L (25 °C)
Solubility	soluble in chloroform, acetic acid, ethyl acetate, ethanol, ammonium hydroxide, benzene
Henry's law constant (k_{H})	1.04 atm·m^{3}/mol
Magnetic susceptibility (χ)	−9.8·10^{−6} cm^{3}/mol
Refractive index (n_{D})	1.0003364
Dipole moment	0.122 D

Thermochemistry
Heat capacity (C)	29.1 J/(K·mol)
Std molar entropy (S^{⦵}_{298})	197.7 J/(K·mol)
Std enthalpy of formation (Δ_{f}H^{⦵}_{298})	−110.5 kJ/mol
Std enthalpy of combustion (Δ_{c}H^{⦵}_{298})	−283.0 kJ/mol

Pharmacology
ATC code	V04CX08 (WHO)

Hazards
- Occupational safety and health (OHS/OSH)
Main hazards	Poisonous by inhalation
- GHS labelling
Pictograms	(GHS02: Flammable) (GHS06: Toxic) (GHS08: Health hazard)
Signal word	Danger
Hazard statements	H220, H331, H360, H372, H420
Precautionary statements	P201, P202, P210, P251, P260, P264, P270, P281, P304+P340, P308+P313, P311, P314, P321, P377, P381, P403, P403+P233, P405, P501
NFPA 704 (fire diamond)	3 4 0
Flash point	−191 °C (−311.8 °F; 82.1 K)
Autoignition temperature	609 °C (1,128 °F; 882 K)
Explosive limits	12.5–74.2%
- Lethal dose or concentration (LD, LC)
LC_{50} (median concentration)	8636 ppm (rat, 15 min); 5207 ppm (rat, 30 min); 1784 ppm (rat, 4 h); 2414 ppm (mouse, 4 h); 5647 ppm (guinea pig, 4 h)
LC_{Lo} (lowest published)	4000 ppm (human, 30 min); 5000 ppm (human, 5 min)
- NIOSH (US health exposure limits)
PEL (Permissible)	TWA 50 ppm (55 mg/m^{3})
REL (Recommended)	TWA 35 ppm (40 mg/m^{3}); C 200 ppm (229 mg/m^{3})
IDLH (Immediate danger)	1200 ppm
Safety data sheet (SDS)	ICSC 0023

Related compounds
Other anions	Carbon monosulfide
Other cations	Silicon monoxide Germanium monoxide Tin(II) oxide Lead(II) oxide
Related carbon oxides	Carbon dioxide Carbon suboxide Oxocarbons

Supplementary data page
- Carbon monoxide (data page)
- Except where otherwise noted, data are given for materials in their standard state (at 25 °C [77 °F], 100 kPa). verify (what is ?) Infobox references

Carbon monoxide (chemical formula CO) is a poisonous, flammable gas that is colorless, odorless, flavorless, and slightly less dense than air. Carbon monoxide consists of one carbon atom and one oxygen atom connected by a triple bond. It is the simplest carbon oxide. In coordination complexes, the carbon monoxide ligand is called carbonyl. It is a key ingredient in many processes in industrial chemistry.

The most common source of carbon monoxide is the partial combustion of carbon-containing compounds. Numerous environmental and biological sources generate carbon monoxide. In industry, carbon monoxide is important in the production of many compounds, including drugs, fragrances, and fuels.

CO is one of the most acutely toxic contaminants affecting indoor air quality. CO may be emitted from tobacco smoke and generated from malfunctioning fuel-burning stoves (wood, kerosene, natural gas, propane) and fuel-burning heating systems (wood, oil, natural gas) and from blocked flues connected to these appliances. Carbon monoxide poisoning is the most common type of fatal air poisoning in many countries.

Carbon monoxide has important biological roles across biological kingdoms. It is produced by many organisms, including humans. In mammalian physiology, carbon monoxide is a classical example of hormesis where low concentrations serve as an endogenous neurotransmitter (gasotransmitter) and high concentrations are toxic, resulting in carbon monoxide poisoning. It is isoelectronic with both cyanide anion CN^{−} and molecular nitrogen N_{2}.

== Physical and chemical properties ==
Carbon monoxide is the simplest oxocarbon and is isoelectronic with other triply bonded diatomic species possessing 10 valence electrons, including the cyanide anion, the nitrosonium cation, boron monofluoride and molecular nitrogen. It has a molar mass of 28.0, which, according to the ideal gas law, makes it slightly less dense than air, whose average molar mass is 28.8.

The carbon and oxygen are connected by a triple bond that consists of a net two pi bonds and one sigma bond. The bond length between the carbon atom and the oxygen atom is 112.8 pm. This bond length is consistent with a triple bond, as in molecular nitrogen (N_{2}), which has a similar bond length (109.76 pm) and nearly the same molecular mass. Carbon–oxygen double bonds are significantly longer, 120.8 pm in formaldehyde, for example. The boiling point (82 K) and melting point (68 K) are very similar to those of N_{2} (77 K and 63 K, respectively). The bond-dissociation energy of 1072 kJ/mol is stronger than that of N_{2} (942 kJ/mol) and represents the strongest chemical bond known.

The ground electronic state of carbon monoxide is a singlet state, since there are no unpaired electrons.

Liquid carbon monoxide

Thermal and physical properties of carbon monoxide (CO) at atmospheric pressure
Temperature (°C)	Temperature (K)	Density (kg/m^{3})	Specific heat (J/g °C)	Dynamic viscosity (cg/m s)	Kinematic viscosity (cm^{2}/s)	Thermal conductivity (cW/m °C)	Thermal diffusivity (cm^{2}/s)	Prandtl number
−73.15	200	1.6888	1.045	1.27	0.0752	1.7	0.0963	0.781
−53.15	220	1.5341	1.044	1.37	0.0893	1.9	0.119	0.753
−33.15	240	1.4055	1.043	1.47	0.105	2.06	0.141	0.744
−13.15	260	1.2967	1.043	1.57	0.121	2.21	0.163	0.741
6.85	280	1.2038	1.042	1.66	0.138	2.36	0.188	0.733
26.85	300	1.1233	1.043	1.75	0.156	2.5	0.213	0.73
46.85	320	1.0529	1.043	1.84	0.175	2.63	0.239	0.73
66.85	340	0.9909	1.044	1.93	0.195	2.78	0.269	0.725
86.85	360	0.9357	1.045	2.02	0.216	2.91	0.298	0.725
106.85	380	0.8864	1.047	2.1	0.237	3.05	0.329	0.729
126.85	400	0.8421	1.049	2.18	0.259	3.18	0.36	0.719
176.85	450	0.7483	1.055	2.37	0.317	3.5	0.443	0.714
226.85	500	0.67352	1.065	2.54	0.377	3.81	0.531	0.71
276.85	550	0.61226	1.076	2.71	0.443	4.11	0.624	0.71
326.85	600	0.56126	1.088	2.86	0.51	4.4	0.721	0.707
376.85	650	0.51806	1.101	3.01	0.581	4.7	0.824	0.705
426.85	700	0.48102	1.114	3.15	0.655	5	0.933	0.702
476.85	750	0.44899	1.127	3.29	0.733	5.28	1.04	0.702
526.85	800	0.42095	1.14	3.43	0.815	5.55	1.16	0.705

=== Bonding and dipole moment ===
The strength of the C≡O bond in carbon monoxide is indicated by the high frequency of its vibration, 2143 cm^{−1}. For comparison, organic carbonyls such as ketones and esters absorb at around 1700 cm^{−1}.

Carbon and oxygen together have a total of 10 electrons in the valence shell. Following the octet rule for both carbon and oxygen, the two atoms form a triple bond, with six shared electrons in three bonding molecular orbitals, rather than the usual double bond found in organic carbonyl compounds, and one lone pair on each atom. This structure results in a negative charge on the carbon and a positive charge on the nitrogen. An alternative resonance structure that has both atoms charge-neutral, with two lone-pairs on oxygen and one on carbon, gives an unsatisfied octet on carbon. The molecule is therefore asymmetric: oxygen is more electron dense than carbon and is also slightly positively charged, unlike the negative carbon.

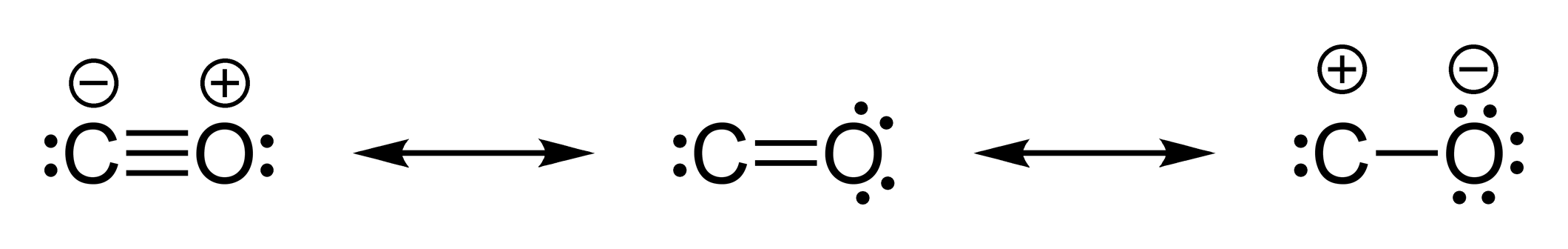
The most important resonance form of carbon monoxide is ^{−}C≡O^{+}. An important minor resonance contributor is the non-octet carbenic structure :C=O.

In the free carbon monoxide molecule, a net negative charge δ^{−} remains at the carbon end and the molecule has a small dipole moment of 0.122 D. Carbon monoxide has a computed fractional bond order of 2.6, indicating that the "third" bond is important but constitutes somewhat less than a full bond. Thus, in valence bond terms, ^{−}C≡O^{+} is the most important structure, while :C=O is non-octet, but has a neutral formal charge on each atom and represents the second most important resonance contributor. Because of the lone pair and divalence of carbon in this resonance structure, carbon monoxide is often considered to be an extraordinarily stabilized carbene. Isocyanides are compounds in which the O is replaced by an NR (R = alkyl or aryl) group and have a similar bonding scheme.

If carbon monoxide acts as a ligand, the polarity of the dipole may reverse with a net negative charge on the oxygen end, depending on the structure of the coordination complex. See also the section "Coordination chemistry" below.

=== Bond polarity and oxidation state ===
Theoretical and experimental studies show that, despite the greater electronegativity of oxygen, the dipole moment points from the more-negative carbon end to the more-positive oxygen end. The three bonds are in fact polar covalent bonds that are strongly polarized. The calculated polarization toward the oxygen atom is 71% for the σ-bond and 77% for both π-bonds.

The oxidation state of carbon in carbon monoxide is +2 in each of these structures. It is calculated by counting all the bonding electrons as belonging to the more electronegative oxygen. Only the two non-bonding electrons on carbon are assigned to carbon. In this count, carbon then has only two valence electrons in the molecule, versus four in the free atom.

== Occurrence ==
Monthly averages of global concentrations of tropospheric carbon monoxide at an altitude of about 12,000 feet. Data were collected by the MOPITT (Measurements Of Pollution In The Troposphere) sensor on NASA's Terra satellite.

Carbon monoxide occurs in many environments, usually in trace levels. Photochemical degradation of plant matter, for example, generates an estimated 60 million tons/year. Typical concentrations in parts per million are as follows:

Composition of dry atmosphere, by volume
Concentration (ppmv (Note: Parts per million by volume (note: volume fraction is equal to mole fraction for ideal gas only, see volume (thermodynamics))))	Source
0.1	Natural atmosphere level (MOPITT)
0.5–5	Average level in homes
5–15	Near properly adjusted gas stoves in homes, modern vehicle exhaust emissions
17	Atmosphere of Venus
100–200	Exhaust from automobiles in the Mexico City central area in 1975
700	Atmosphere of Mars
<1,000	Car exhaust fumes after passing through catalytic converter
5,000	Exhaust from a home wood fire
30,000–100,000	Undiluted warm car exhaust without a catalytic converter

=== Atmospheric presence ===
The streak of red, orange, and yellow across South America, Africa, and the Atlantic Ocean in this animation points to high levels of carbon monoxide on September 30, 2005.

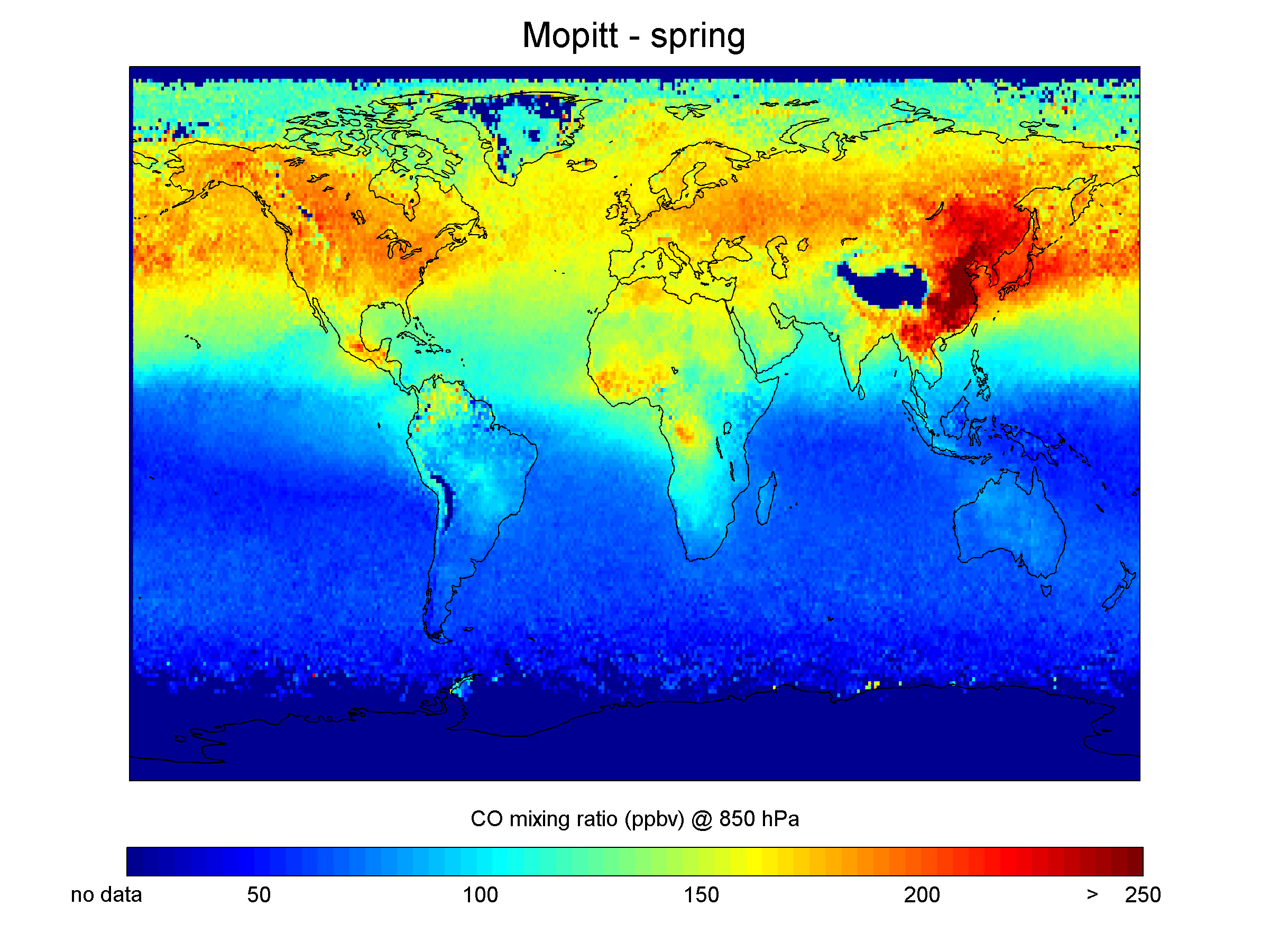
Carbon monoxide concentrations in Northern Hemisphere spring as measured with the MOPITT instrument

Carbon monoxide (CO) is present in small amounts (about 80 ppb) in the Earth's atmosphere. Most comes from chemical reactions with organic compounds emitted by human activities and natural origins due to photochemical reactions in the troposphere that generate about 5 × 10^{12} kilograms per year. Other natural sources of CO include volcanoes, forest and bushfires, and other miscellaneous forms of combustion such as fossil fuels. Small amounts are also emitted from the ocean, and from geological activity because carbon monoxide occurs dissolved in molten volcanic rock at high pressures in the Earth's mantle. Because natural sources of carbon monoxide vary from year to year, it is difficult to accurately measure natural emissions of the gas.

Carbon monoxide has an indirect effect on radiative forcing by elevating concentrations of direct greenhouse gases, including methane and tropospheric ozone. CO can react chemically with other atmospheric constituents (primarily the hydroxyl radical, ^{•}OH) that would otherwise destroy methane. Through natural processes in the atmosphere, it is oxidized to carbon dioxide and ozone. Carbon monoxide is short-lived in the atmosphere (with an average lifetime of about one to two months), and spatially variable in concentration.

Due to its long lifetime in the mid-troposphere, carbon monoxide is also used as a tracer for pollutant plumes.

=== Astronomy ===
Beyond Earth, carbon monoxide is the second-most common diatomic molecule in the interstellar medium, after molecular hydrogen. Because of its asymmetry, this polar molecule produces far brighter spectral lines than the hydrogen molecule, making CO much easier to detect. Interstellar CO was first detected with radio telescopes in 1970. It is now the most commonly used tracer of molecular gas in general in the interstellar medium of galaxies, as molecular hydrogen can only be detected using ultraviolet light, which requires space telescopes. Carbon monoxide observations provide much of the information about the molecular clouds in which most stars form.

Beta Pictoris, the second brightest star in the constellation Pictor, shows an excess of infrared emission compared to normal stars of its type, which is caused by large quantities of dust and gas (including carbon monoxide) near the star.

In the atmosphere of Venus carbon monoxide occurs as a result of the photodissociation of carbon dioxide by electromagnetic radiation of wavelengths shorter than 169 nm. It has also been identified spectroscopically on the surface of Neptune's moon Triton.

Solid carbon monoxide is a component of comets. The volatile or "ice" component of Halley's Comet is about 15% CO. At room temperature and at normal atmospheric pressure, carbon monoxide is merely metastable (see Boudouard reaction) and the same is true at low temperatures where CO and CO_{2} are solid, but nevertheless it can exist for billions of years in comets. There is very little CO in the atmosphere of Pluto, which seems to have been formed from comets. This may be because there is (or was) liquid water inside Pluto.

Carbon monoxide can react with water to form carbon dioxide and hydrogen:

CO + H_{2}O → H_{2} + CO_{2}

This is called the water-gas shift reaction when occurring in the gas phase, but it can also take place (very slowly) in an aqueous solution. If the hydrogen partial pressure is high enough (for instance in an underground sea), formic acid will be formed:

CO + H_{2}O → HCOOH

These reactions can take place in a few million years even at temperatures such as found on Pluto.

== Pollution and health effects ==
=== Urban pollution ===
Carbon monoxide is a temporary atmospheric pollutant in some urban areas, chiefly from the exhaust of internal combustion engines (vehicles, portable and back-up generators, lawnmowers, power washers, etc.), but also from incomplete combustion of various other fuels (including wood, coal, charcoal, oil, paraffin, propane, natural gas, and trash).

Large CO pollution events can be observed from space over cities.

==== Role in ground level ozone formation ====
Along with aldehydes, carbon monoxide is part of the series of cycles of chemical reactions that form photochemical smog. It reacts with hydroxyl radical (^{•}OH) to produce a radical intermediate ^{•}HOCO, which rapidly transfers its radical hydrogen to O_{2} to form peroxy radical (HO_{2}^{•}) and carbon dioxide (CO_{2}). Peroxy radical subsequently reacts with nitrogen oxide (NO) to form nitrogen dioxide (NO_{2}) and hydroxyl radical. NO_{2} gives O(^{3}P) via photolysis, thereby forming O_{3} following reaction with O_{2}. Since hydroxyl radical is formed during the formation of NO_{2}, the balance of the sequence of chemical reactions starting with carbon monoxide and leading to the formation of ozone is:

CO + 2 O_{2} + hν → CO_{2} + O_{3}

(where hν refers to the photon of light absorbed by the NO_{2} molecule in the sequence)

Although the creation of NO_{2} is the critical step leading to low-level ozone formation, it also increases this ozone in another, somewhat mutually exclusive way, by reducing the quantity of NO that is available to react with ozone.

=== Indoor air pollution ===
Carbon monoxide is one of the most acutely toxic indoor air contaminants. Carbon monoxide may be emitted from tobacco smoke and generated from malfunctioning fuel burning stoves (wood, kerosene, natural gas, propane) and fuel burning heating systems (wood, oil, natural gas) and from blocked flues connected to these appliances. In developed countries, the main sources of indoor CO emission come from cooking and heating devices that burn fossil fuels and are faulty, incorrectly installed, or poorly maintained. Appliance malfunction may be due to faulty installation or lack of maintenance and proper use. In low- and middle-income countries the most common sources of CO in homes are burning biomass fuels and cigarette smoke.

==== Mining ====
Miners refer to carbon monoxide as "whitedamp" or the "silent killer". It can be found in confined areas of poor ventilation in both surface mines and underground mines. The most common sources of carbon monoxide in mining operations are the internal combustion engine and explosives; however, in coal mines, carbon monoxide can also be found due to the low-temperature oxidation of coal. The idiom "Canary in the coal mine" pertained to an early warning of a carbon monoxide presence.

=== Health effects ===
Carbon monoxide poisoning is the most common type of fatal air poisoning in many countries. Acute exposure can also lead to long-term neurological effects such as cognitive and behavioural changes. Severe CO poisoning may lead to unconsciousness, coma, and death. Chronic exposure to low concentrations of carbon monoxide may lead to lethargy, headaches, nausea, flu-like symptoms, and neuropsychological and cardiovascular issues.

== Chemistry ==
Carbon monoxide has a wide range of functions across all disciplines of chemistry. The four premier categories of reactivity involve metal-carbonyl catalysis, radical chemistry, cation and anion chemistries.

=== Coordination chemistry ===
Energy level scheme of the σ and π orbitals of carbon monoxide

The HOMO of CO is a σ MO.

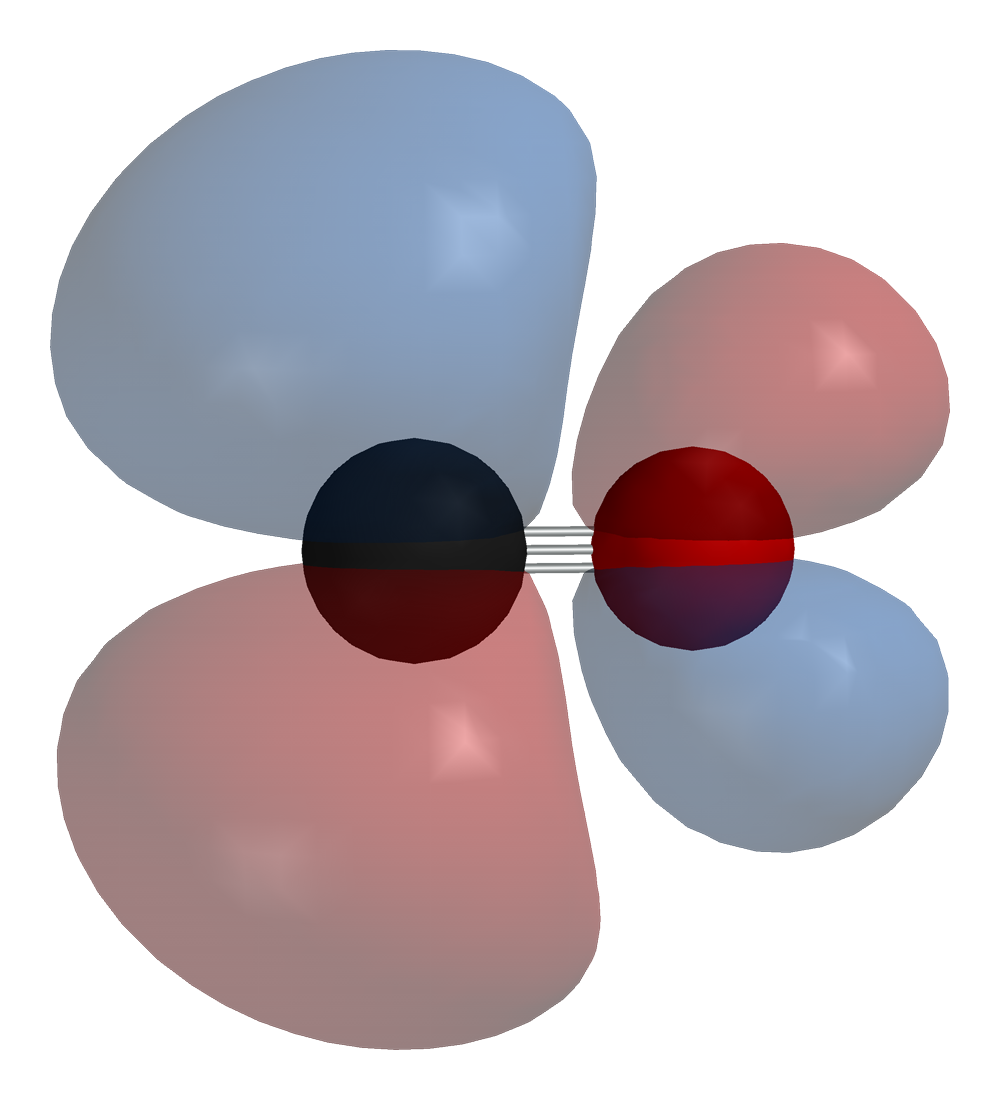
The LUMO of CO is a π* antibonding MO.

Most metals form coordination complexes containing covalently attached carbon monoxide. These derivatives, called metal carbonyls, tend to be more robust when the metal is in lower oxidation states. For example, iron pentacarbonyl (Fe(CO)_{5}) is an air-stable, distillable liquid. Nickel carbonyl is a metal carbonyl complex that forms by the direct combination of carbon monoxide with the metal:

Ni + 4 CO → Ni(CO)_{4} (1 bar, 55 °C)

These volatile complexes are often highly toxic. Some metal–CO complexes are prepared by decarbonylation of organic solvents, not from CO. For instance, iridium trichloride and triphenylphosphine react in boiling 2-methoxyethanol or DMF to afford IrCl(CO)(PPh_{3})_{2}.

As a ligand, CO binds through carbon, forming a kind of triple bond. The lone pair on the carbon atom donates electron density to form a M-CO sigma bond. The two π* orbitals on CO bind to filled metal orbitals. The effect is related to the Dewar-Chatt-Duncanson model. The effects of the quasi-triple M-C bond is reflected in the infrared spectrum of these complexes. Whereas free CO vibrates at 2143 cm^{−1}, its complexes tend to absorb near 1950 cm^{−1}.

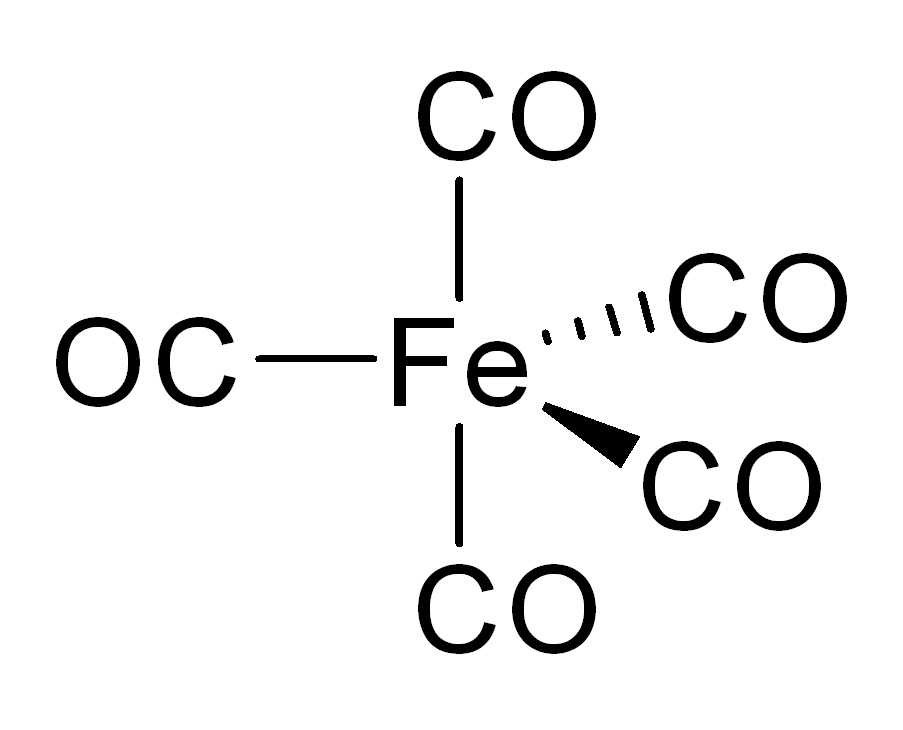

=== Organic and main group chemistry ===
In the presence of strong acids, alkenes react with carboxylic acids. Hydrolysis of this species (an acylium ion) gives the carboxylic acid, a net process known as the Koch–Haaf reaction. In the Gattermann–Koch reaction, arenes are converted to benzaldehyde derivatives in the presence of CO, AlCl_{3}, and HCl.

A mixture of hydrogen gas and CO reacts with alkenes to give aldehydes. The process requires the presence of metal catalysts.

With main group reagents, CO undergoes several noteworthy reactions. Chlorination of CO is the industrial route to the important compound phosgene. With borane CO forms the adduct H_{3}BCO, which is isoelectronic with the acylium cation [H_{3}CCO]^{+}. CO reacts with sodium to give products resulting from C−C coupling such as sodium acetylenediolate 2Na^{+}·C_{2}O^{2−}_{2}. It reacts with molten potassium to give a mixture of an organometallic compound, potassium acetylenediolate 2K^{+}·C_{2}O^{2−}_{2}, potassium benzenehexolate 6K^{+}·C_{6}O^{6−}_{6}, and potassium rhodizonate 2K^{+}·C_{6}O^{2−}_{6}.

The compounds cyclohexanehexone or triquinoyl (C_{6}O_{6}) and cyclopentanepentone or leuconic acid (C_{5}O_{5}), which so far have been obtained only in trace amounts, can be regarded as polymers of carbon monoxide. At pressures exceeding 5 GPa, carbon monoxide converts to polycarbonyl, a solid polymer that is metastable at atmospheric pressure but is explosive.

==== Laboratory preparation ====
Carbon monoxide is conveniently produced in the laboratory by the dehydration of formic acid or oxalic acid, for example with concentrated sulfuric acid. Another method is heating an intimate mixture of powdered zinc metal and calcium carbonate, which releases CO and leaves behind zinc oxide and calcium oxide:

Zn + CaCO_{3} → ZnO + CaO + CO

Silver nitrate and iodoform also afford carbon monoxide:

CHI_{3} + 3 AgNO_{3} + H_{2}O → 3 HNO_{3} + CO + 3 AgI

Finally, metal oxalate salts release CO upon heating, leaving a carbonate as byproduct:

Na_{2}C_{2}O_{4} → Na_{2}CO_{3} + CO

== Production ==
Thermal combustion is the most common source for carbon monoxide. Carbon monoxide is produced from the partial oxidation of carbon-containing compounds; it forms when there is too little oxygen to produce carbon dioxide (CO_{2}), such as in an internal combustion engine operating with an air-fuel mixture richer than chemically correct, or when operating a fuel-burning stove in an enclosed space.

Many methods have been developed for carbon monoxide production.

=== Industrial production ===
A major industrial source of CO is producer gas, a mixture containing mostly carbon monoxide and nitrogen, formed by combustion of carbon in air at high temperature when there is an excess of carbon. In an oven, air is passed through a bed of coke. The initially produced CO_{2} equilibrates with the remaining hot carbon to give CO. The reaction of CO_{2} with carbon to give CO is described as the Boudouard reaction. Above 800 °C, CO is the predominant product:

CO_{2} (g) + C (s) → 2 CO (g) (ΔH_{r} = 170 kJ/mol)

Another source is "water gas", a mixture of hydrogen and carbon monoxide produced via the endothermic reaction of steam and carbon:

H_{2}O (g) + C (s) → H_{2} (g) + CO (g) (ΔH_{r} = 131 kJ/mol)

Other similar "synthesis gases" can be obtained from natural gas and other fuels.

Carbon monoxide can also be produced by high-temperature electrolysis of carbon dioxide with solid oxide electrolyzer cells. One method developed at DTU Energy uses a cerium oxide catalyst and does not have any issues of fouling of the catalyst.

2 CO_{2} → 2 CO + O_{2}

Carbon monoxide is also a byproduct of the reduction of metal oxide ores with carbon, shown in a simplified form as follows:

MO + C → M + CO

Carbon monoxide is also produced by the direct oxidation of carbon in a limited supply of oxygen or air.

2 C + O_{2} → 2 CO

Since CO is a gas, the reduction process can be driven by heating, exploiting the positive (favorable) entropy of reaction. The Ellingham diagram shows that CO formation is favored over CO_{2} in high temperatures.

== Use ==
=== Chemical industry ===
Carbon monoxide is an industrial gas with many applications in bulk chemicals manufacturing. Large quantities of aldehydes are produced by the hydroformylation reaction of alkenes, carbon monoxide, and H_{2}. Hydroformylation is coupled to the Shell higher olefin process to give precursors to detergents.

Phosgene, useful for preparing isocyanates, polycarbonates, and polyurethanes, is produced by passing purified carbon monoxide and chlorine gas through a bed of porous activated carbon, which serves as a catalyst. World production of this compound was estimated to be 2.74 million tonnes in 1989.

CO + Cl_{2} → COCl_{2}

Methanol is produced by the hydrogenation of carbon monoxide. In a related reaction, the hydrogenation of carbon monoxide is coupled to C−C bond formation, as in the Fischer–Tropsch process where carbon monoxide is hydrogenated to liquid hydrocarbon fuels. This technology allows coal or biomass to be converted to diesel.

In the Cativa process, carbon monoxide and methanol react in the presence of a homogeneous iridium catalyst and hydroiodic acid to give acetic acid. This process is responsible for most of the industrial production of acetic acid.

=== Metallurgy ===
Carbon monoxide is a strong reductive agent and has been used in pyrometallurgy to reduce metals from ores since ancient times. Carbon monoxide strips oxygen off metal oxides, reducing them to pure metal in high temperatures and forming carbon dioxide in the process. Carbon monoxide is not usually supplied as is, in the gaseous phase, in the reactor, but rather it is formed in high temperature in presence of oxygen-carrying ore, or a carboniferous agent such as coke, and high temperature. The blast furnace process is a typical example of a process of reduction of metal from ore with carbon monoxide.

Likewise, blast furnace gas collected at the top of blast furnaces still contains some 10% to 30% of carbon monoxide, and is used as fuel on Cowper stoves and on Siemens-Martin furnaces on open hearth steelmaking.

=== Proposed use as a rocket fuel ===
Carbon monoxide has been proposed for use as a fuel on Mars by NASA researcher Geoffrey Landis. Carbon monoxide/oxygen engines have been suggested for early surface transportation use as both carbon monoxide and oxygen can be straightforwardly produced from the carbon dioxide atmosphere of Mars by zirconia electrolysis, without using any Martian water resources to obtain hydrogen, which would be needed to make methane or any hydrogen-based fuel.

Landis also proposed manufacturing the fuel from the similar carbon dioxide atmosphere of Venus for a sample return mission, in combination with solar-powered UAVs and rocket balloon ascent.

=== Electrochemistry ===
Carbon monoxide is used in electrochemistry to study the structure of electrodes thanks to its strong affinity to some metals used as electrocatalysts, through a technique known as CO stripping.

== Biological and physiological properties ==
=== Physiology ===
Carbon monoxide is a bioactive molecule which acts as a gaseous signaling molecule. It is naturally produced by many enzymatic and non-enzymatic pathways, the best understood of which is the catabolic action of heme oxygenase on the heme derived from hemoproteins such as hemoglobin. Following the first report that carbon monoxide is a normal neurotransmitter in 1993, carbon monoxide has received significant clinical attention as a biological regulator.

Because of carbon monoxide's role in the body, abnormalities in its metabolism have been linked to a variety of diseases, including neurodegenerations, hypertension, heart failure, and pathological inflammation. In many tissues, carbon monoxide acts as anti-inflammatory, vasodilatory, and encouragers of neovascular growth. In animal model studies, carbon monoxide reduced the severity of experimentally induced bacterial sepsis, pancreatitis, hepatic ischemia/reperfusion injury, colitis, osteoarthritis, lung injury, lung transplantation rejection, and neuropathic pain while promoting skin wound healing. Therefore, there is significant interest in the therapeutic potential of carbon monoxide becoming pharmaceutical agent and clinical standard of care.

==== Medicine ====
Many laboratories worldwide have studied carbon monoxide for its anti-inflammatory and cytoprotective properties. These properties might be usable for preventing the development of a series of pathological conditions including ischemia reperfusion injury, transplant rejection, atherosclerosis, severe sepsis, severe malaria, or autoimmunity. Many pharmaceutical drug delivery initiatives have developed methods to safely administer carbon monoxide, and subsequent controlled clinical trials have evaluated the therapeutic effect of carbon monoxide.

=== Microbiology ===
Microbiota may also utilize carbon monoxide as a gasotransmitter. Carbon monoxide sensing is a signaling pathway facilitated by proteins such as CooA. The scope of the biological roles for carbon monoxide sensing is still unknown.

The human microbiome produces, consumes, and responds to carbon monoxide. For example, in certain bacteria, carbon monoxide is produced via the reduction of carbon dioxide by the enzyme carbon monoxide dehydrogenase with favorable bioenergetics to power downstream cellular operations. In another example, carbon monoxide is a nutrient for methanogenic archaea which reduce it to methane using hydrogen.

Carbon monoxide has certain antimicrobial properties which have been studied to treat against infectious diseases.

==== Food science ====
Carbon monoxide is used in modified atmosphere packaging systems in the US, mainly with fresh meat products such as beef, pork, and fish to keep them looking fresh. The benefit is two-fold: carbon monoxide protects against microbial spoilage and enhances the meat color for consumer appeal. The carbon monoxide combines with myoglobin to form carboxymyoglobin, a bright-cherry-red pigment. Carboxymyoglobin is more stable than the oxygenated form of myoglobin, oxymyoglobin, which can become oxidized to the brown pigment metmyoglobin. This stable red color can persist much longer than in normally packaged meat. Typical levels of carbon monoxide used in the facilities that use this process are between 0.4% and 0.5%.

The technology was first given "generally recognized as safe" (GRAS) status by the U.S. Food and Drug Administration (FDA) in 2002 for use as a secondary packaging system, and requires no labeling. In 2004, the FDA approved CO as primary packaging method, declaring that CO does not mask spoilage odor. The process is currently unauthorized in many other countries, including Japan, Singapore, and the European Union.

=== Weaponization ===
In ancient history, Hannibal executed Roman prisoners with coal fumes during the Second Punic War.

Carbon monoxide was used for genocide during the Holocaust at some extermination camps, the most notable by gas vans in Chełmno, and in the Action T4 "euthanasia" program.

== History ==
=== Prehistory ===
Man has maintained a complex relationship with carbon monoxide since first learning to control fire circa 800,000 BC. Early man probably discovered the toxicity of carbon monoxide poisoning upon introducing fire into his dwellings. The early development of metallurgy and smelting technologies emerging circa 6,000 BC through the Bronze Age likewise plagued man from carbon monoxide exposure. Apart from the toxicity of carbon monoxide, Native Americans in the United States may have experienced the neuroactive properties of carbon monoxide through shamanistic fireside rituals.

=== Ancient history ===
Early civilizations developed mythological tales to explain the origin of fire, such as Prometheus from Greek mythology who shared fire with humans. Aristotle (384–322 BC) first recorded that burning coals produced toxic fumes. Greek physician Galen (AD 129–199) speculated that there was a change in the composition of the air that caused harm when inhaled, and many others of the era developed a basis of knowledge about carbon monoxide in the context of coal fume toxicity. Cleopatra may have died from carbon monoxide poisoning.

=== Pre–industrial revolution ===
In 1697, Georg Ernst Stahl used carbonarii halitus to refer to toxic vapors thought to be carbon monoxide. Friedrich Hoffmann conducted the first modern scientific investigation into carbon monoxide poisoning from coal in 1716. Herman Boerhaave conducted the first scientific experiments on the effect of carbon monoxide (coal fumes) on animals in the 1730s.

Joseph Priestley is considered to have first synthesized carbon monoxide in 1772. Carl Wilhelm Scheele similarly isolated carbon monoxide from charcoal in 1773 and thought it could be the carbonic entity making fumes toxic. Torbern Bergman isolated carbon monoxide from oxalic acid in 1775. One year later, the French chemist de Lassone produced CO by heating zinc oxide with coke, but mistakenly identified the gaseous product as hydrogen, as it burned with a blue flame. In the presence of oxygen, including atmospheric concentrations, carbon monoxide burns with a blue flame, producing carbon dioxide. Antoine Lavoisier conducted similarly inconclusive experiments in 1777. The gas was identified as a compound containing carbon and oxygen by William Cruickshank in 1800.

Thomas Beddoes and James Watt recognized carbon monoxide (as hydrocarbonate) to brighten venous blood in 1793. Watt suggested coal fumes could act as an antidote to the oxygen in blood, and Beddoes and Watt likewise suggested hydrocarbonate has a greater affinity for animal fiber than oxygen in 1796. In 1854, Adrien Chenot similarly suggested carbon monoxide to remove the oxygen from blood and then be oxidized by the body to carbon dioxide. The mechanism for carbon monoxide poisoning is widely credited to Claude Bernard whose memoirs beginning in 1846 and published in 1857 phrased, "prevents arterials blood from becoming venous". Felix Hoppe-Seyler independently published similar conclusions in the following year.

=== Advent of industrial chemistry ===
Carbon monoxide gained recognition as an essential reagent in the 1900s. Three industrial processes illustrate its evolution in industry. In the Fischer–Tropsch process, coal and related carbon-rich feedstocks are converted into liquid fuels via the intermediacy of CO. Developed as part of the German war effort to compensate for their lack of domestic petroleum, this technology continues today. Also in Germany, a mixture of CO and hydrogen was found to combine with olefins to give aldehydes. This process, called hydroformylation, is used to produce many large scale chemicals such as surfactants as well as specialty compounds that are popular fragrances and drugs. For example, CO is used in the production of vitamin A. In a third major process, attributed to researchers at Monsanto, CO combines with methanol to give acetic acid. Most acetic acid is produced by the Cativa process. Hydroformylation and the acetic acid syntheses are two of myriad carbonylation processes.

== See also ==
- Breath carbon monoxide – Level of carbon monoxide in exhaled breath
- Carbon monoxide (data page) – Chemical data page
- Carbon monoxide detector – Device that measures carbon monoxide (CO)
- Criteria air pollutants – US EPA limits on certain air pollutants
- List of highly toxic gases
