= Sawsan Chebli =

German politician

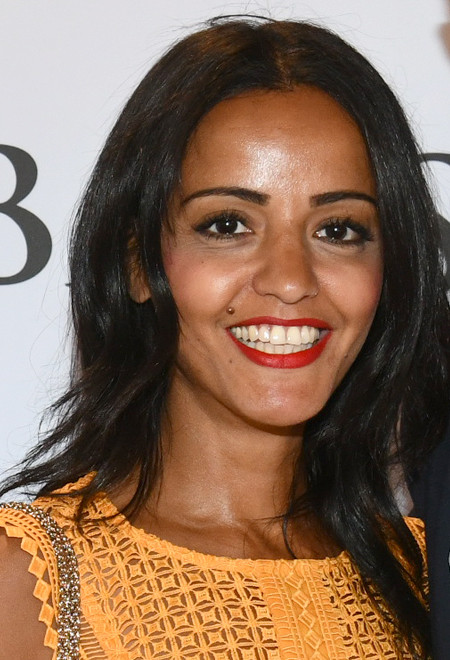
- Chebli in 2019

Berlin State Secretary for Civic and International Affairs
- In office 6 December 2016 – 21 December 2021
- Governing Mayor: Michael Müller
- Preceded by: Hella Dunger-Löper
- Succeeded by: Ana-Maria Trăsnea

Representative of Berlin to the Federation
- In office 6 December 2016 – 21 December 2021
- Governing Mayor: Michael Müller
- Preceded by: Hella Dunger-Löper
- Succeeded by: Ana-Maria Trăsnea

Personal details
- Born: Sawsan Mohammed Chebli; 26 July 1978 (age 48) West Berlin, West Germany
- Party: Social Democratic Party
- Spouse: Nizar Maarouf (m. 2006)
- Children: 1
- Education: Free University of Berlin

Sawsan Mohammed Chebli (born 26 July 1978 in West Berlin, Berlin, West Germany) is a politician of the Social Democratic Party (SPD).

== Early life and education ==
Chebli was born to Palestinian asylum seekers in Germany and grew up with her parents and twelve siblings in Berlin's Moabit district. She was stateless until the age of 15, and her father was expelled from Germany three times and returned illegally each time.

Chebli only started to learn German when she entered school. After completing her Abitur at Lessing-Gymnasium in Wedding, Berlin in 1999, she studied political science at the Otto Suhr Institute (OSI) of the Free University of Berlin.

== Political career ==
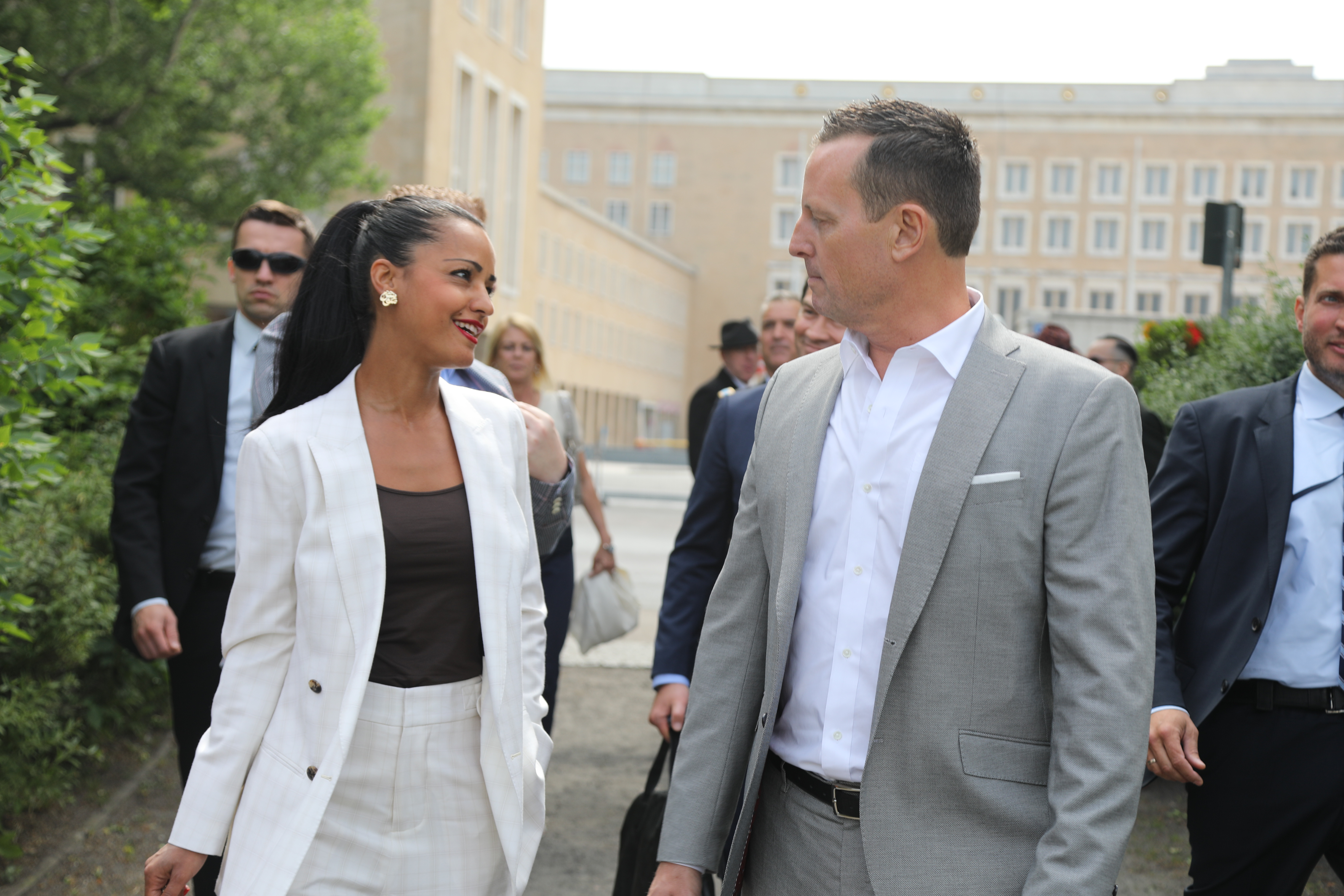
Sawsan Chebli and Ambassador Richard Grenell in 2018

Chebli joined the Social Democratic Party in 2001. During her time at university, she worked as student research assistant to Gert Weisskirchen. From 2004, she served as chief of staff to Johannes Jung.

Between 2010 and 2014, Chebli was the first spokesperson for intercultural affairs of the Berlin's State Minister of the Interior and Sport, Ehrhart Körting, in the state government of the Governing Mayor of Berlin Klaus Wowereit. From January 2014, she served as deputy spokesperson of the Federal Foreign Office under Foreign Minister Frank-Walter Steinmeier in the government of Chancellor Angela Merkel; she was the first Muslim to hold that post.

From December 2016 until December 2021, Chebli served as State Secretary for Federal Affairs in the state government of the Governing Mayor of Berlin Michael Müller. As one of Berlin's representatives in the Bundesrat, she was a member Permanent Advisory Council, which is composed of the sixteen envoys of the federal states.

In August 2020, Chebli announced that she would run for a parliamentary seat in the 2021 national elections. For her candidacy, she won many well-known supporters, including Auschwitz survivor Esther Béjarano, musician Marius Müller-Westernhagen, art collector Julia Stoschek and actors Sebastian Koch and Clemens Schick. In an internal vote, however, she lost out against Michael Müller.

== Other activities ==
- Global Citizen, Member of the European Board (since 2021)
- German Council on Foreign Relations (DGAP), Member of the Presidium (since 2019)
- Apolitical Foundation, Member of the Global Advisor Network
- Centre for Feminist Foreign Policy (CFFP), Member of the Advisory Board
- Checkpoint Charlie Foundation, Member of the Supervisory Board
- Foundation "Remembrance, Responsibility and Future“ (EVZ), Member of the Board of Trustees
- German-Arab Friendship Association (DAFG), Co-Founder and Member of the Advisory Board

== Political positions ==
In an interview with German newspaper Frankfurter Allgemeine Zeitung in 2016, Chebli addressed the role of Sharia, saying, "it primarily deals with the personal relationship between God and humans. It addresses things like prayer, fasting and alms. That presents no problems for me as a democrat; it is absolutely compatible [with democracy], just as it is for Christians, Jews and anyone else." The statement caused controversy after her appointment to a governing position in Berlin.

Chebli has also denounced anti-Islam right wing German populists, telling Frankfurter Allgemeine Zeitung: "My father is a pious Muslim, hardly speaks German, can neither read nor write, but he is more integrated than many functionaries of the AfD who question our constitution."

Alarmed by displays of anti-Semitism among new immigrants to Germany in 2018, Chebli proposed required visits to Nazi concentration camp memorials, an idea which soon received support from the Central Council of Jews in Germany and the World Jewish Congress.

== Controversy ==
In January 2022, the Berlin Regional Court ruled that the publicist Roland Tichy must pay Chebli damages of 10,000 euros for sexist remarks about her in his publication Tichys Einblick.

== Personal life ==
Chebli has been married since 2006. In 2020, she gave birth to a son.

== Publications ==
- Ich träume davon, dass wir Muslime ein anderes Bild des Islams zeigen ("I dream that we Muslims show a different image of Islam") Die Zeit, 29. March 2012
- Muslimischsein – Deutschsein – Frausein ("Muslimness - Germanness - womanhood") spd-fem.net, Nov. 26, 2012
- Multi-Kulti oder Parallelgesellschaft? "Multi-culti" or "parallel society"? The debate on Muslim integration Diplomatic Magazine 5, 2013
