= Friedrich Merz =

Chancellor of Germany since 2025

Friedrich Merz MdB
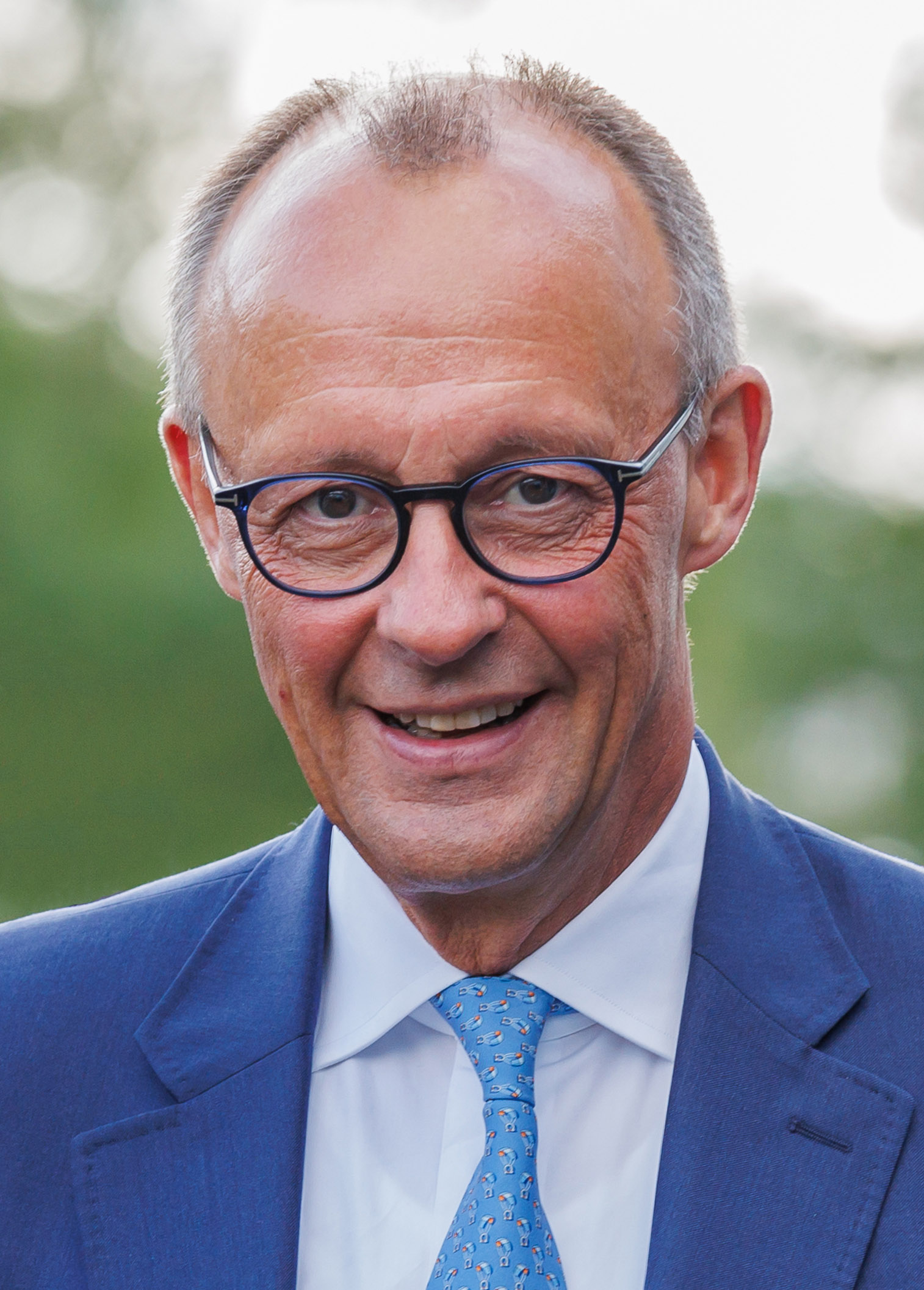
- Merz in 2024

Chancellor of Germany
- Incumbent
- Assumed office 6 May 2025
- President: Frank-Walter Steinmeier
- Vice Chancellor: Lars Klingbeil
- Preceded by: Olaf Scholz

Leader of the Christian Democratic Union
- Incumbent
- Assumed office 31 January 2022
- General Secretary: Mario Czaja; Carsten Linnemann
- Deputy: Andreas Jung; Karin Prien; Silvia Breher; Michael Kretschmer; Karl-Josef Laumann
- Preceded by: Armin Laschet

Leader of the Opposition
- In office 15 February 2022 – 6 May 2025
- Chancellor: Olaf Scholz
- Preceded by: Ralph Brinkhaus
- Succeeded by: Tino Chrupalla; Alice Weidel
- In office 29 February 2000 – 22 September 2002
- Chancellor: Gerhard Schröder
- Preceded by: Wolfgang Schäuble
- Succeeded by: Angela Merkel
Parliamentary offices
Leader of the CDU/CSU in the Bundestag
In office 15 February 2022 – 5 May 2025
First Deputy	Alexander Dobrindt
Chief Whip	Thorsten Frei
Preceded by	Ralph Brinkhaus
Succeeded by	Jens Spahn
In office 29 February 2000 – 22 September 2002
First Deputy	Michael Glos
Chief Whip	Hans-Peter Repnik
Preceded by	Wolfgang Schäuble
Succeeded by	Angela Merkel
Member of the Bundestag for Hochsauerlandkreis
Incumbent
Assumed office 26 October 2021
Preceded by	Patrick Sensburg
In office 10 November 1994 – 27 October 2009
Preceded by	Ferdinand Tillmann
Succeeded by	Patrick Sensburg
Member of the European Parliament for North Rhine-Westphalia
In office 22 July 1989 – 19 July 1994
Preceded by	multi-member district
Succeeded by	multi-member district
Constituency	Christian Democratic Union list

Personal details
- Born: Joachim-Friedrich Martin Josef Merz; 11 November 1955 (age 71) Brilon, North Rhine-Westphalia, West Germany
- Party: Christian Democratic Union (since 1972)
- Spouse: Charlotte Gass (m. 1981)
- Children: 3
- Education: University of Bonn; University of Marburg
- Website: www.friedrich-merz.de

Military service
- Allegiance: West Germany
- Branch/service: Bundeswehr
- Years of service: 1975–1976
- Unit: Panzer Artillery Training Battalion 310

Joachim-Friedrich Martin Josef Merz (Note: English: /mɛərts/ MAIRTS, German: [ˈfʁiːdʁɪç ˈmɛʁts].) (born 11 November 1955) is a German politician who has served as Chancellor of Germany since 6 May 2025. He has also served as Leader of the Christian Democratic Union (CDU) since January 2022, leading the CDU/CSU (Union) parliamentary group as Leader of the Opposition in the Bundestag from February 2022 to May 2025.

Merz was born in Brilon in the state of North Rhine-Westphalia in West Germany. He joined the Young Union in 1972. After finishing law school in 1985, Merz worked as a judge and corporate lawyer before entering full-time politics in 1989 when he was elected to the European Parliament. As a young politician in the 1970s and 1980s, Merz was a staunch supporter of anti-communism, the dominant political doctrine of West Germany and a core tenet of the CDU. He is seen as a representative of the traditional establishment conservative and pro-business wings of the CDU. His book Mehr Kapitalismus wagen (Venturing More Capitalism) advocates economic liberalism. After serving one term he was elected to the Bundestag, where he established himself as the leading financial policy expert in the CDU. He was elected chairman of the CDU/CSU parliamentary group in 2000, the same year as Angela Merkel was elected chairwoman of the CDU, and at the time they were chief rivals for the leadership of the party, which led the opposition together with CSU.

After the 2002 federal election, Merkel claimed the parliamentary group chairmanship for herself, while Merz was elected deputy parliamentary group leader. In December 2004, he resigned from this office, thereby giving up the years-long power struggle with Merkel and gradually withdrew from politics, focusing on his legal career and leaving parliament entirely in 2009, until his return to parliament in 2021. In 2004, he became a senior counsel at Mayer Brown, where he focused on mergers and acquisitions, banking and finance, and compliance. He has served on the boards of numerous companies, including BlackRock Germany. A corporate lawyer and reputed multimillionaire, Merz is also a licensed private pilot and owns two aeroplanes. In 2018, he announced his return to politics. He was elected CDU leader in December 2021, assuming the office in January 2022. He had failed to win the position in two previous leadership elections in 2018, and January 2021. In September 2024, he became the Union's candidate for Chancellor of Germany ahead of the following year's federal election. The CDU/CSU won a plurality of the seats and subsequently reached an agreement to form a coalition with the SPD. Merz was elected chancellor on 6 May 2025, taking two rounds to clear, which was a first in German history.

As chancellor, he has taken steps to ensure fiscal responsibility and border security. An early issue that arose at the start of his chancellorship has been the designation of the AfD as extremist. In foreign policy, he is a staunch supporter of the European Union, NATO, and the liberal international order, having described himself as "truly European, a convinced Transatlanticist, and a German open to the world". Merz advocates a closer union and "an army for Europe". Prior to the second presidency of Donald Trump, he was frequently described as being "exceptionally pro-American", and was once the chairman of the Atlantik-Brücke association which promotes German-American friendship and Atlanticism. Domestically, Merz's proposed welfare cuts and reforms have drawn criticism. His approval ratings fell sharply during his first year in office; in May 2026, he recorded the lowest level of satisfaction ever measured for a German chancellor by the ARD-Deutschlandtrend, a monthly national opinion poll.

== Early life and education ==
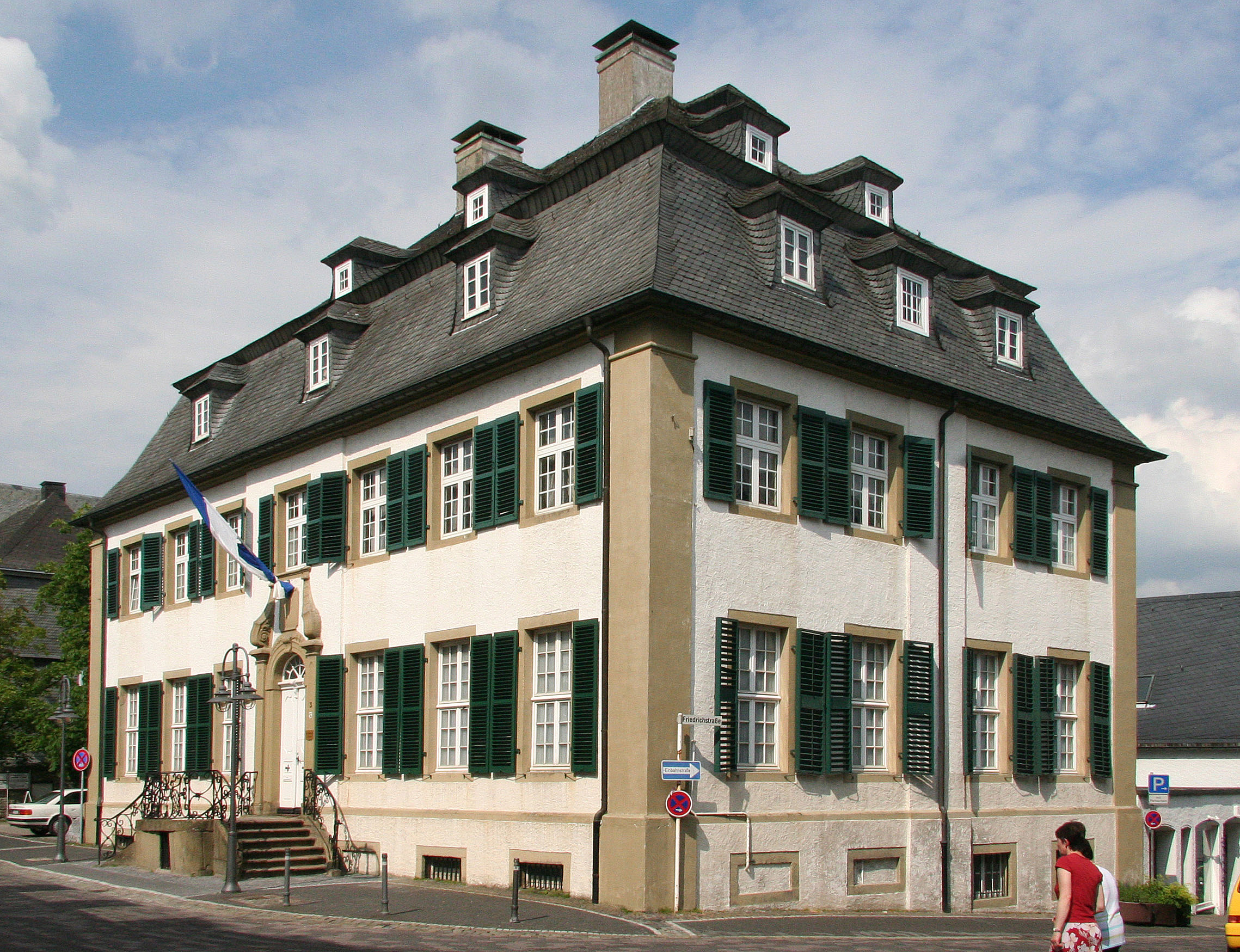
Haus Sauvigny, Merz's childhood home in Brilon

Joachim-Friedrich Martin Josef Merz was born on 11 November 1955 to Joachim Merz and Paula Sauvigny in Brilon in the state of North Rhine-Westphalia in West Germany. His father Joachim Merz, born on 7 January 1924, is a retired judge and was a member of the CDU. The Sauvigny family was a locally prominent patrician family in Brilon, of French ancestry. His maternal grandfather was Brilon mayor Josef Paul Sauvigny, who joined the Nazi Party in 1937. Merz is Catholic. Two of his three siblings died relatively early: his younger sister died at the age of 21 in a traffic accident and his brother died of multiple sclerosis before the age of 50.

From 1966 to 1971, Merz attended the Petrinum Grammar School in Brilon, which he left for disciplinary reasons, moving to the Friedrich-Spee Grammar School in Rüthen, where he finished his Abitur in 1975. From July 1975 to September 1976 Merz served his military service as a soldier with a self-propelled artillery unit of the German Army. From 1976 he studied law with a scholarship from the Konrad Adenauer Foundation, first at the University of Bonn, later at the University of Marburg. At Bonn he was a member of KDStV Bavaria Bonn, a Catholic student fraternity founded in 1844 that is part of the Cartellverband. After finishing law school in 1985, he became a District Court judge in Saarbrücken. In 1986, he left his position in order to work as an in-house attorney-at-law at the German Chemical Industry Association in Bonn and Frankfurt from 1986 to 1989.

== Early political career ==
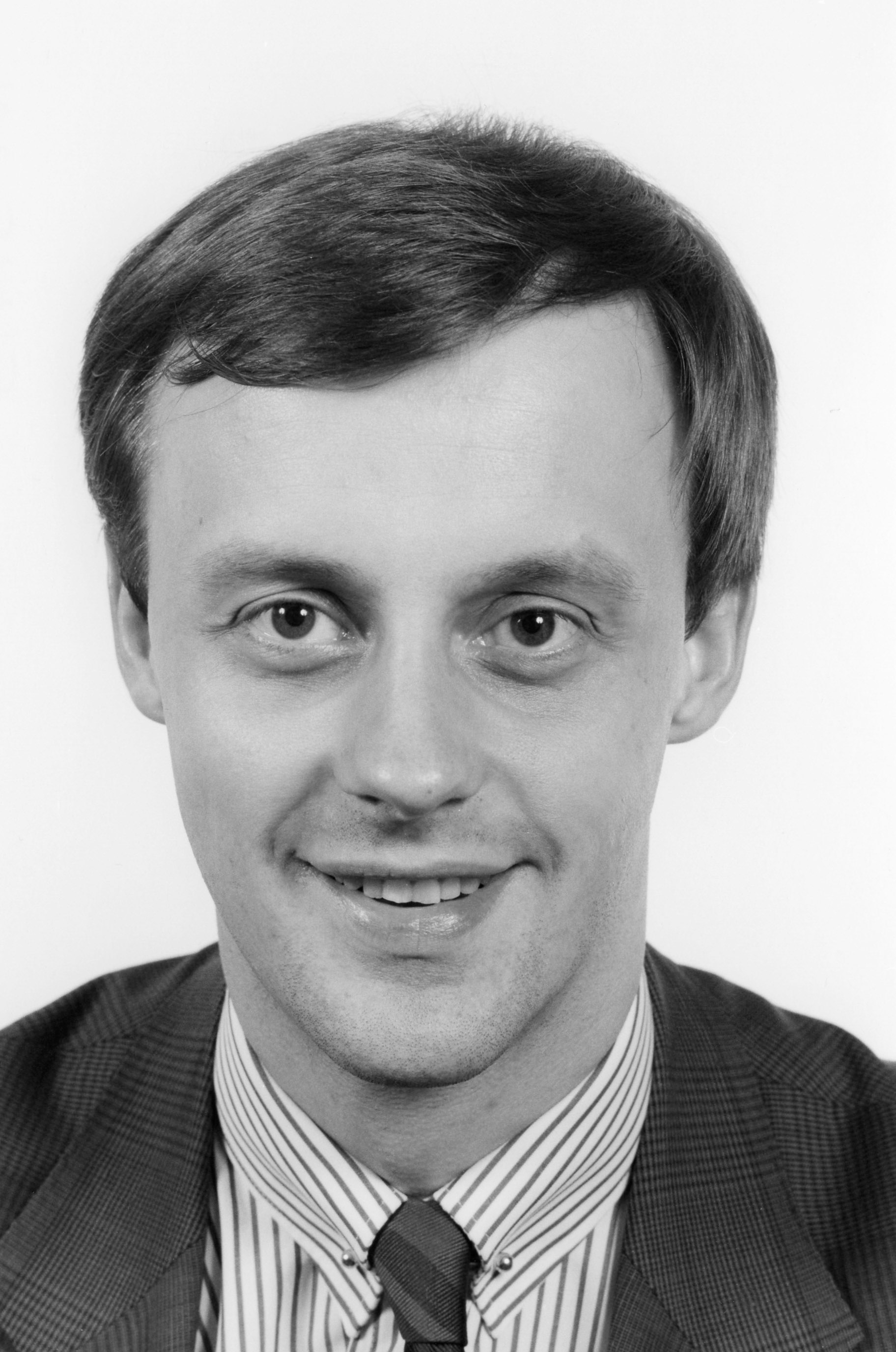
Merz as a young Christian Democrat MEP in 1989

In 1972, at the age of seventeen, he became a member of the CDU's youth wing, the Young Union. In 1980 he became President of the Brilon branch of the Young Union.

=== Member of the European Parliament (1989–1994) ===
Merz successfully ran as a candidate in the 1989 European Parliament election and served one term as a Member of the European Parliament until 1994. He was a member of the Committee on Economic and Monetary Affairs and of the parliament's delegation for relations with Malta.

=== Member of the Bundestag (1994–2009) ===
From the 1994 German elections, he served as member of the Bundestag for his constituency, the Hochsauerland. In his first term, he was a member of the Finance Committee.

In October 1998 Merz became vice-chairman and in February 2000 Chairman of the CDU/CSU parliamentary group (alongside Michael Glos), succeeding Wolfgang Schäuble. In this capacity, he was the opposition leader in the Bundestag during Chancellor Gerhard Schröder's first term.

Ahead of the 2002 elections, Edmund Stoiber included Merz in his shadow cabinet for the Christian Democrats' campaign to unseat incumbent Schröder as chancellor. During the campaign, Merz served as Stoiber's expert for financial markets and the national budget. After Stoiber's electoral defeat, Angela Merkel assumed the leadership of the parliamentary group; Merz again served as vice-chairman until 2004. From 2002 to 2004, he was also a member of the executive board of the CDU, again under the leadership of Merkel.

In 2004, Merz gave a speech to local constituents criticising the "red" (Social Democratic) mayor of his hometown, Brilon, and called for the "red town hall" to be stormed. He noted that his grandfather, Josef Paul Sauvigny, had been mayor of Brilon. This statement drew criticism, for Sauvigny had been a mayor under Nazi rule. While it is not known whether he was a formal member of the Nazi Party at the time (though he joined later), Sauvigny remained mayor after the Nazis seized power and repressed their political opponents. During his tenure, he praised the Nazi "national revolution" and renamed streets in his town after Adolf Hitler and Hermann Göring.

In 2005 he was described by German media as a new member of the Andean Pact, an informal network of CDU men formed in 1979 by then members of the Young Union during a trip to the South American Andes region. The Andean pact stood in opposition to Merkel, especially in the five years before she became chancellor in 2005, after she had become chairperson of the CDU. Years before his admission, Merz had already a "fundamental loyalty" to his peers in the Andean Pact. Between 2005 and 2009, Merz was a member of the Committee on Legal Affairs. In 2006, he was one of nine parliamentarians who filed a complaint at the Federal Constitutional Court against the disclosure of additional sources of income; the complaint was ultimately unsuccessful. By 2007, he announced he would not be running for political office in the 2009 elections.

== Private sector career (2009–2018) ==
Upon leaving politics, Merz worked as a corporate lawyer. From 2004 he was a Senior Counsel at Mayer Brown's Düsseldorf office, where he worked on the corporate finance team; before 2004 he was a senior counsel with Cornelius Bartenbach Haesemann.

Between 2010 and 2011, Merz was commissioned by the state's Financial Market Stabilization Fund (Soffin) to lead the sale of WestLB, a bank majority-controlled by the state of North Rhine-Westphalia, to a private investor. He was criticized in the media for his multi-million-euro salary, as he received a fee of €5,000 per day for unsuccessful work, including Saturdays and Sundays, totaling €1,980,000 from taxpayers.

His work as a lawyer and board member has made him a multimillionaire. He has also taken on numerous positions on corporate boards, including as successor to deceased politicians:

- Robert Bosch GmbH, member of International Advisory Committee (since 2011)
- WEPA Hygieneprodukte GmbH, chairman of the supervisory board (since 2009)
- Deutsche Rockwool, member of the Supervisory Board
- Ernst & Young Germany, member of the Advisory Board
- Odewald & Compagnie, member of the Advisory Board
- DBV-Winterthur Holding, member of the Supervisory Board
- Cologne Bonn Airport, chairman of the supervisory board (2017–2020)
- BlackRock Germany, chairman of the supervisory board (2016–2020)
- Stadler Rail, member of the Board of Directors (2006–2020)
- HSBC Trinkaus, chairman of the advisory board (2010–2019)
- Borussia Dortmund, member of the supervisory board (2010–2014)
- Axa Konzern AG, member of the supervisory board (2007–2014)
- IVG Immobilien, member of the supervisory board (2006–2010)
- Deutsche Börse, member of the supervisory board (2005–2015)
- Interseroh, member of the supervisory board (2005–2009)

In 2012, he joined Norbert Röttgen's campaign team for the North Rhine-Westphalia state election as advisor on economic policy. He served as a CDU delegate to the Federal Convention for the purpose of electing the President of Germany in 2012 and in 2017.

In November 2017, Merz was appointed by Minister-President Armin Laschet of North Rhine-Westphalia as his Commissioner for Brexit and Transatlantic Relations, an unpaid advisory position.

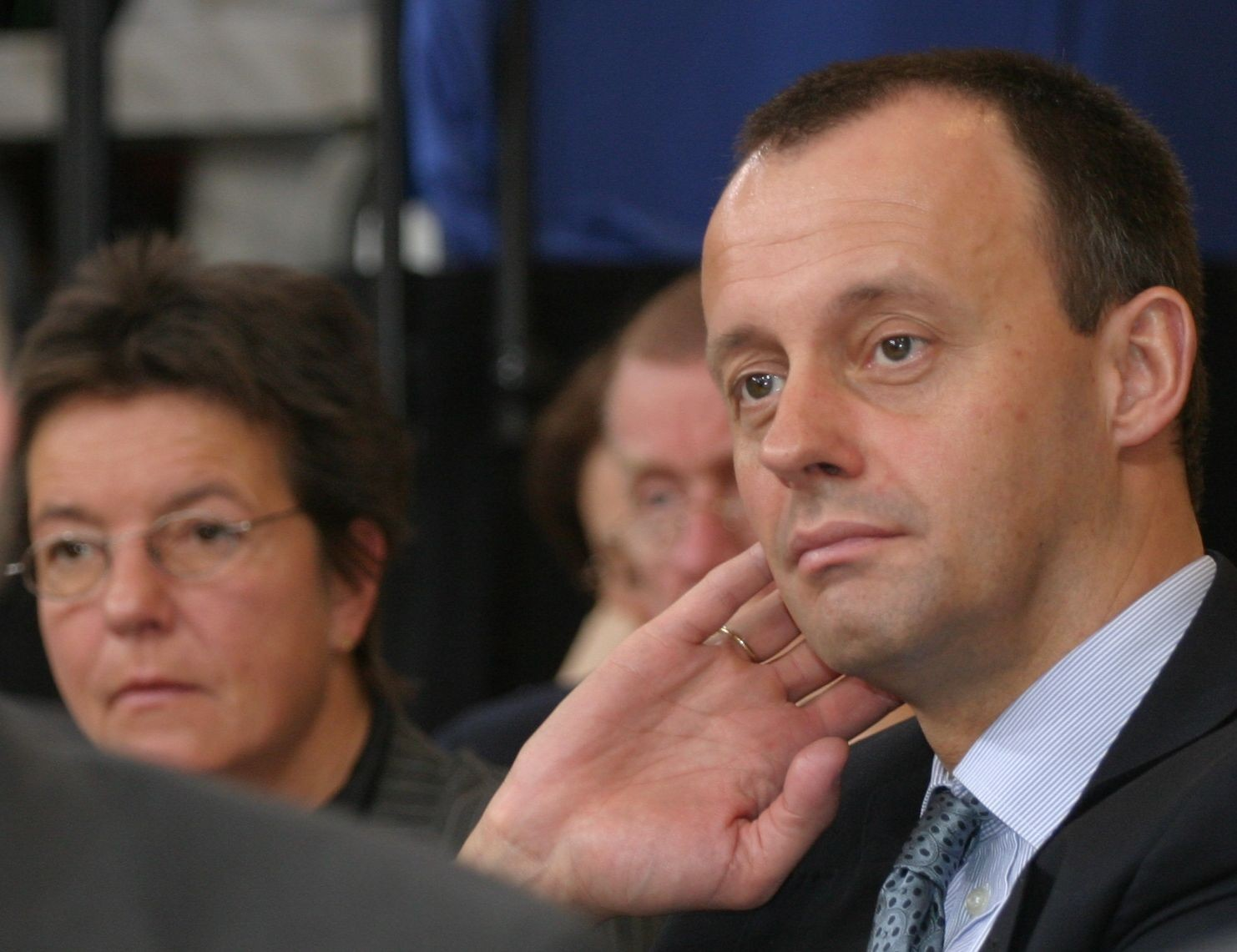
Merz in 2004

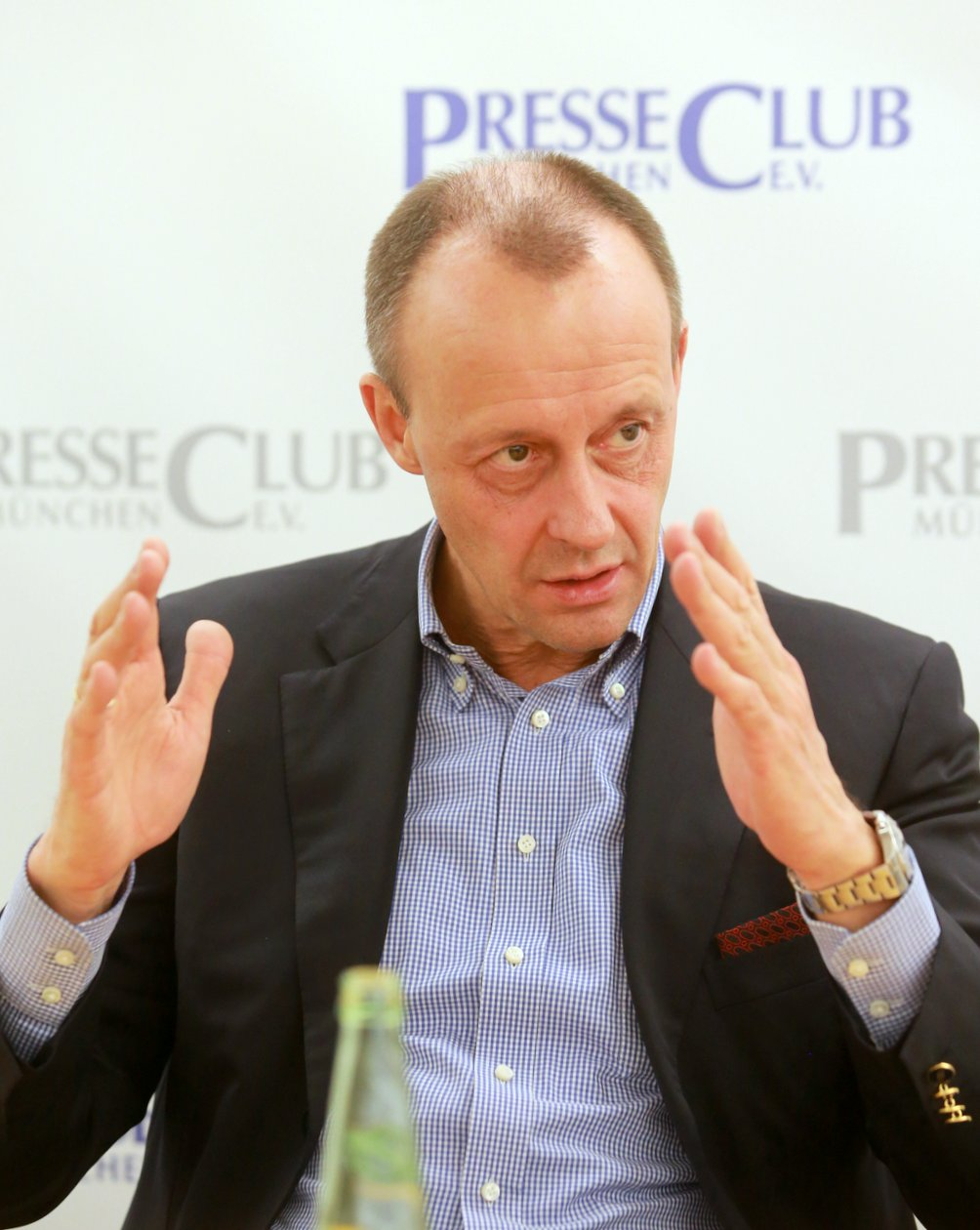
Merz in 2017

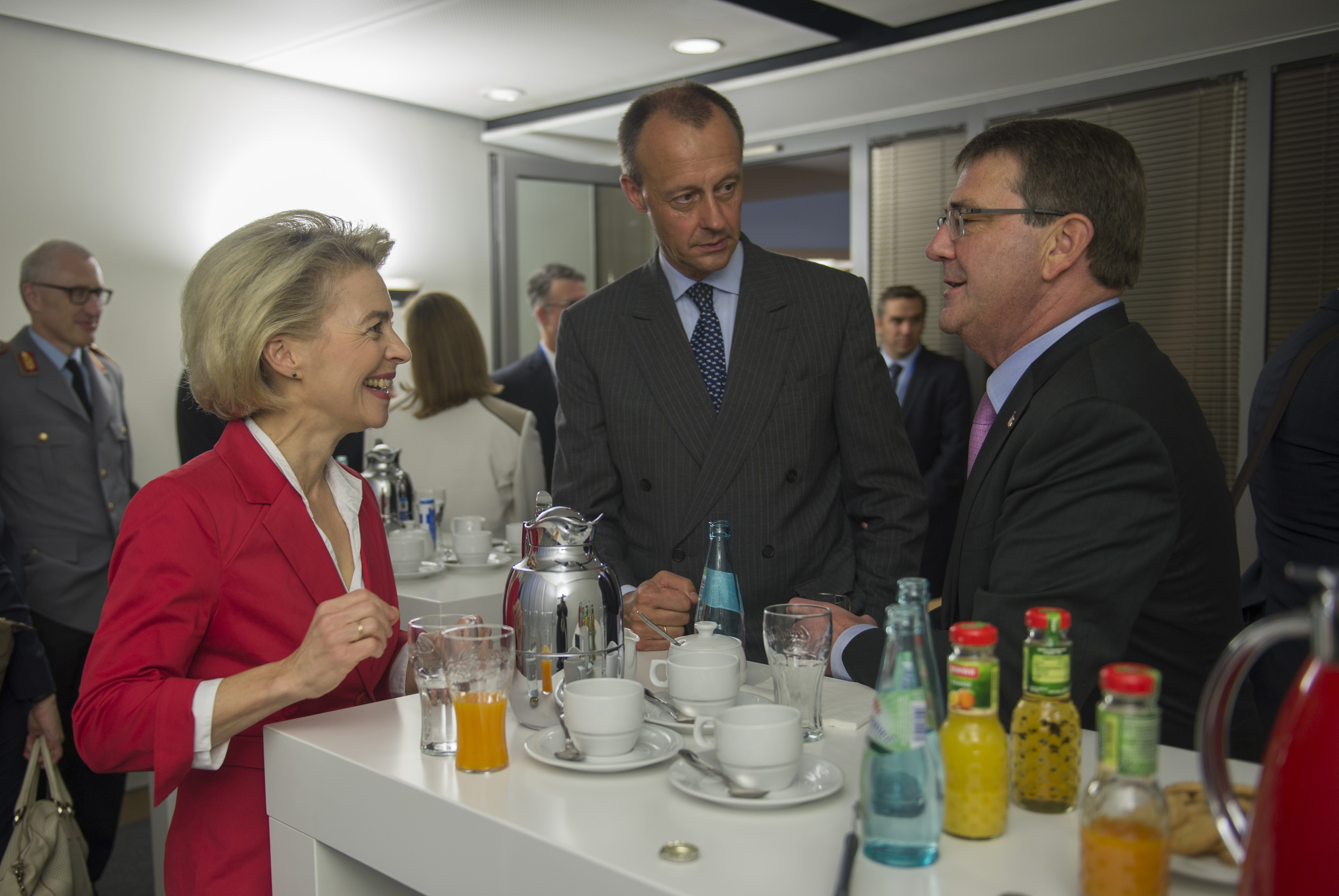
Merz as chairman of the Atlantic Bridge with US defence secretary Ash Carter and German defence minister Ursula von der Leyen in 2015

== Return to politics ==
After Angela Merkel announced her intention to step down as leader of the CDU party, Merz announced he would run in the subsequent 2018 party leadership election. His candidacy was promoted by the former CDU chairman and "crown prince" of the Kohl era, Wolfgang Schäuble (former President of the Bundestag, ranked second in federal precedence). On 7 December 2018, in the second round of the leadership election, Merz was defeated by Annegret Kramp-Karrenbauer.

On 25 February 2020, he announced his candidacy in the first 2021 CDU leadership election. His closest competitors were Armin Laschet and Norbert Röttgen. After several postponements, the election of the new CDU party president took place at the party congress on 15–16 January 2021, which was the first time in the party's history that it was held fully online. In the first round, Merz received 385 votes, 5 more than Laschet. In the second round, Merz failed to win the party president's post for the second time, receiving 466 votes out of 1001 delegates, while Laschet received 521 votes.

The same day, after losing the leadership election, Merz proposed to "join the current government and take over the Ministry for Economy". The ministry was already headed by his party colleague Peter Altmaier at the time and the proposal was rebuffed. Laschet was quick to placate Merz by recruiting him to his campaign team. Laschet justified this by saying that Merz was "without doubt a team player" and that his economic and financial expertise could provide crucial help in overcoming the huge challenge of the pandemic in a sustainable way.

Ahead of the 2021 German federal election, Patrick Sensburg, Merz's successor in his seat in the Bundestag, failed to secure his party's support for a new candidacy. Merz instead replaced him, returning to the Bundestag after a 12-year absence.

=== Chairman of the CDU (2022–present) ===
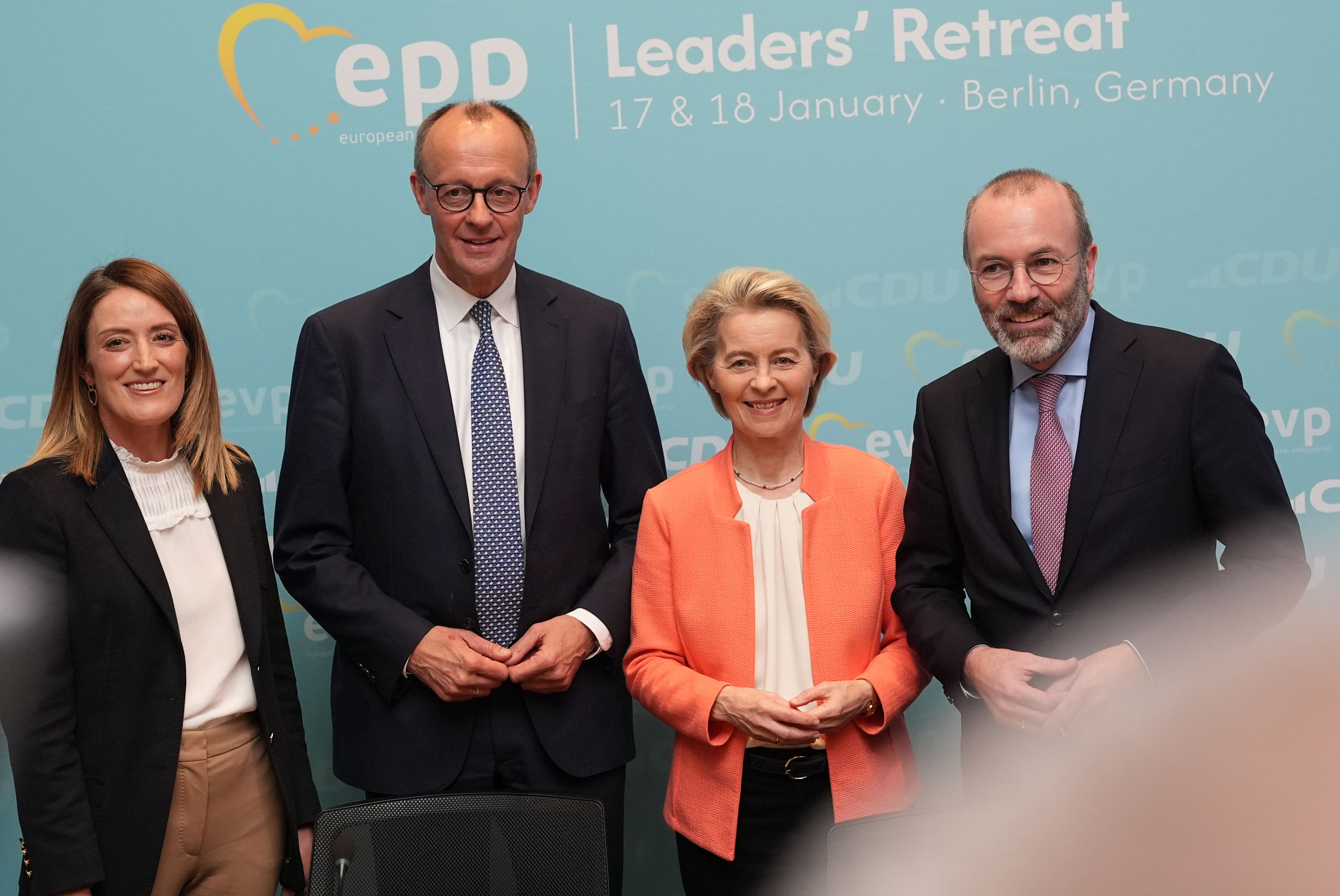
Left to right: Roberta Metsola, Merz, Ursula von der Leyen and Manfred Weber at the European People's Party summit in Berlin, 17 January 2025

On 15 November 2021, Merz announced his candidacy in the second 2021 CDU leadership election. His opponents were Norbert Röttgen and Helge Braun.

During their short campaign, Merz's rivals positioned themselves as Merkel's heirs. Against them, Merz promised a decisive break with the centrist line Merkel had followed for 16 years.

In total, some 400,000 CDU members were able to vote online or by letter. By 17 December 2021, Merz had already won an absolute majority of 62.1 per cent of the membership in the first round of voting, so a second round of voting was not necessary. This meant that at his third attempt, he managed to win the party presidency. Asked for his reaction to the results of the vote, Merz said: "Quietly I just said to myself, 'WOW'; but only quietly, the winning marching songs are far from me".

Merz was formally elected Chairman of the CDU by its 1001 congress delegates at the virtual federal party congress on 22 January 2022. In the end, 915 out of 983 delegates voted for him, winning 94.6% of the valid votes to become the leader of the largest opposition party in the Bundestag. The vote was formally a so-called "digital pre-vote", the result of which was confirmed in writing by the delegates.

After Annegret Kramp-Karrenbauer and Armin Laschet, Merz became the third leader of the Christian Democratic Union within three years. He officially took office as party leader on 31 January 2022.

==== CDU chancellor candidate (2025) ====
In September 2024, Merz became the Union's designated candidate for Chancellor of Germany in the 2025 federal election, after Hendrik Wüst (CDU) and Markus Söder (CSU) decided not to run and after both declared their support for Merz. Due to the collapse of the incumbent governing coalition in November 2024, the election took place seven months ahead of schedule.

Exit polls released following the 2025 federal election showed CDU would win the most seats in the German parliament, albeit with its second worst result ever, thus ensuring Merz the role of Chancellor of Germany.

In the aftermath of the election, the Christian Democratic Union (CDU) and the Social Democratic Party (SPD) initiated coalition talks to form the next government. In the federal election the CDU, led by Merz, emerged as the strongest party but fell short of an absolute majority, necessitating coalition negotiations. The SPD, under the leadership of Lars Klingbeil, entered discussions to explore potential collaboration. The expected CDU/CSU–SPD coalition would form what is historically referred to in German politics as a Große Koalition (Grand Coalition, although that term describes the coalition of the two biggest parties, which the SPD is not since the 2025 election).

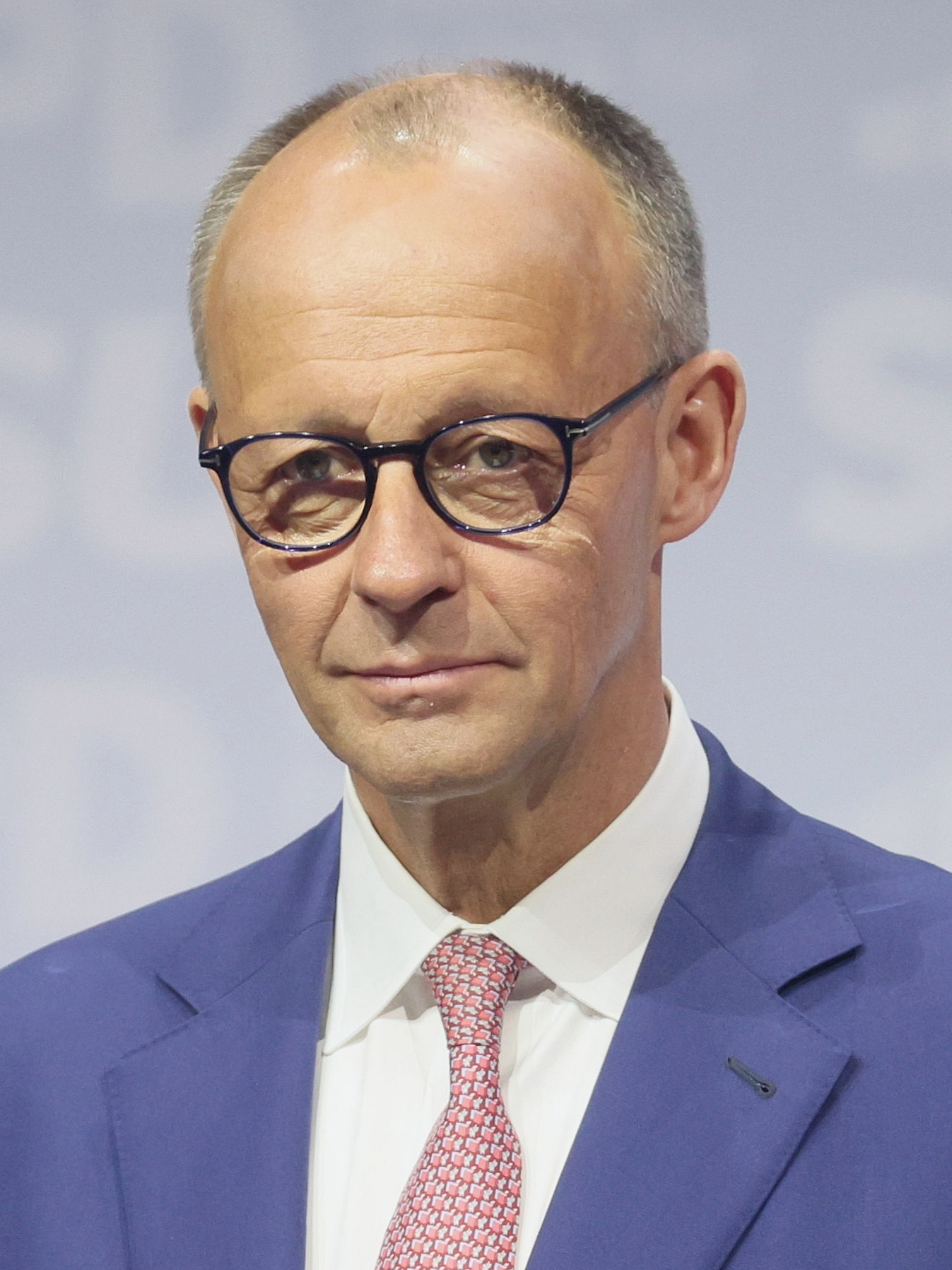
Merz on the day of the signing of the coalition agreement, one day before his election as chancellor

On 5 March 2025, Merz proposed a significant increase in defence spending. He stated at the press conference: "Germany and Europe must quickly strengthen their defence capabilities. The CDU, CSU and SPD will table a motion to amend the Basic Law so that defence spending above 1% of GDP is exempt from the debt brake". This would allow Germany to increase its debt without limits in order to finance its military and provide military assistance to Ukraine. Economists have warned that Merz's plan could trigger inflation and increase Germany's government debt. Germany would pay approximately €71 billion in interest annually from 2035. During negotiations for the next German cabinet, Merz and outgoing Chancellor Olaf Scholz reached an agreement to reform the debt brake by amending Paragraphs 109, 115 and 143h of the Basic Law to exempt defence spending exceeding 1% of GDP. Next to the defence spending Merz agreed to create a special fund of €500 billion for "investments in infrastructure and for additional investments to achieve climate neutrality by 2045". On 18 March 2025, German lawmakers approved the amendment to the Basic Law. The change will allow the Merz government to spend €500 billion on infrastructure and green energy within 10 years and to have defence spending above 1% of GDP to be exempted from the debt brake; this allows an unlimited debt-based financing of defence spending. Merz, who had promised to not touch the debt brake rule prior to the German federal election, justified the increase in defence spending by the threat from Russia, citing Putin's "war of aggression against Europe". He called the decision "the first major step towards a new European defence community." He also planned to increase military aid to Ukraine. The trillion-euro spending package was approved before the 21st Bundestag was constituted on 25 March 2025, where The Left and AfD would have the ability to block it. A two-thirds majority was needed to change the constitution. The plan was supported by the CDU, CSU, SPD, and the Greens. Merz's fiscal package was welcomed by French President Emmanuel Macron, NATO Secretary General Mark Rutte, and European Commission President Ursula von der Leyen.

On 9 April 2025, Merz, together with the CSU party leader Markus Söder and the SPD co-leaders Lars Klingbeil and Saskia Esken, presented the coalition agreement for the planned black-red coalition. This agreement was signed on 5 May 2025, after internal party votes on a government coalition were approved in the three parties in the weeks before.

== Chancellor (2025–present) ==
On 6 May, when the first round of voting took place, Merz was not confirmed as the next chancellor when he unexpectedly failed to achieve an absolute majority in parliament with only 310 votes in favour of his leadership out of a required 316 out of 630 votes. It was the first time in German history a chancellor candidate did not receive the necessary votes in the first attempt. A second round of voting took place on the same day, resulting in him being elected as chancellor with 325 votes. Merz and his cabinet were sworn in on the same day of the voting.

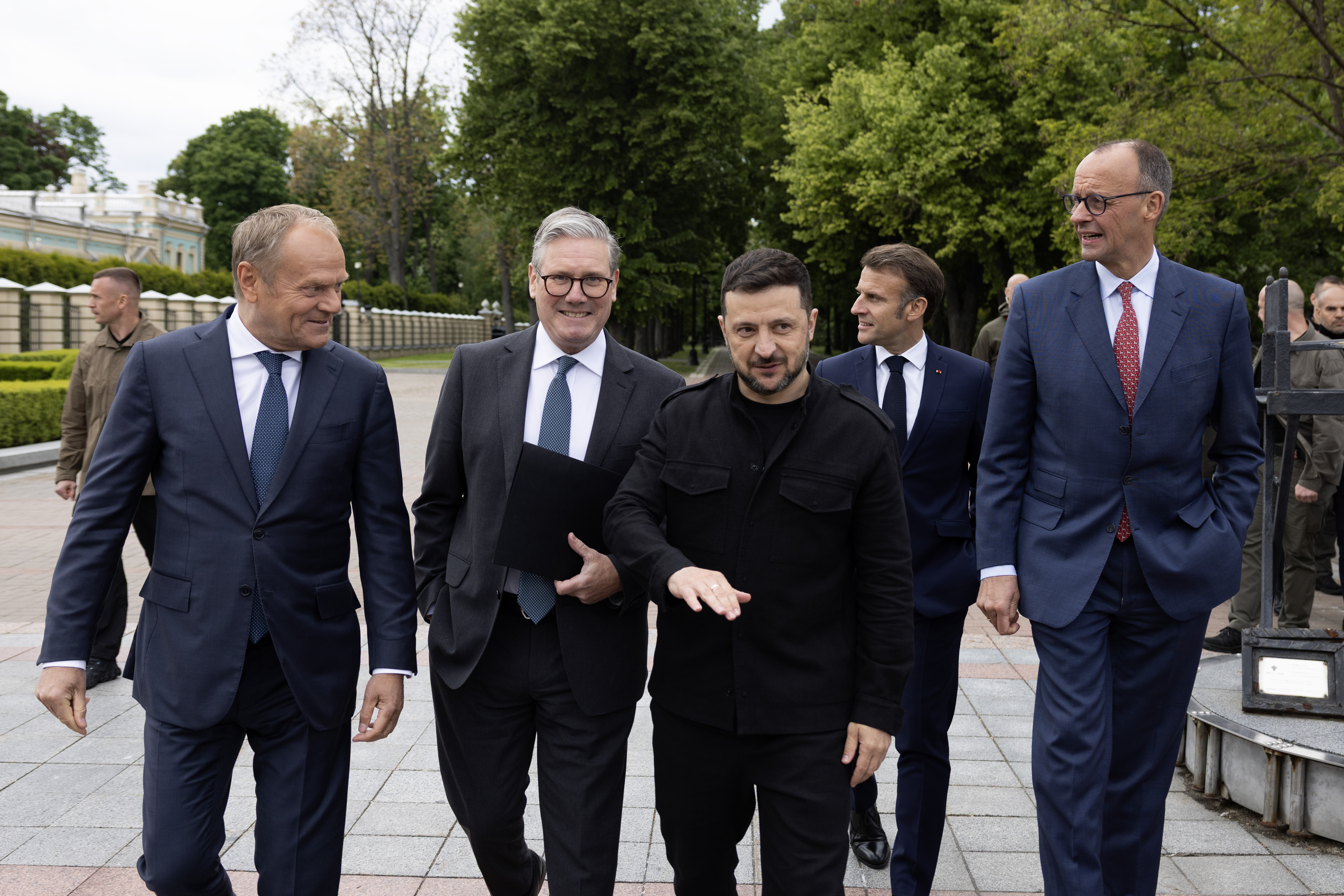
May 2025 visit to Ukraine, from left: Polish Prime Minister Donald Tusk, British Prime Minister Keir Starmer, Ukrainian President Volodymyr Zelenskyy, French President Emmanuel Macron, Merz

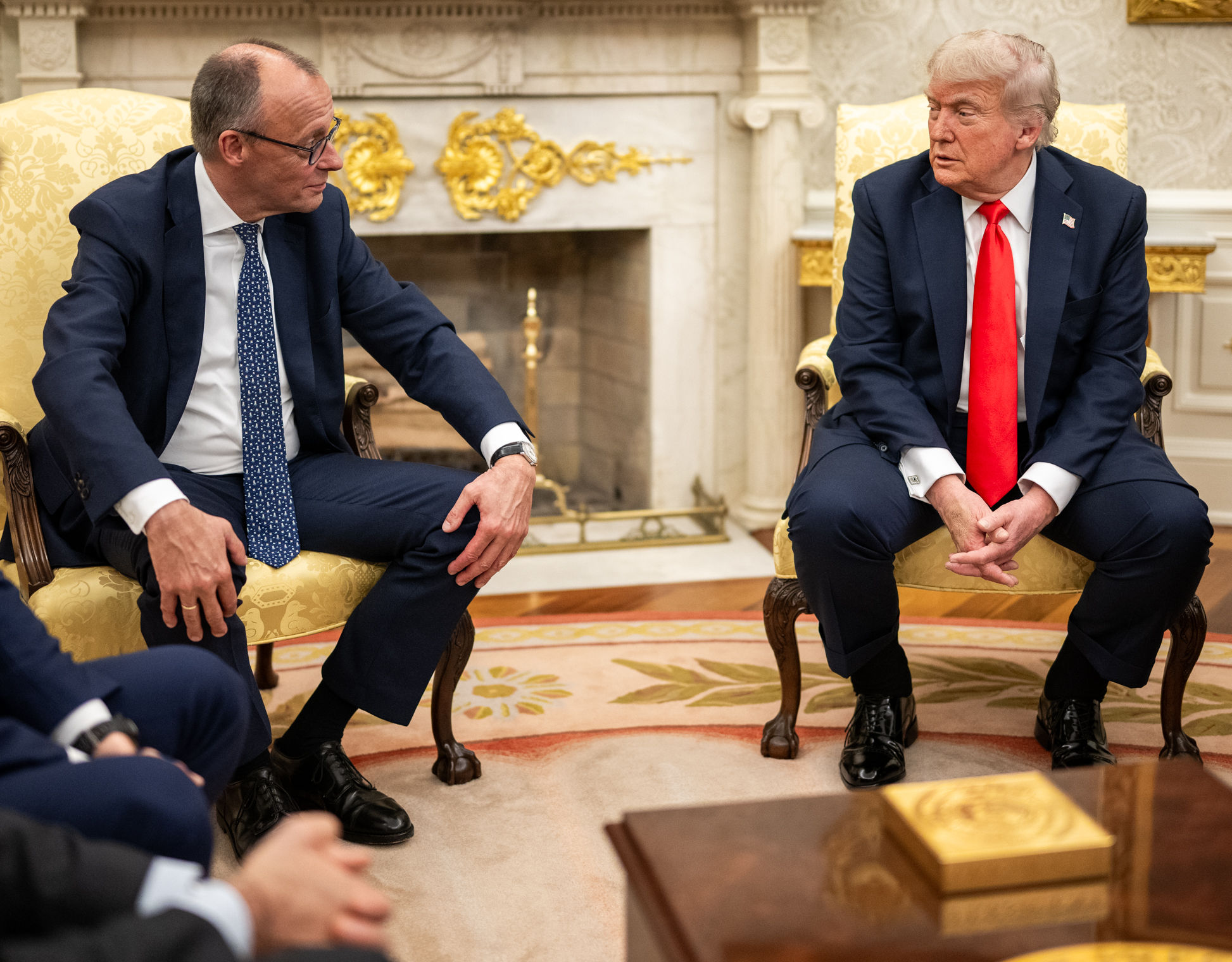
Merz in the White House with US president Donald Trump on 5 June 2025

One of his first official acts was the restructuring of the ministries and the creation of a Ministry for Digital and State Modernization. On 7 May, he made his first foreign visit as Chancellor, meeting in France with President Emmanuel Macron and jointly announcing the creation of a Franco-German Defence and Security Council and afterwards meeting with Prime Minister of Poland, Donald Tusk, in Warsaw, emphasizing relations within the Weimar Triangle.

Friedrich Merz is one of Germany’s most unpopular chancellors. In April 2026, only 15% of Germans said they were satisfied with his government’s policies. In October 2026, his popularity rating dropped to 10%, the lowest value ever polled for a German chancellor.

Since his return to politics in 2021, Merz has filed numerous criminal complaints for simple insults, such as "blockhead" or "Pinocchio."

After the CDU yielded its lowest result to-date at the 2026 Saxony-Anhalt state election, Merz cited his personal unpopularity as a factor in the defeat. The Saxony-Anhalt election as well as various other factors led to the 2026 Friedrich Merz political crisis, in which some parts of the public and media openly called for Merz's resignation, deeming him unfit for the position of Chancellor.

=== Foreign policy ===
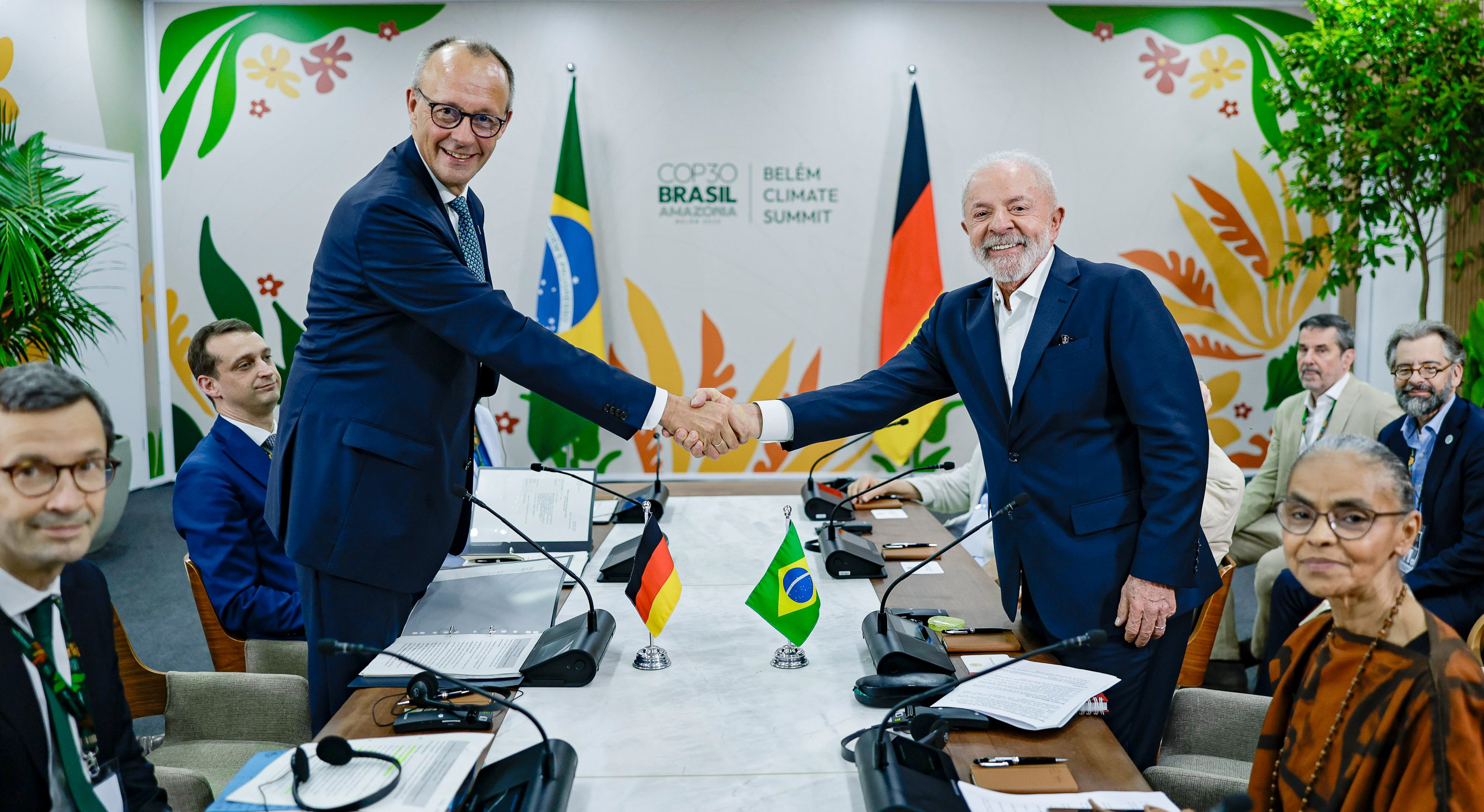
Merz and Brazilian President Luiz Inácio Lula da Silva at the Belém Climate Summit in Belém, Brazil, 7 November 2025

Merz's chancellery has been described as very active abroad, and he has engaged in an unusual number of high-profile foreign visits in his first few months, emphasising European and Western unity.

==== Israel ====
On 24 February 2025, following the federal election, Merz indicated his intention to invite Israeli Prime Minister Benjamin Netanyahu for an official visit to Germany, describing the invitation as a challenge to the International Criminal Court's (ICC) decision to issue arrest warrants for Netanyahu and former Defense Minister Yoav Gallant over alleged war crimes.

Following his election as chancellor, Merz reaffirmed Germany's commitment to Israel's security, defining it as an unconditional element of German state rationale (Staatsräson). In international diplomacy, his administration consistently opposed multilateral efforts to isolate Israel. In October 2025, Merz publicly stated that Germany should withdraw from the 2026 Eurovision Song Contest if the European Broadcasting Union excluded Israel. Following geopolitical escalations in the Middle East in early 2026, his cabinet expanded defensive military exports to Israel and expedited bureaucratic approval processes for defense contracts.

==== Gulf states ====
In February 2026, Merz conducted a three-day diplomatic tour of Saudi Arabia, Qatar, and the United Arab Emirates (UAE) aimed at diversifying Germany's energy imports and expanding strategic alliances to reduce economic reliance on the United States and China. During the tour, Merz announced a significant shift in German foreign policy by adopting a less restrictive stance on arms exports to autocratically governed Gulf nations, stating that the federal government intended to increase defense cooperation with regional partners. Following talks with Saudi Crown Prince Mohammed bin Salman in Riyadh, Merz indicated a readiness to approve pending defense contracts, including transport aircraft, defending the decision as a measure to stabilize regional security through strengthened capabilities.

==== China ====
Under the Merz administration, Germany's foreign policy toward China focused on "de-risking without decoupling," aiming to maintain vital free-trade relations while addressing structural economic imbalances. During his first official state visit to Beijing in February 2026, Merz adopted a direct stance on trade by warning Chinese leadership that the expanding bilateral trade deficit, which was driven by state subsidies and industrial overcapacity, was unsustainable and incompatible with fair, rules-based multilateral trade standards. However, his approach faced domestic and international criticism from human rights organizations and policy analysts, who argued that his administration subordinated human rights concerns to commercial interests, particularly following major trade agreements secured during the summit. Critics further noted that Merz's emphasis on traditional free-trade diplomacy diverged from the European Union's broader implementation of protectionist tariffs against Chinese technology imports, creating a policy misalignment with European trade strategies.

=== Social policy ===
Merz's push to reduce social spending and reform Germany's welfare system drew criticism from Social Democrats, who opposed reforms focused primarily on benefit cuts. Human Rights Watch warned that planned welfare cuts and tougher sanctions risked worsening poverty and undermining the right to an adequate standard of living.

=== Defense ===
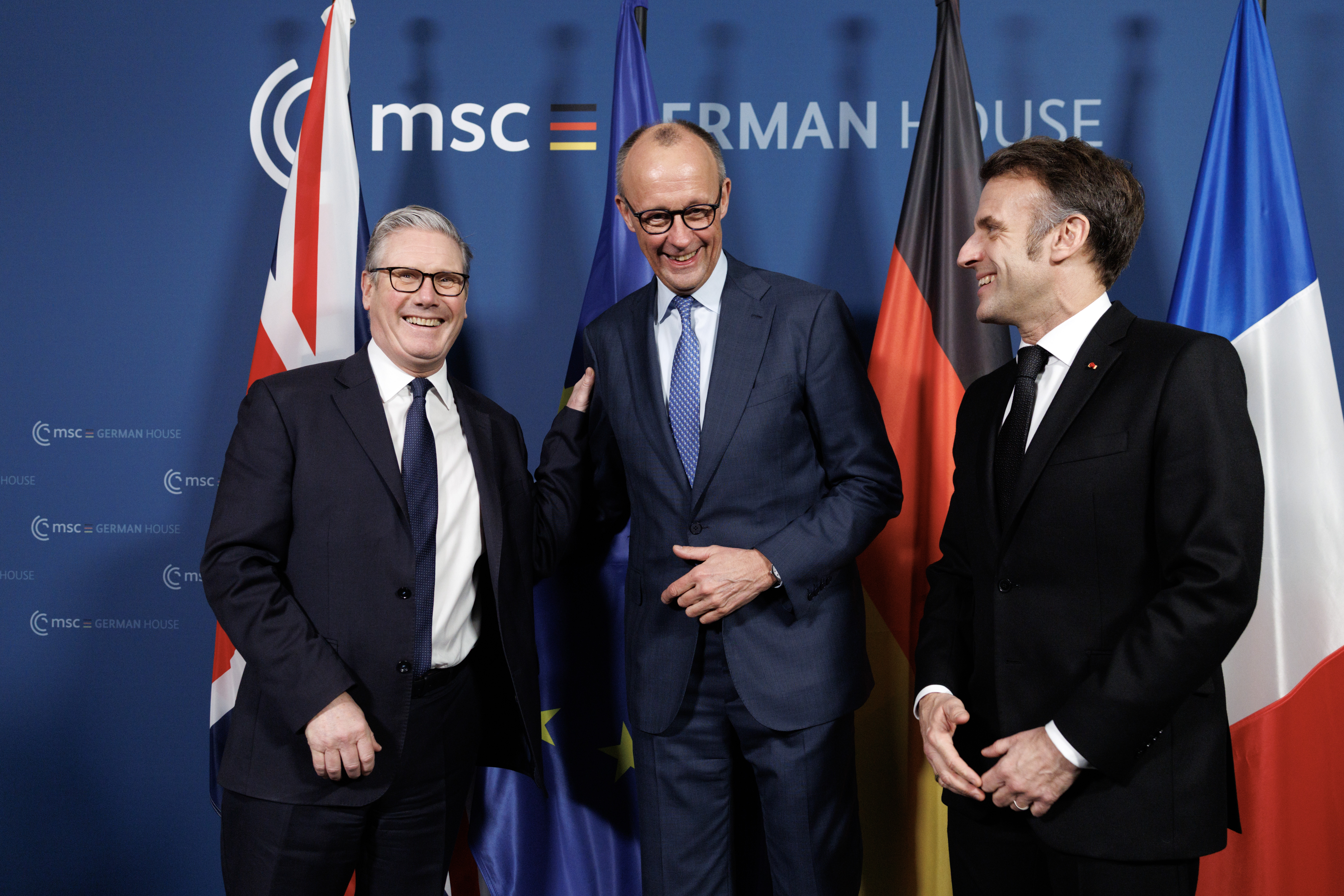
UK Prime Minister Keir Starmer, Friedrich Merz, and French President Emmanuel Macron at the Munich Security Conference, 13 February 2026

In his first government speech Merz announced that his "government will provide the Bundeswehr with all the financial resources it needs to become the strongest conventional army in Europe".

Merz initiated a historic expansion of Germany's military capabilities, pledging to build "the strongest conventional army in Europe" to deter potential aggression and meet the demands of international allies. Asserting that European nations must end what he termed a defense "free-ride" on the United States, Merz aligned Germany with revised NATO objectives by committing to raise core defense spending to 3.5% of the country's gross domestic product (GDP) by 2029, a notable increase from the 2.4% baseline in 2025. Additionally, he proposed allocating an extra 1.5% of GDP toward defense-related infrastructure and national resilience, raising Germany's long-term cumulative defense spending target to 5% of GDP.

To secure the financial resources for this rearmament, Merz's administration oversaw a major legislative shift by modifying the execution of Germany's constitutional debt brake (Schuldenbremse). Under the new framework, necessary defense expenditures exceeding 1% of GDP were exempted from strict deficit limits, facilitating expansive borrowing specifically for military modernization. This enabled his cabinet to approve an €82.69 billion defense budget for the 2026 fiscal year, representing the highest nominal defense allocation in the history of the Federal Republic, designed to accelerate multi-billion euro procurement programs and expand domestic arms manufacturing.

=== Economy ===
Following his ascension to the chancellorship, Merz frequently warned against the threat of structural deindustrialization, arguing that Germany was at risk of losing its manufacturing core due to uncompetitive business conditions. In a January 2026 memorandum to his coalition partners, he characterized the state of German industry as "very critical," highlighting that high labor costs, tax burdens, and bureaucratic hurdles were causing massive challenges and job losses across both small firms and manufacturing giants. Merz linked these economic strains directly to rising unemployment, which threatened to breach the three million mark amid a multi-year stagnation of economic growth. He publicly asserted that maintaining national prosperity would require an increase in economic efficiency, criticizing societal dependencies on a four-day workweek and a focus on work-life balance.

=== Energy policy ===
Rising energy costs have led to increased political debate regarding the EU ETS. In early 2026, Merz briefly advocated for the policy's abolition before reaffirming his government's commitment to EU climate targets.

=== Immigration ===
In March 2026, during a session of the Bundestag, Merz addressed the issue of violence against women, describing a perceived "explosion of violence" in both physical and digital spaces. He stated that a "significant portion" of this violence originated from immigrant groups and emphasized the need to openly discuss the causes of such criminality.

In March 2026, during a state visit to Berlin by Syrian President Ahmed al-Sharaa, Merz stated that approximately 80% of Syrians living in Germany were expected to return home within the following three years. Merz characterized the situation in Syria as having 'changed fundamentally' since the end of the civil war and called for a reassessment of the need for international protection for Syrian nationals.

Under the Merz administration, the German government pursued a dual-track immigration strategy that combined stricter asylum restrictions with proactive measures to recruit qualified economic migrants. In November 2025, Merz explicitly appealed to the global labor market, stating that Germany must present itself as an "open, free, liberal, and tolerant country" to attract global talent necessary to sustain its industrial sector and social security systems.

To streamline economic migration, his cabinet expanded the points-based Opportunity Card (Chancenkarte) system for non-EU professionals and eased bureaucratic barriers by allowing skilled immigrants with recognized degrees and two years of professional experience to start working immediately while completing the formal equivalence process. Furthermore, Merz pledged to establish a centralized, digitized portal within a reformed "Work-and-Stay" framework to eliminate visa backlogs. As part of this targeted economic recruitment, the administration also upheld an expanded annual quota of 90,000 skilled work visas for Indian citizens.

=== Violence against women ===
Protest against Merz, slogan written in black on white sign: "Titties out! Cocks in! Merz raus", at the "We are coming out, Free the nipple gender equality bike ride on 4th July 2026 in Berlin, Mauerpark, Amphitheater

Following the national debate over rape law following the high profile case of Collien Fernandes involving "deepfakes", Merz replied to a question about his plans to fight sexual violence, during a Bundestag meeting "We have an explosion of violence in our society, both in the analogue and the digital realm... we also have to talk about the causes... And then we also have to address the fact that a significant portion of this violence comes from immigrant groups in the Federal Republic of Germany,".

== Political positions ==
Merz has focused on economic, foreign, security, and family policies. He is seen as a representative of the pro-business wing of the CDU. He is viewed as an economic liberal who makes some concessions to conservative party members who stress the need for social engagement. Merz embraces some conservative social policies regarding families, although the Berliner Morgenpost says he is not as "dogmatic" as in his early political career. He is associated with neoliberalism.

As a young politician in the 1970s and 1980s, he was a staunch supporter of anti-communism, the dominant state doctrine of West Germany and a core tenet of the CDU. His book Mehr Kapitalismus wagen (transl: Venturing More Capitalism) advocates economic liberalism.

=== Asylum, migration and integration ===
Merz says he sees limiting irregular migration as the most important task after the 2025 German federal election. Merz criticized Angela Merkel's policy of open borders during the 2015 European migrant crisis. In 2024, Merz called for asylum seekers to be comprehensively rejected directly at the border. (Note: The right to seek and to enjoy in other countries asylum from persecution is a human right, as defined in article 14 of the Universal Declaration of Human Rights by the United Nations (UN). Germany became a full member of the UN on 18 September 1973. Furthermore, article 16a of the German constitution states that politically persecuted persons have the right to asylum (Politisch Verfolgte genießen Asylrecht), and as Chancellor of Germany, Merz has sworn to "uphold and defend the constitution" ("das Grundgesetz [...] wahren und verteidigen"), as set out in article 56 of that same constitution, just like Olaf Scholz, the previous Chancellor of Germany, had.) He believes this would send a signal that would lead to less irregular migration. In a 2024 debate about the capacity to accept refugees into Germany, Merz referred to the statement by Saxony's Minister-President Michael Kretschmer, who had spoken out in favour of accepting a maximum of 60,000–100,000 refugees per year. Merz explained that Kretschmer's statement roughly describes "what we can still achieve today with our integration power".

Merz's CDU seeks to speed up visa processing for foreign skilled workers.

In October 2023, following the October 7 attacks by Hamas on Israel, Merz said Germany could not accept Palestinian refugees from Gaza, stating, "We have enough antisemitic young men in the country". In December 2024, Merz called for deportations of illegal Syrian immigrants to Syria and a freeze on new admissions of refugees. As chancellor, he aims to "regularly deport" people to Afghanistan and Syria.

Referring to the fact that around 80 percent of the 200,000 applicants for naturalization in 2024 wanted to keep their first citizenship, Merz intends to abolish the fast naturalization (which made it possible for applicants to obtain German citizenship after living in Germany for three to five years) that the traffic light coalition implemented in 2024. Weeks before the 2025 election, he also advocated for a denaturalization (which would require an amendment to the basic law) in cases in which those with multiple citizenship commit crimes after obtaining German citizenship.

After the January 2025 Aschaffenburg stabbing attack, perpetrated by an Afghan migrant who had no residence permits in Germany (and after a series of similar attacks within a few years), Merz called the EU asylum rules – the Dublin, Schengen, and Eurodac agreements – "visibly dysfunctional", stating "Germany must, therefore, make use of its right to the primacy of national law". He announced that under his leadership "there will be fundamental changes to the right of entry, asylum and residence in the Federal Republic of Germany". Merz said that if he were elected chancellor, on the first day of his term in office, he would instruct the Federal Ministry of the Interior to "permanently control the German state borders", and, "to reject all attempts at illegal entry without exception". There would be "a de facto ban on entry into the Federal Republic of Germany for anyone who does not have valid entry documents". He announced a tightening of detention for departure and deportation, and he wants more powers for the federal police. Regarding that, the federal police would be given the right to apply for arrest warrants. Those required to leave the country would no longer be allowed to move freely within the country, and the number of places for deportation detention would increase rapidly.

In November 2026, Merz stated that immigrants - including Muslim immigrants - who do not accept Germany's responsibility for the Holocaust should leave the country.

=== Social policy ===
Merz opposed the Bürgergeld (unemployment payment) and, like the CDU, wants to see it abolished and replaced by another system called New Basic Security. The trade union ver.di described CDU plans for basic security as "inhumane and unconstitutional". Merz wants to altogether cancel unemployment payments to those who could work but do not. According to Merz, there are 1.7 million recipients who meet that definition.

Merz has been accused of veering between inclusive rhetoric and dog whistling. On a TV talk show, he said that female teachers in German schools were experiencing a lack of respect from "little pashas", apparently referring to sons of Muslim parents, and allegedly made "xenophobic" remarks calling rejected asylum seekers "social tourists" who come to Germany to "get their teeth done". Weeks before, Merz had referred to some Ukrainian refugees as "welfare tourists" and said that many had come to Germany seeking safety, only to then travel back and forth between both countries after securing social benefits, remarks that he later said he regretted. Merz had also complained about "problems with foreigners" and insisted on a German Leitkultur (lit. 'lead culture'), a term that many argue calls for compulsory assimilation. In the 1990s, Merz was in the minority even in his conservative CDU when he voted against liberalizing Germany's abortion laws, against preimplantation genetic diagnosis and criminalizing marital rape.

=== Foreign policy ===
==== General stance ====
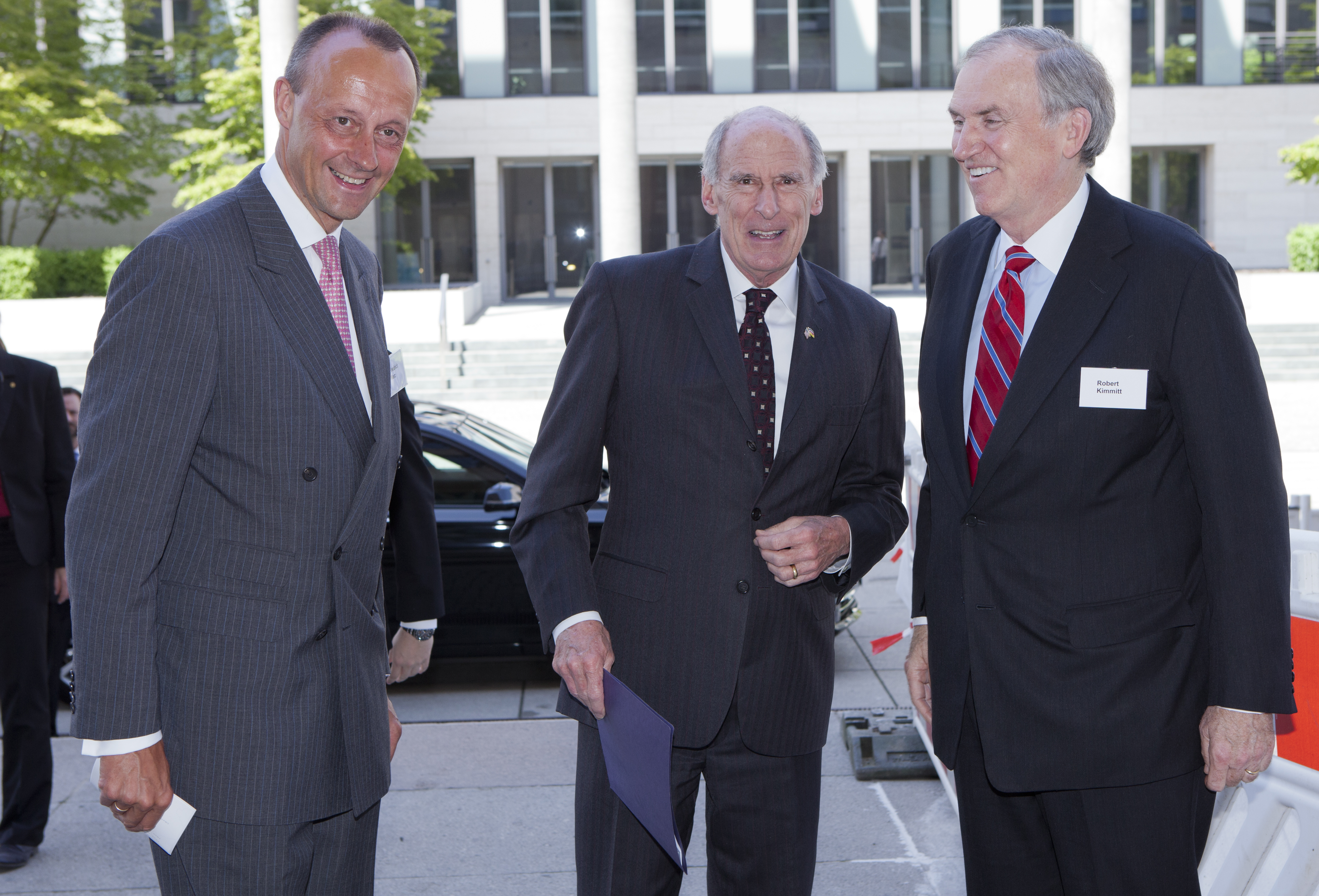
Merz with Dan Coats and Robert M. Kimmitt at the German–American Conference in Berlin in May 2017

Merz is a staunch supporter of the European Union, NATO and the liberal international order. In 2018, he described himself as "a truly convinced European, a convinced transatlanticist, and a German open to the world" and said that "I stand for a cosmopolitan Germany whose roots lie in Christian ethics and the European Enlightenment and whose most important political allies are the democracies of the West. I gladly use this expression again: The democracies of the West". He advocates a closer union and especially closer relations between Germany and France. In 2018, he co-authored an article in defence of the European project, which among other things called for "an army for Europe".

Merz is known for hawkish stances on authoritarian countries, in particular Russia and China. In 2023, Merz called for Germany to involve key allies, especially France, in negotiations with China as part of a rethinking of ties with the country that reflected a global "paradigm shift" in security and foreign policy. He called China "an increasing threat to [German] security", and criticized Scholz's decision to allow China's COSCO to take a stake in the port of Hamburg.

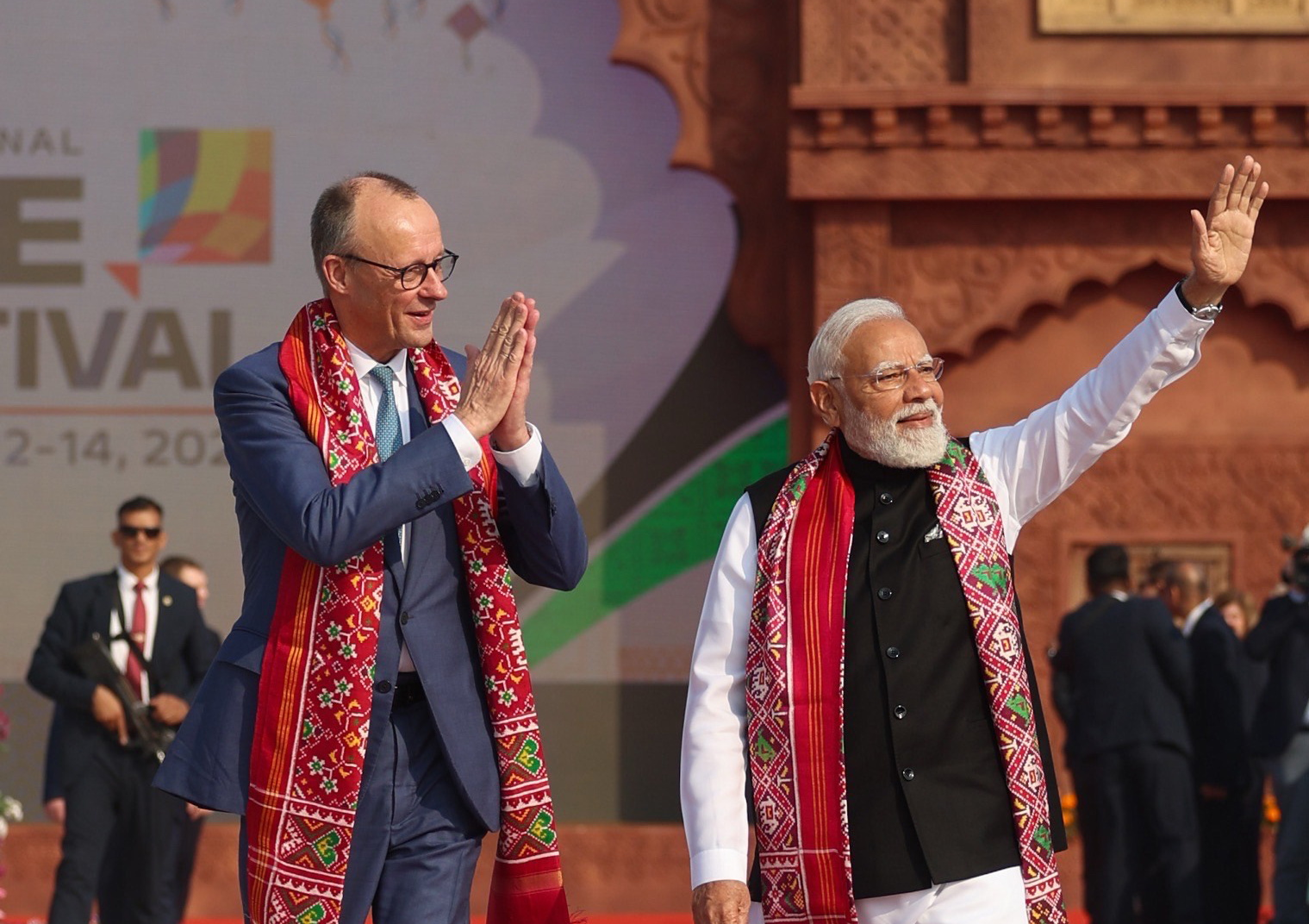
Merz with Indian Prime Minister Narendra Modi in Ahmedabad, Gujarat, 12 January 2026

In February 2025, Merz said that Germany would negotiate with France and the United Kingdom about extending their nuclear umbrella to Germany. Merz said, "We need to have discussions with both the British and the French—the two European nuclear powers—about whether nuclear sharing, or at least nuclear security from the U.K. and France, could also apply to us". The move to reconvene the old Bundestag were criticized. Merz received international support for the financial package from NATO Secretary General Mark Rutte and EU Commission President Ursula von der Leyen.

In January 2026, Merz condemned Venezuelan President Nicolás Maduro following the U.S. military raid on Caracas. He reaffirmed that Germany does not recognize Maduro's presidency, characterizing the most recent Venezuelan elections as "rigged".

==== United States ====
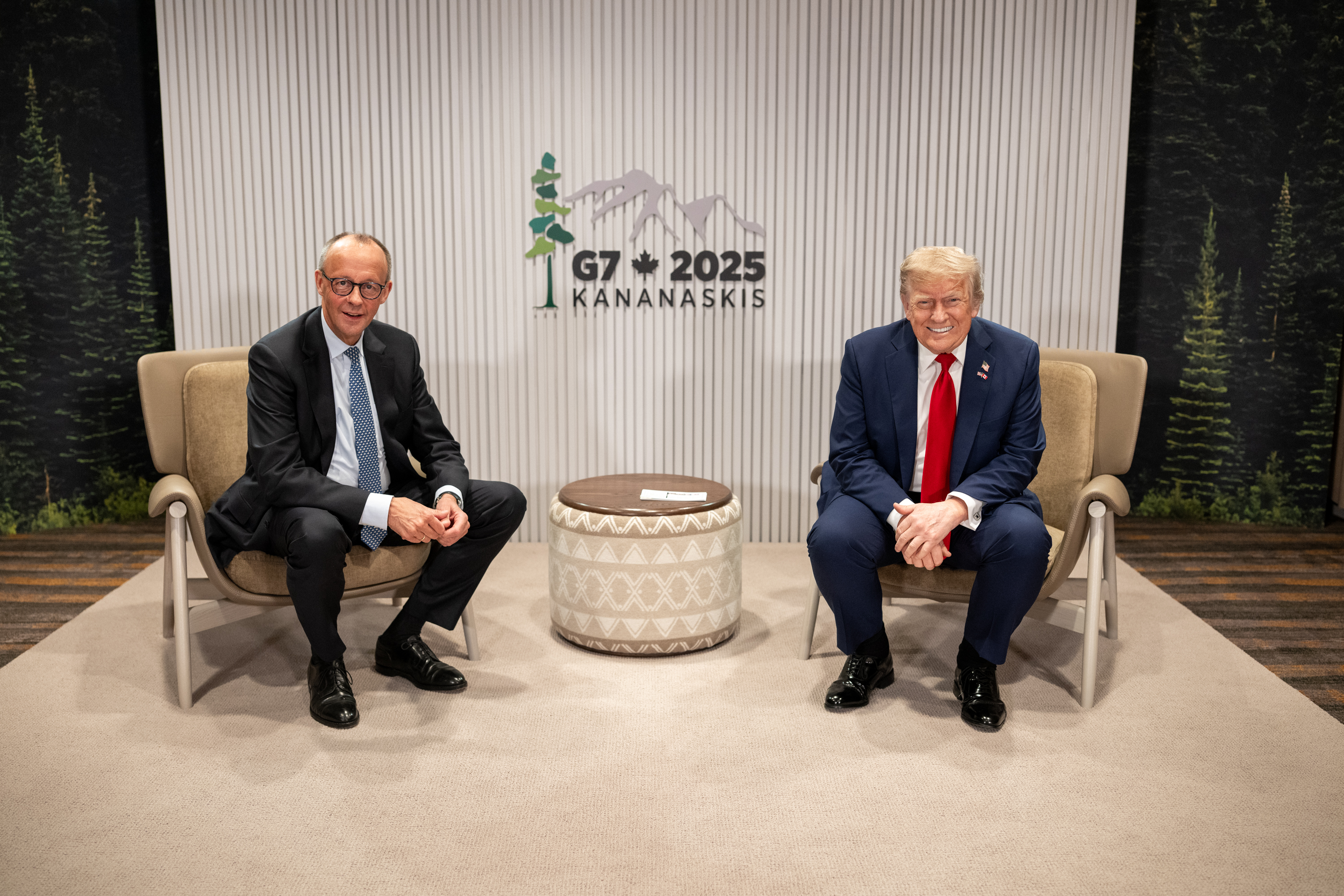
US President Donald Trump and Friedrich Merz at the 51st G7 summit in Canada, 16 June 2025

Formerly regarded as one of Germany’s most pro-American politicians and "exceptionally pro-American for a European leader", Merz previously served as chairman of the Atlantik-Brücke association, which promotes German-American friendship and Atlanticism. He has cited former U.S. President Ronald Reagan as a role model and has visited the United States more than 100 times.

However, under his chancellorship Merz has displayed open personal hostility toward the United States. He has repeatedly and sharply criticized American trade policy, particularly the Trump administration's tariffs on European goods, which he has described as hostile and damaging to transatlantic relations. Merz has gone further than Angela Merkel in his condemnations of U.S. economic actions.

In fall of 2024, he said he would try to make Germany "a little more independent from the U.S.", explaining that the United States was "in election mode" and "not the regulatory power that we were actually used to". He has warned that Europe must urgently strengthen its own defenses and potentially prepare alternatives to NATO within months if American commitment wanes.

Merz has stated that Germany "must go from being a sleeping middle power to becoming a leading middle power again" and that Germany "never really articulated and enforced its interests well enough". While speaking of seeking mutually beneficial arrangements that "Trump would call it a deal", his overall approach has been confrontational. In January 2025 he said regarding the United States, "We Europeans must be united [...] and those who travel to Washington must not only represent their own interests but the interests of the whole European Union".

Merz has stated that Europe must urgently strengthen its own defenses and potentially prepare alternatives to NATO within months if American commitment wanes, and has strongly criticized U.S. public officials commentating on elections in Europe, comparing it to Russian election interference. He has stressed the need for a united European front in dealings with Washington, arguing that Europeans must speak with one voice rather than pursue individual deals. Merz has also made notably disparaging remarks about American society, stating he would not advise his own children to study or work in the U.S. due to its "social climate".

While occasionally stating that Europe should still try to "keep the Americans on our side" because it cannot fully replace U.S. security contributions, his overall tone has been markedly hostile. This marks a sharp departure from his earlier image as an unconditional Atlanticist toward a relationship defined by distrust, repeated criticism of U.S. foreign and trade policy, and aggressive demands for European strategic autonomy.

==== Russia and its invasion of Ukraine ====
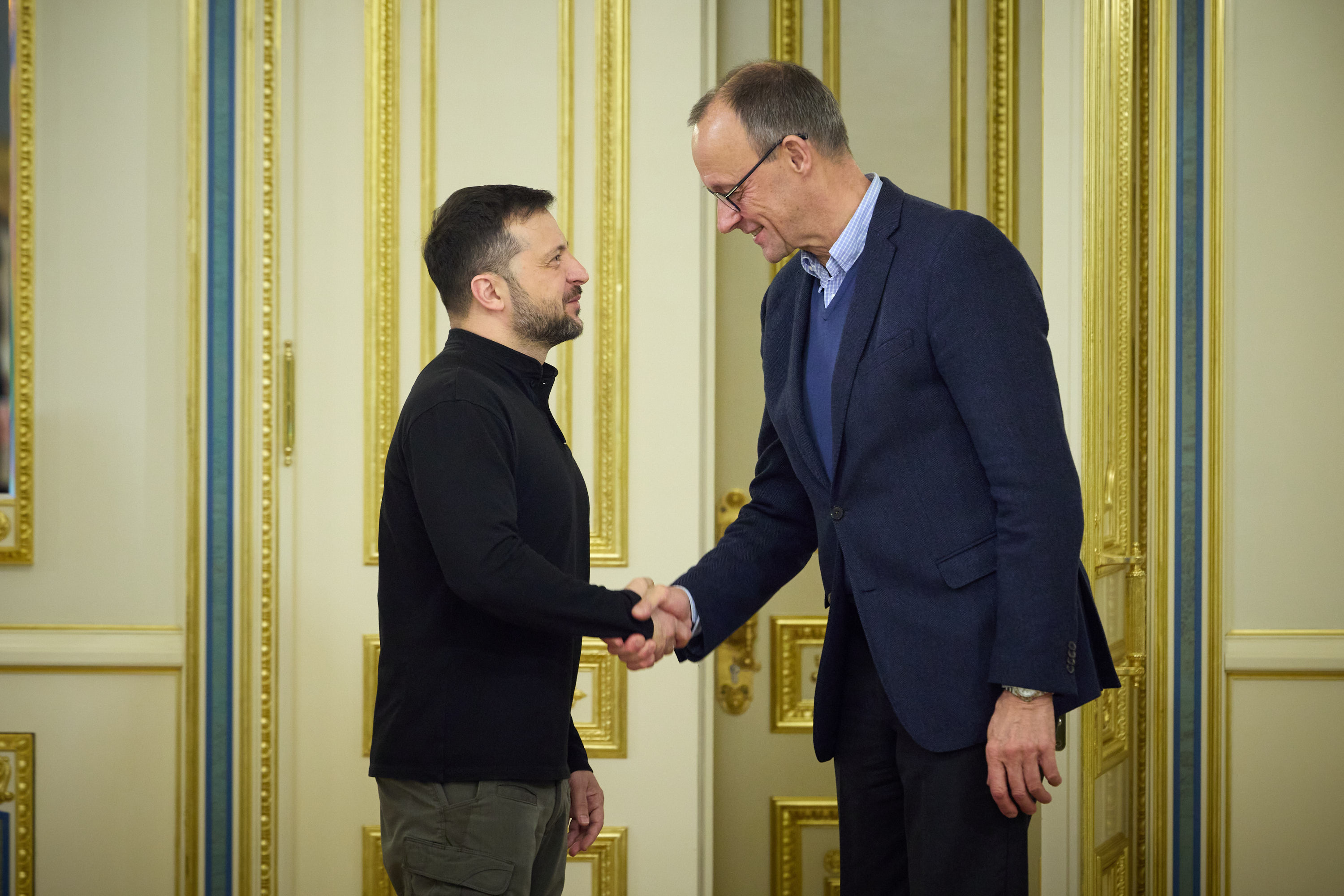
Merz with Ukrainian President Volodymyr Zelenskyy in Kyiv, Ukraine, on 9 December 2024

Following the start of the 2022 Russian invasion of Ukraine, Merz adopted strong pro-Ukrainian and anti-Russian positions, urging Chancellor Olaf Scholz to supply Ukraine with weapons and personally travelling to Kyiv in May to meet Ukrainian President Volodymyr Zelenskyy.

While Merz, as opposition leader, had demanded that the German government of Scholz deliver German Taurus cruise missiles to Ukraine, he himself said that he would not necessarily deliver Taurus cruise missiles if he were chancellor. As chancellor, he would provide them if Russia or Vladimir Putin did not comply with Germany's and other European countries' request to stop attacks on civilian infrastructure in Ukraine and on the condition that France and Great Britain, for their part, lift the range limitation on the weapons they delivered to Ukraine. Merz said he would, as chancellor, try to bring about a European decision on the question of whether to allow Ukraine to strike against targets deep within Russian territory with Western weapons. He said he would also signal Putin his willingness to talk beforehand. In December 2024 he said that Germany is letting Ukraine fight with one arm strapped on its back. Germany should instead give Ukraine the possibility to defend itself effectively with weapons from Germany. In May 2025, Merz supported purchasing long-range missiles for Ukraine, adding that there were "no more range limitations for weapons delivered to Ukraine" from Germany; this change was seen by Politico as allowing Taurus missiles to be delivered to Ukraine in the future. He added that "Ukraine has the right to use the weapons it receives, even beyond its own borders, against military targets on Russian territory".

In April 2026, Merz met with Ukrainian President Zelenskyy to sign a bilateral defense pact, during which he stated that Berlin would actively support Kyiv's efforts to address the Ukrainian conscription crisis. He pledged German cooperation in limiting the exodus of military-age men subject to the 2022 Ukrainian mobilization and facilitating their return, emphasizing their necessity for Ukraine's defense and future reconstruction.

==== Conflicts in the Middle East ====
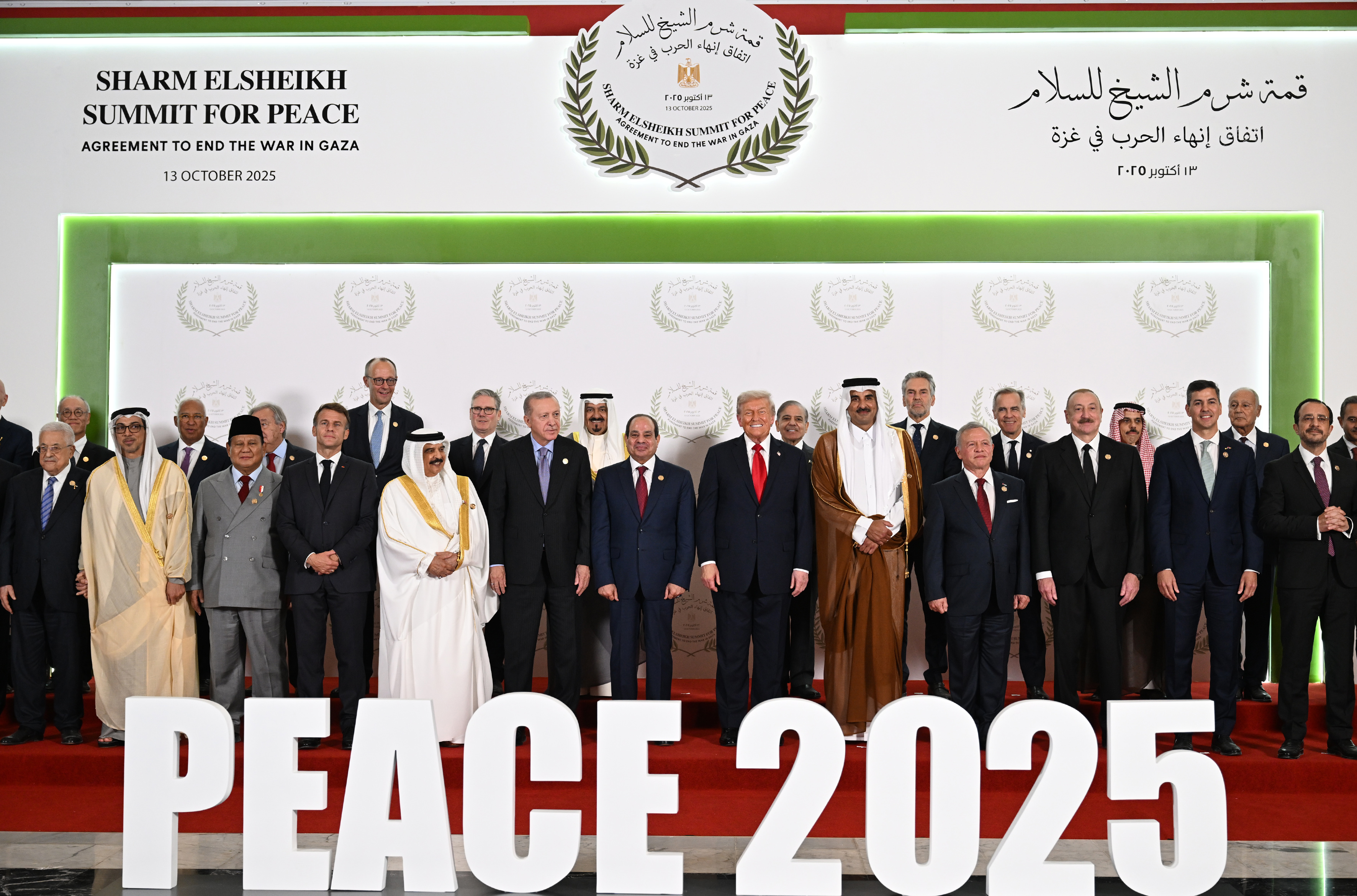
Merz at the Gaza peace summit in Sharm El Sheikh, Egypt, 13 October 2025

Merz is a staunch supporter of Israel. However, after he was elected chancellor he has expressed "serious concern about Israel's actions in the Gaza Strip". He does not see any role for Germany as a mediator in the Israeli–Palestinian conflict. However, Merz has opined that the "two-state solution remains the right long-term goal for peaceful coexistence between Israelis and Palestinians. The Palestinians' recognition of Israel's right to exist is a basic prerequisite on the way there".

In 2023, he said, in response to the United States' admonition to Israel to abide by international law, the U.S. had a different relationship to Israel than Germany, and that Germany has an obligation to help the country "without ifs and buts". In October 2024, Merz successfully urged the German government to resume weapons deliveries to Israel, including spare parts for tanks. He proposed stripping dual nationals of their German citizenship for protesting against Israel.

In September 2024, Merz criticized the International Criminal Court's (ICC) decision to issue an arrest warrant for Israeli Prime Minister Benjamin Netanyahu for alleged war crimes during the Gaza war.

In December 2024, after the fall of the Assad regime in Syria, Merz called on Europe to strengthen its ties with Turkey "to bring political pacification to this region".

In February 2025, one day after the 2025 German federal election, he announced his will to invite Netanyahu to Germany, "as an open challenge" to the decision of the ICC. In May 2025, Merz changed his tone, saying he no longer understands Israel's policy in Gaza.

Following the Israeli military strikes on Iran on 13 June 2025, Merz stressed that "the goal must remain that Iran cannot develop nuclear weapons", and reaffirmed Israel's "right to defend its existence and the security of its citizens." Merz declared in an interview to the German public television network ZDF on 17 June 2025, on the sidelines of the G7 summit in Canada, that "This is the dirty work that Israel is doing for all of us." On 23 June 2025, Merz voiced support for U.S. military strikes on Iranian nuclear sites.

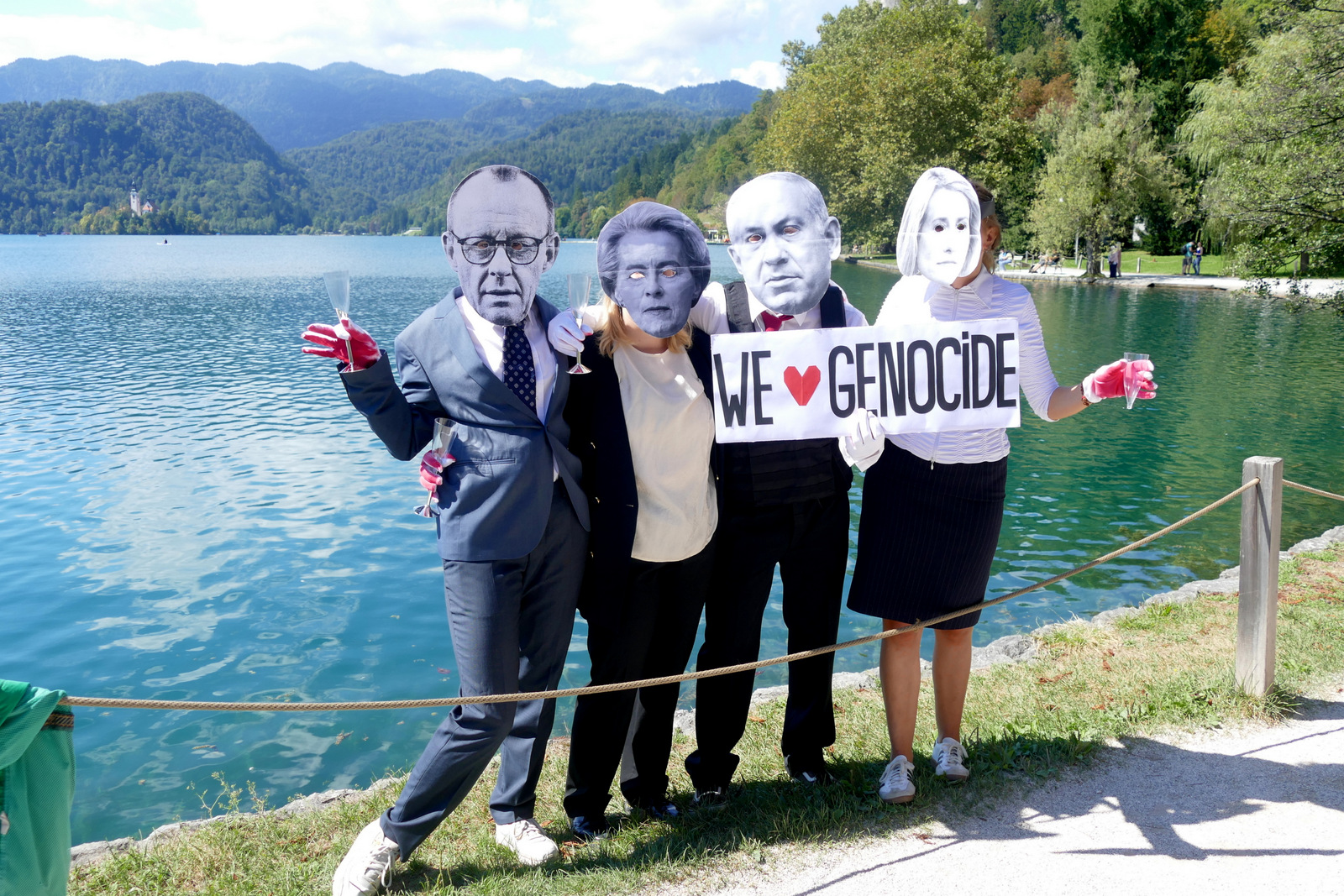
Protests in Slovenia on 1 September 2025, condemning the alleged involvement of Merz and other EU politicians in the Gaza genocide

In August 2025, Merz announced that Germany would not authorize any exports of military equipment to Israel that could be utilized in Gaza, citing the decision by Netanyahu's Cabinet to assume control of Gaza City and stating that the export restrictions would remain in place "until further notice." Merz's decision was criticized by some German politicians. In September 2025, Merz said that Germany stands "firmly" on Israel's side, but its military operations in Gaza are "disproportionate". He also stated that Germany does not plan and is opposed to recognizing a Palestinian state, and does not consider the current situation of the Palestinian people under the ongoing Israeli invasion of the Gaza Strip to be a genocide.

In November 2025, Merz's government revoked the export restrictions on weapons intended for use in Gaza. In early December 2025, Merz visited Israel and held talks with Prime Minister Benjamin Netanyahu and President Isaac Herzog. The discussions focused on solidifying German support for Israel, the ongoing Gaza conflict, the peace process, and a major arms deal.

In January 2026, Iranian Foreign Minister Abbas Araghchi engaged in a diplomatic dispute with Merz concerning Iran's domestic protests and the conflict in Gaza. Merz condemned the Iranian regime’s "brutal violence" against protesters, characterizing the crackdown as a "sign of weakness" and asserting that the regime was in its "final days." In response, Araghchi argued that Germany's credibility on human rights and international law had been "obliterated" by its support for Israel's military actions in Gaza.

Following the start of the 2026 Iran War in late February 2026, Merz stated that the German government had been informed of the US and Israeli operations against Iran in advance. On 28 February, he issued a joint statement with UK Prime Minister Keir Starmer and French President Emmanuel Macron condemning Iran's retaliatory strikes against regional countries. On 1 March, Merz characterized the Iranian government as a "terrorist regime" responsible for decades of internal oppression, stating that its nuclear and missile programmes posed a threat to regional peace and security, it was responsible for the activities of Hamas and Hezbollah, and it had repeatedly threatened Israel's existence. He added that Germany shares the goal of the United States and Israel to end its "terror". Merz further approved of the U.S. attacks on Iran, declaring that Germany is on the "same page" with the United States regarding the latter's plan to eliminate the Iranian regime.

=== Energy policy ===
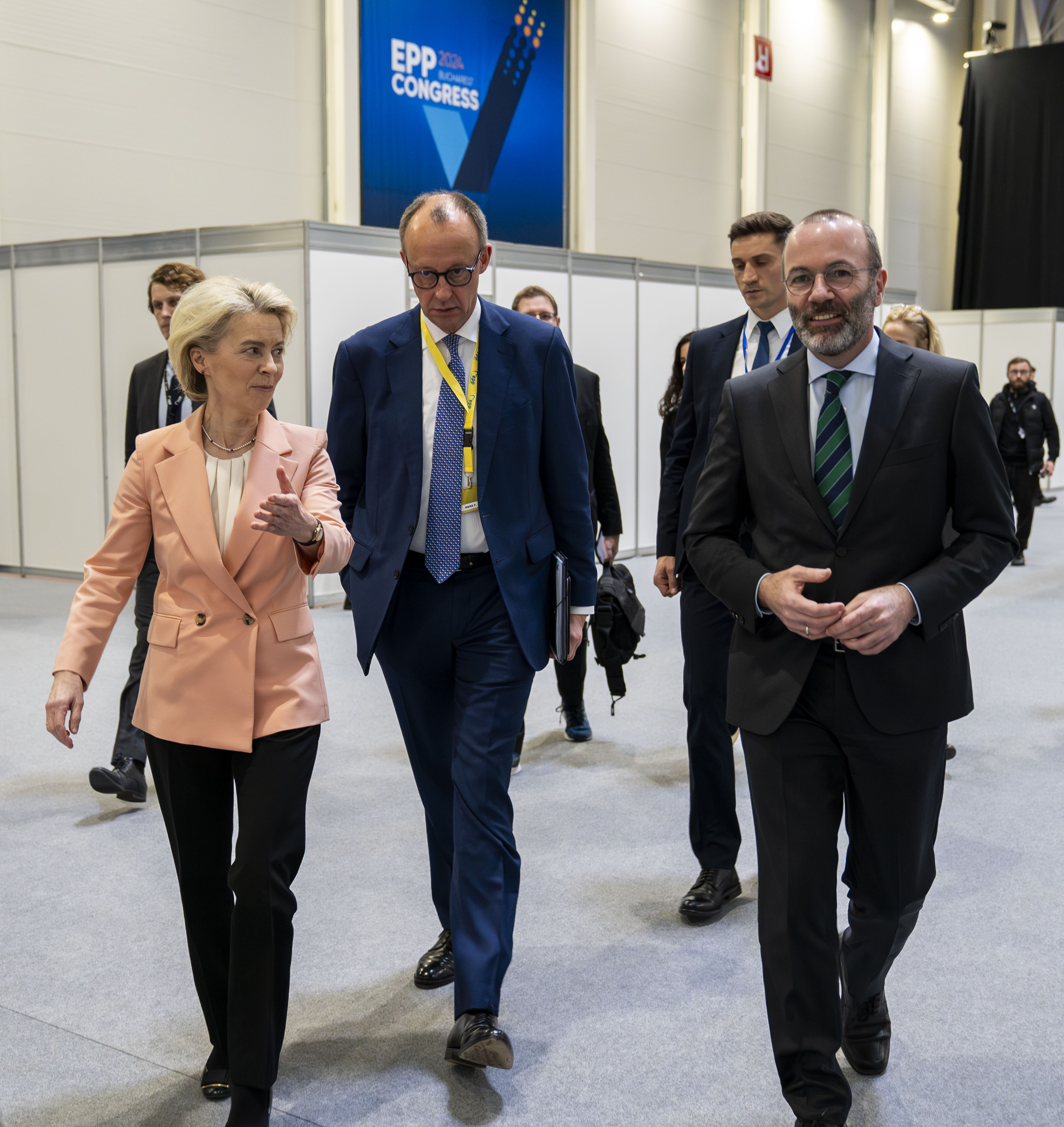
Merz, Ursula von der Leyen and Manfred Weber at the European People's Party Congress in Bucharest in 2024

Merz called the phase-out of nuclear power in Germany a "grave strategic mistake".

=== Environmental policy ===
In April 2023, Merz declared that everyone in the CDU takes the issue of climate change very seriously. However, he went on to claim that the issue of climate change is overrated in the political debate and that the German population does not see the problem as significant as politicians do. Merz went on to deny that time is running out for successful climate change measures and that the country will be on the right track if it makes the right decisions over the next decade.

In 2023, Merz opposed the proposed EU phase-out of fossil fuel vehicles and hybrid vehicles by 2035, stating that the fight for net-zero emissions "must be achieved with technology and open-mindedness, not bans".

In late 2024, Volkswagen announced plans to close at least three German factories and lay off tens of thousands of employees. Merz argued that the Scholz government's emphasis on electromobility contributed to the crisis at Volkswagen.

Merz supports a business-friendly adaptation of the European Green Deal.

=== Approach towards the AfD ===
In November 2018, he reiterated that the CDU must clearly distance itself from the Alternative for Germany (AfD), reiterating allegations that the latter is openly Nazist and has antisemitic undertones. In 2019, he said it was right for the CDU to refuse co-operation with the AfD. However, in the same year Merz spoke in favour of a "more calm approach" to the AfD: "I would have long since elected an AfD vice president in the Bundestag (federal parliament). [...] This party was elected with 12.6 percent. It has neither been banned nor classified as unconstitutional. It has millions of voters behind it who should not be made to play the victim". In December 2021, shortly before taking over the party chairmanship, he said: "The state associations [of the CDU], especially in the east, are getting a crystal clear message from us: If anyone raises a hand to work with the AfD, then a party exclusion procedure will take place the next day". However, Merz did not take action against the steadily increasing local cooperation between CDU politicians and AfD politicians from the following year onwards, partially due to the AfD's rising electoral performance. In June 2023, he declared that cooperation between the two parties would only be prohibited in "legislative bodies", by which he meant the EU, federal and state levels. A month later, after being criticized over an apparent failure to implement his "announcement" from December 2021, he reiterated his differentiation regarding political levels and said that in local parliaments, "of course [...] we must look for ways to jointly shape the city, the state and the district". Merz was criticized by large parts of his own party, who feared a crumbling of the firewall against the far right. Minister-President of Saxony, Michael Kretschmer (CDU), however, declared that a refusal of cross-party cooperation in substantive decisions at the local level was not sustainable in a democracy. In June 2023, Merz retracted his promise in 2018 to halve the AfD, saying that his party in the opposition could not halve the AfD if the government counteracted by "strengthening it" with its policies.

Before the federal election, Merz repeatedly ruled out any possibility of a coalition between CDU and AfD. Merz passionately stated in early January 2025, that under his leadership "there won't be a cooperation between the CDU and the AfD" – stating that the CDU would "sell its soul" in doing so – and that he "ties his destiny as party chairman" to this commitment. The CDU later that month, after a deadly knife attack perpetrated by an Afghan migrant, who had no residence permit, issued a motion regarding migration into the federal parliament, which attained a majority due to the AfD voting alongside the CDU. With this motion, Merz ignored his own proposal, that he uttered in November 2024, to only put questions to the vote that would find a majority without the AfD. Merz claimed that the Union has "not spoken to the AfD, does not discuss things with them", or "compare texts", but that it proposes what it "believes to be right in the matter", insisting that putting a motion to a vote in the Bundestag did not constitute co-operation with the AfD. The Bundestag went on to reject the CDU's proposed legislation a few days later, largely due to a dozen CDU legislators abstaining, a decision seen to be sparked by the AfD-related controversy.

After the Federal Office for the Protection of the Constitution (BfV), Germany's domestic intelligence agency, classified the federal branch of the AfD as a "confirmed right-wing extremist endeavour" just days before Merz' election as Chancellor of Germany, Merz announced that his government will analyse the expert opinion by the BfV on the AfD before deciding how to proceed.

=== Secondary activities as a member of federal parliament ===
Merz has been known for his many secondary jobs over several legislative periods. As a member of the Bundestag (federal parliament of Germany), Merz had a total of 18 secondary jobs in the 14th legislative period (2002–2005) and at least 11 secondary jobs in the 15th legislative period (2005–2009). In 2006 alone, Merz was represented on the boards of eight different companies. In 2007, Manager Magazine wrote about Merz's secondary jobs:

Merz probably earns a nice six-figure sum annually for his work in the law firm. For the year 2006, a conservative estimate shows that Merz's additional income, apart from his lawyer's salary, amounts to a quarter of a million euros.

His many secondary activities raised concerns over whether Merz takes his mandate as a member of the Bundestag seriously and thoroughly. In 2007, Merz wrote a letter to his voters in an attempt to defend himself against criticism of his secondary activities.

In 2021, before the federal election and 12 years after he left the Bundestag in 2009, Merz announced that he would no longer pursue any "professional activities outside of politics" if he were to be re-elected to the Bundestag.

=== Lawsuit against disclosure of additional income ===
In 2005, the law was amended to require the public disclosure of income from secondary activities of members of parliament. Merz reportedly had 18, 11, or, according to the management of the Bundestag, 14 secondary activities in addition to his parliamentary work. Together with eight other members of the Bundestag, Merz filed a lawsuit against the disclosure of their secondary income at the Federal Constitutional Court. Among other arguments, the plaintiffs claimed that the disclosure requirement would encourage MPs to pursue career politics, potentially distancing them from real-life experiences. In July 2007, the Federal Constitutional Court rejected the lawsuit in two parts. It ruled unanimously that the political mandate must be central to parliamentary activities. In a tied 4–4 vote, it upheld the disclosure requirement and enforcement mechanism, arguing that transparency to voters about potential conflicts of interest ensures the independence of the Bundestag.

=== Millionaire and middle-class debate ===
In November 2018, when asked in an interview with the tabloid media Bild, Merz said that he was a millionaire (without distinguishing between income and wealth millionaires) and thus would belong in his understanding to the upper middle class. He later specified that he, at that time, earned "around one million euros gross" per year. These statements met with a broad public pushback and sparked wider criticism in Germany. Journalists, economists and financial advisors in Germany placed Merz in the upper class. According to the German Federal Bank, at the time in question, a total net worth of over €722,000 put an individual in the top 5 percent of the German population by wealth. Merz's private assets include real estate and two aircraft.

=== LGBT+ people ===
Merz has made statements about LGBT+ people that have been perceived as insensitive. When asked in 2001 about Berlin's then mayor Klaus Wowereit coming out as gay, he said "as long as he doesn't come near me, I don't care". In November 2018, Merz said that introducing same-sex marriage in Germany was the right thing to do. In September 2020, Merz was asked if he would have reservations about a gay chancellor, and said "concerning the question of sexual orientation, as long as it is within the scope of the law and does not concern children—at this point I reach my absolute limits—it is not an issue for public discussion". He clarified after an outcry that he had not meant to link homosexuality with pedophilia.

=== Post-war expulsions and Beneš decrees ===
During his tenure as the chairman of the CDU/CSU parliamentary group from 2000 to 2002, Merz adopted a highly critical stance toward the Beneš decrees and the post-war expulsion of Germans from Czechoslovakia.

In the context of the upcoming 2004 enlargement of the European Union, Merz actively argued that Czechoslovakia's decrees, which stripped ethnic Germans of citizenship and property, were discriminatory and conflicted with European values of human rights. Speaking in the Bundestag in 2002, Merz asserted that if European legal experts concluded that the Beneš decrees maintained a discriminatory effect, "then these decrees must be eliminated from the world, because Europe is a community of laws and values."

Merz has regularly participated in events organized by the Federation of Expellees (Bund der Vertriebenen, BdV) and has emphasized the importance of commemorating the fate of German expellees. Speaking as the keynote speaker at the BdV's annual reception on 9 April 2024, he praised the historical integration of expellees into post-war Germany, while maintaining a regular political dialogue with the federation's leadership regarding the interests of Heimatvertriebene and ethnic German repatriates.

=== Internet privacy ===
In February 2026 Merz called for a mandatory usage of real names on the Internet: "I want to see real names on the internet. I want to know who is speaking out. In politics, we also engage in debates in our society using our real names and with complete transparency. Then I expect the same from everyone else who critically examines our country and our society."

== Other activities ==
- Deutsche Nationalstiftung, Member of the Senate
- Peace of Westphalia Prize, Member of the Jury
- Bayer Foundation for German and International Labour and Business Law, Member of the Board of Trustees (1998–2002)
- KfW, Member of the supervisory board (2003–2004)
- Ludwig Erhard Foundation, Member (1998–2005)

== Personal life ==
Merz is married to judge Charlotte Merz (née Gass). They have three children together and reside in Arnsberg in the Sauerland region. He is the first chancellor in 27 years (since Helmut Kohl) to have biological children (although Gerhard Schröder adopted a daughter from Russia in July 2004). Their son, born in 1981, holds a doctorate in philosophy, their elder daughter is a physician, and their younger daughter is a lawyer. Merz has seven grandchildren. In 2005, Merz and his wife established the Friedrich und Charlotte Merz Stiftung, a foundation supporting projects in the education sector. A keen aviator, Merz holds a private pilot licence and, until 2026 owned a twin‑engined Diamond DA62 aircraft, which he sold, citing his full timetable as chancellor as a reason that prevents him from flying regularly. In addition to his native language, Merz also speaks English and French.

In 2018, Merz rejected the Ludwig Erhard Prize, citing objections to publications by the chairman of the Ludwig Erhard Foundation, Roland Tichy, considered by some to be on the extreme right.

== Book ==
- Merz, Friedrich (2008). Mehr Kapitalismus wagen: Wege zu einer gerechten Gesellschaft (in German). Munich: Piper Verlag. ISBN 978-3-492-05157-6. LCCN 2010514604. OCLC 634130092. OL 24354103M. Wikidata Q130425553.

== See also ==
- List of current heads of state and government
- List of heads of the executive by approval rating

== Notes ==
Political offices
Preceded by Wolfgang Schäuble	Leader of the Opposition; 2000–2002	Succeeded by Angela Merkel
Preceded by Ralph Brinkhaus	Leader of the Opposition; 2022–2025	Succeeded by Alice Weidel
Preceded by Olaf Scholz	Chancellor of Germany; 2025–present	Incumbent
Party political offices
Preceded by Wolfgang Schäuble	Leader of the CDU/CSU in the Bundestag; 2000–2002	Succeeded by Angela Merkel
Preceded by Ralph Brinkhaus	Leader of the CDU/CSU in the Bundestag; 2022–2025	Succeeded by Jens Spahn
Preceded by Armin Laschet	Leader of the Christian Democratic Union; 2022–present	Incumbent
Order of precedence
Preceded by Julia Klöckner as President of the Bundestag	Order of precedence in Germany; Chancellor	Succeeded by Andreas Bovenschulte as President of the Bundesrat
