= Ludwig Erhard Foundation =

German policy organization

Ludwig Erhard Foundation Ludwig-Erhard-Stiftung e.V.
- Named after: Ludwig Erhard
- Formation: 1967
- Legal status: Non-profit foundation
- Headquarters: Bonn
- Members: 75
- Chair: Roland Koch
- Website: www.ludwig-erhard.de

The Ludwig Erhard Foundation (Ludwig-Erhard-Stiftung e.V.) is a public policy organization founded in 1967 by West German ex-Chancellor Ludwig Erhard in Bonn.

The foundation states that it aims to serve "the further development and strengthening of the Social market economy" through publications, talks and public events. The organization's charter states that its task is to promote "principles of liberty in politics and economy through civil education both inside and outside of Germany, as well as scientific work in the subject areas of economics and regulatory policy." The foundation states its overarching goal to be "freedom and responsibility as the foundation of the economic and social structure for the empowered citizen."

The foundation is funded through proceeds from its endowment, voluntary membership fees and donations. The foundation is not required to publish a yearly record of its budget.

== Structure ==
The current chairman of the board is Roland Koch.

The other members of the board are Ulrich Blum, Godelieve Quisthoudt-Rowohl, Sarna Röser, Joachim Seeler, Linda Teuteberg, and Nicolaus Heinen (treasurer). The membership of the organization is limited to a maximum of 75, excepting honorary members.

== Prizes awarded by the foundation ==
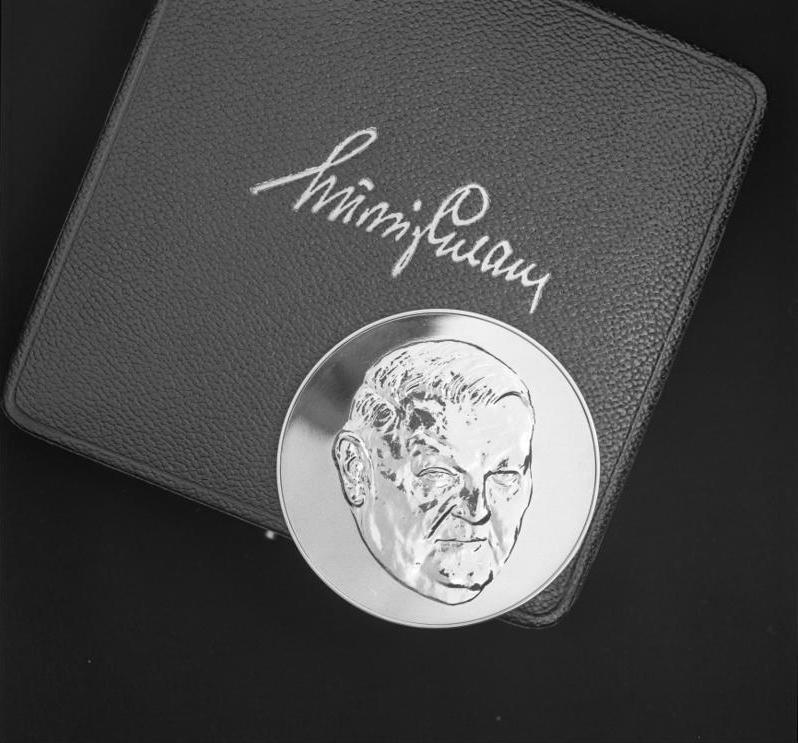
The Ludwig Erhard Medal awarded to Alfred Müller-Armack in 1976

The Ludwig Erhard Medal for Service to the Social Market Economy (Ludwig-Erhard-Medaille für Verdienste um die Soziale Marktwirtschaft) is awarded by the foundation to "men and women [...], who have made exemplary contributions to the health, preservation and development of the Social Market Economy or to the principles thereof."

The Ludwig Erhard Prize for Publications in Economics (Ludwig-Erhard-Preis für Wirtschaftspublizistik) has the goal of "promoting information and discussion of the Social Market Economy." Since 1991, it has been awarded specifically to journalists, economists and others under the age of 35. The ten-member jury is composed partially of former awardees.

== Controversies ==
In 2018, Friedrich Merz rejected the Ludwig Erhard Prize, based on objections to the publications of the chairman of the board of the Ludwig Erhard Foundation, Roland Tichy. Critics describe Tichy's online magazine Tichys Einblick (Tichy's Insight) of right-wing extremism. Four members of the jury, Rainer Hank, Ulric Papendick, Nikolaus Piper and Ursula Weidenfeld, resigned following Merz' decision. The four accused Tichy of using the foundation to boost the reputation of his own publications. Two other members of the jury, Thomas Mayer und Frank Schäffler, spoke in support of Tichy. Schäffler saw "a struggle within Liberalism between supporters and opponents of Merkel's political course, both in the European debt crisis and in the migration debate."

On 23 September 2020, Dorothee Bär resigned from the foundation in protest against the chairperson Roland Tichy, whose online magazine Tichys Einblick had published an article about the state secretary of Berlin, Sawsan Chebli, that Bär viewed as sexist. Bär said that she can no longer support the foundation, as long as it has "a chairperson, under whose direction such articles can be published."

Following the controversy, German health minister Jens Spahn and the deputy chairperson of the CDU/CSU, Carsten Linnemann, announced that they were pausing their membership in the foundation. The next day, Tichy declared that he would step down at the end of his term as chairperson, at the end of October. Foundation member Jens Weidmann, who had expressed strong criticism of Tichy in a letter to the other members of the foundation, greeted Tichy's resignation, saying that Tichy's role as publicist was not compatible with his role as chairperson of the foundation.
