= Linda Teuteberg =

German lawyer and politician (born 1981)

Linda Teuteberg MdB
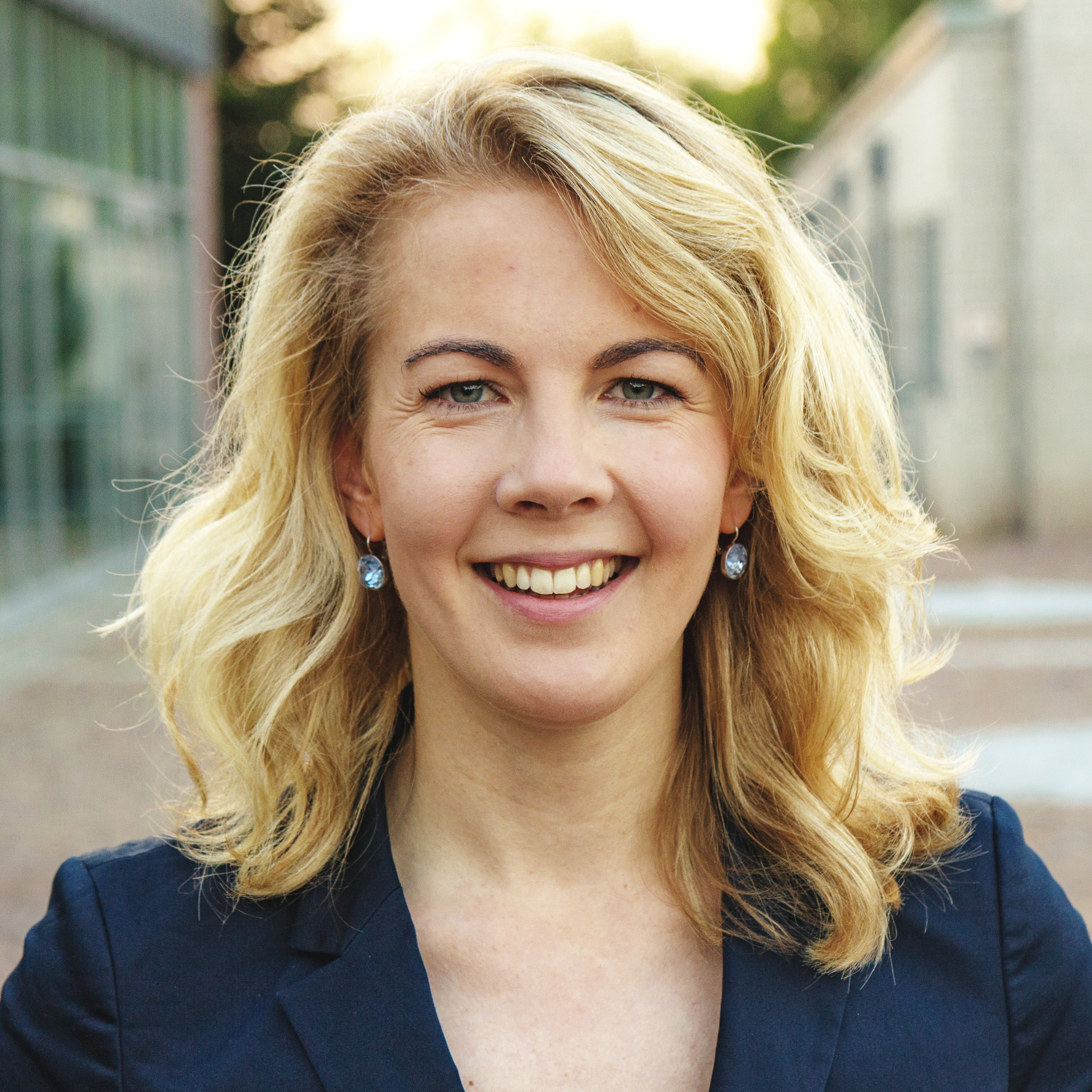
- Teuteberg in 2018

General Secretary of the Free Democratic Party
- In office 26 April 2019 – 19 September 2020
- Leader: Christian Lindner
- Preceded by: Nicola Beer
- Succeeded by: Volker Wissing

Leader of the Free Democratic Party in Brandenburg
- In office 30 November 2019 – 18 December 2021
- General Secretary: Anja Schwinghoff
- Deputy: Martin Neumann; Jeff Staudacher
- Preceded by: Axel Graf Bülow
- Succeeded by: Zyon Braun

Member of the Bundestag for Brandenburg
- In office 24 October 2017 – 2025
- Preceded by: Heinz Lafermann (2013)
- Constituency: Free Democratic Party List

Member of the Landtag of Brandenburg
- In office 21 October 2009 – 8 October 2014
- Preceded by: multi-member district
- Succeeded by: multi-member district
- Constituency: Free Democratic Party List

Personal details
- Born: Linda Merschin; 22 April 1981 (age 45) Königs Wusterhausen, East Germany (now Germany)
- Spouse: Björn Teuteberg
- Education: University of Potsdam
- Occupation: Politician; Lawyer
- Website: linda-teuteberg.de

Linda Teuteberg (née Merschin; born 22 April 1981) is a German lawyer and politician of the Free Democratic Party (FDP). Serving as a member of the Bundestag since 2017, she was elected as General Secretary of the FDP on 26 April 2019 and thereby became part of the party's leadership around chairman Christian Lindner. Lindner asked for and received her resignation effective 19 September 2020.

== Early life and education ==
Teuteberg was born Linda Merschin on 22 April 1981 in Königs Wusterhausen, East Germany and grew up in Görsdorf bei Storkow, Storkow, Brandenburg as the daughter of a teacher and an engineer. She graduated from the Katholischen Gymnasium Bernhardinum in Fürstenwalde and, on a scholarship from the Studienstiftung, studied jurisprudence and economics at the University of Potsdam.

== Political career ==
Teuteberg joined the Young Liberals in 1998 and became a member of FDP in 2000.

=== Career in state politics ===
Teuteberg was elected to the Landtag of Brandenburg on 27 September 2009 on the state list and was supported by Hans-Dietrich Genscher. Teuteberg served for five years. She participated in the 2012 German presidential election on 18 March 2012.

During her time in the state parliament, Teuteberg served on the Committee on Legal Affairs, the Committee on the Election of Judges and the Enquete Commission on the "consequences of the SED dictatorship and the transition to a democratic constitutional state in the Land of Brandenburg", and was alao a deputy member of the budget, finance, economy, European affairs and development policy committees. She was also her parliamentary group's spokesperson for legal and media affairs. She did not seek re-election in 2014.

From 2014 until 2017, Teuteberg worked at the Federal Ministry of Education and Research.

=== Member of the German Bundestag, 2017–2025 ===
In an internal vote in November 2016, Teuteberg defeated Axel Graf Bülow with 57% of votes to become the FDP lead candidate (German: Spitzenkandidatin) in Brandenburg for the 2017 German federal election. The FDP won 7.1% of the second votes (9.2% in Teuteberg's constituency) in Brandenburg. Teuteberg won 7.5% of the first votes.

From September 2017, Teuteberg was a member of the German Bundestag, where she served on the Committee on Internal Affairs. She was also her parliamentary group's spokesperson on migration policy.

In the negotiations to form a so-called traffic light coalition of the Social Democratic Party (SPD), the Green Party and the FDP following the 2021 federal elections, Teuteberg was part of her party's delegation in the working group on migration and integration, co-chaired by Boris Pistorius, Luise Amtsberg and Joachim Stamp.

== Other activities ==
- Federal Agency for Civic Education (BPB), Member of the Board of Trustees (since 2022)
- Ludwig Erhard Foundation, Member of the Board (since 2020)
- Bündnis für Demokratie und Toleranz, Member of the Advisory Board
- Federal Foundation for the Reappraisal of the SED Dictatorship, Member of the Board of Trustees
- Gegen Vergessen – Für Demokratie, Member of the Board
- Karl Hamann Foundation, Member of the Board of Trustees
- Quadriga Hochschule Berlin, Member of the advisory board on Politics and Public Affairs
- Stephanus-Stiftung, Member of the Board of Trustees

== Political positions ==
On the state level, the focus of Teuteberg's political work was the processing of the SED dictatorship and the reparation of the injustice caused in the GDR and the advocacy of a liberal economic policy. Teuteberg opposes the fact that municipal enterprises can compete with private companies and operate economically. Teuteberg campaigned for the University of Potsdam, which was to lose its law school according to plans of the Brandenburg state government.

Amid the emergence of the SARS-CoV-2 Omicron variant in Germany in late 2021, Teuteberg was one of 22 members of the FDP parliamentary group who advocated against the introduction of a COVID-19 vaccine mandate.

On July 19, 2025, Teuteberg called for defunding UNRWA.

== Personal life ==
Teuteberg is married to Björn Teuteberg, a member of the Potsdam city council. She is a member of the Evangelical Church in Berlin, Brandenburg and Silesian Upper Lusatia.
