= Roland Tichy =

German author, economist and journalist (born 1955)

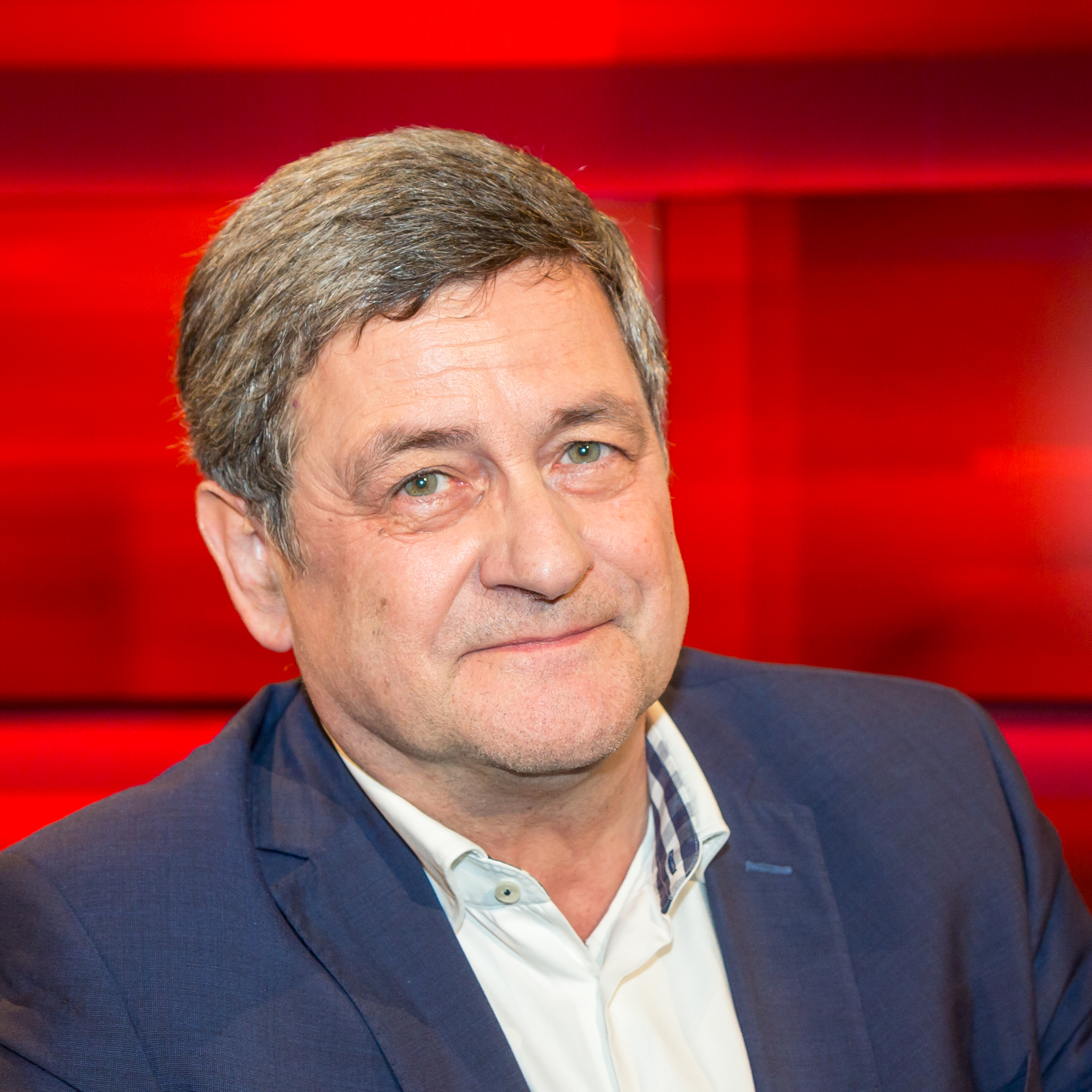
Tichy at German television hart aber fair

Roland Tichy (born 11 November 1955 in Bad Reichenhall) is a German author, economist and journalist. He is the publisher of conservative populistic magazine Tichys Einblick.

His positions include the relativization of man-made climate change and criticism about left-wing networks.

== Life ==
Tichy studied economics, politics and communication science at LMU Munich. After his studies, he was hired as an assistant by the department of economics at LMU Munich. From 1983 to 1985, he worked at the German Chancellery for Helmut Kohl. In the 1990s, Tichy joined the German company Daimler-Benz in the department of corporate issues management.

Tichy was editor-in-chief of the German magazines Impulse (1991–1995), Euro (2002–2007) and Wirtschaftswoche (2007–2014). In 2014 he became the CEO of the Ludwig Erhard Foundation and, since 2016, he has been the publisher of the monthly magazine Tichys Einblick. Tichy is a member of the neoliberal Mont Pelerin Society. He is married to Andrea Tichy.

In 2021 Tichy started a talkshow called "Tichys Ausblick" referring to "Tichys Einblick" on the right-leaning private TV-channel TV.Berlin. To launch, Tichy invited two guests who are popular with his readership: the conservative GDR revisionist comedian Uwe Steimle and former CDU politician and former president of the BfV Hans-Georg Maaßen.

== Memberships ==
- Stiftung Meinung und Freiheit e.V., chairmen (Vice-chairmen are Hans-Georg Maaßen and Alexander Mitsch, founding chair of Werteunion)
- Ludwig-Erhard-Stiftung, member, head of board until November 2020
- Aktionsgemeinschaft Soziale Marktwirtschaft, former board member
- Friedrich-August-von-Hayek-Stiftung, former member of curatorium
- Friedrich A. von Hayek – Gesellschaft, member
- Mont Pelerin Society, member

== Controversies ==
In the spring of 2017, Tichy took part in a campaign initiated by the Alternative for Germany (AfD) to denigrate the former bishop Margot Käßmann as a "racist". A quote from Käßmann, which was falsified by omissions, was used for this purpose.

== Publications ==
- Tichy, Roland (2013). Gesammelte Einblicke (in German). Frankfurt am Main: Quell Verlag. ISBN 978-3-9815402-2-2. OCLC 864647066.
- Tichy, Roland; Tichy, Andrea (2001). Die Pyramide steht Kopf die Wirtschaft in der Altersfalle und wie sie ihr entkommt (in German). München: Piper Taschenbuch. ISBN 978-3-492-04346-5. OCLC 248560702.
- Tichy, Roland; Dietl, Sylvia (2000). Deutschland einig Rundfunkland? : eine Dokumentation zur Wiedervereinigung des deutschen Rundfunksystems 1989-1991 (in German). München: R. Fischer. ISBN 3-88927-260-6. OCLC 45707854.
- Tichy, Roland (1998). Ab in die neue Mitte! : die Chancen der Globalisierung für eine deutsche Zukunftsgesellschaft (in German). Hamburg: Hoffmann und Campe. ISBN 3-455-11263-3. OCLC 40285149.
- Tichy, Roland (1990). Ausländer rein! Warum es kein "Ausländerproblem" gibt (in German). München: Piper. ISBN 978-3-492-10908-6. OCLC 243423292.

== Awards ==
- 2008: Ludwig Erhardt Award by Ludwig Erhard Foundation
- 2015: Hayek Medal by Friedrich Hayek Society
