= Tichys Einblick =

- Founder: Roland Tichy
- Founded: 2014
- Country: Germany
- Language: German
- Website: www.tichyseinblick.de

Tichys Einblick (English: Tichy's Insight) is a German news and opinion magazine published online since 2014 and in print since 2016. It was established by Roland Tichy.

Tichys Einblick's editorial line is categorized as right-wing and conservative, though it describes itself as liberal-conservative. It is considered one of the most prominent right-wing alternative media outlets in Germany. As of 2018, its website received almost 1 million visitors per month.
