= Alpes Lasers =

Israeli-Swiss engineering company

Alpes Lasers S.A.
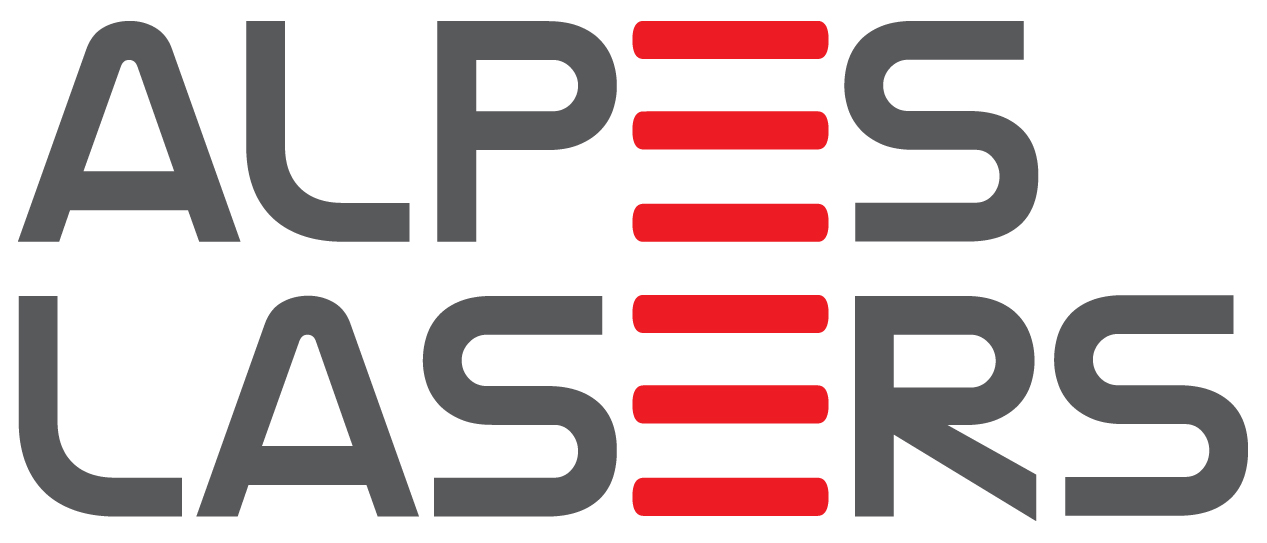

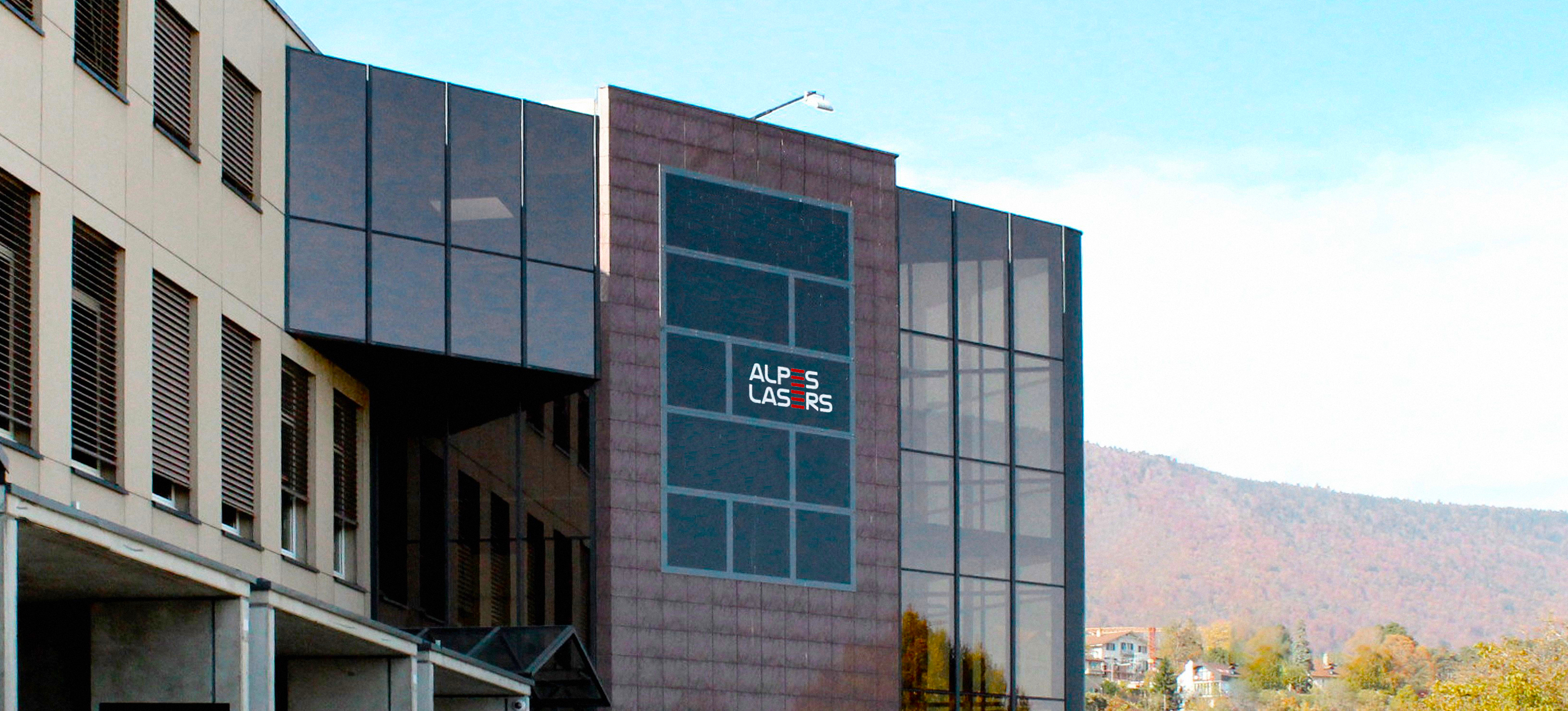
- Alpes Lasers HQ in Switzerland
- Type: Public
- Industry: Photonics
- Founded: (August 22, 1998; 28 years ago)
- Founders: Jérôme Faist, Antoine Muller, Matthias Beck
- Headquarters: Avenue des Pâquiers 1, 2072 St. Blaise, Switzerland
- Key people: Antoine Muller (CEO)
- Products: Quantum-cascade_laser; Frequency Comb
- Website: Official website

Alpes Lasers S.A. is an engineering company and manufacturer of Infrared lasers and electrical drivers based in St-Blaise, Canton of Neuchâtel and controlled by the Israeli defense company Elbit Systems (source: Neuchatel company register). The company was the first to commercialize the quantum-cascade laser (QCL) for scientific, industrial and medical use. The company has also developed QCLs for defensive countermeasure applications for the United States Air Force.

The company was founded in 1998 by physicists Jérôme Faist), Antoine Muller and Matthias Beck as a spin-off from the University of Neuchâtel. The company became involved in the design, manufacture and distribution of QCLs, which were first developed by Jerome Faist, Federico Capasso, Deborah Sivco, Carlo Sirtori, Albert Hutchinson, and Alfred Cho at Bell Laboratories in 1994. Prior to founding Alpes Lasers, Faist co-authored the US patent for the quantum cascade laser. In Switzerland, the firm has worked on projects with the university of Neuchatel and ETH Zurich where Faist currently holds a professorship in the department of physics.

In 2007, Alpes Lasers supplied NASA with lasers for gas analysis instruments on Mars rovers.

In 2017, the firm introduced QCL frequency combs commercially.

== Connections with Elbit Systems ==
In January 2026, Swiss media outlet Heidi.news reported that Alpese Lasers appeared to be an unofficial subsidiary of Elbit Systems, with a number of Elbit executives on its board, and at lest one employee of Alpes Lasers referring to it as "Alpes Lasers, owned by Elbit Systems."

In November 2026, Swiss investigative outlet Woz further reported that Alpes Lasers, a manufacturer of Quantum Coded Lasers (QCL), had obtained export licences to Israel of QCL equipment with a value of almost CHF 17 million and that these licences were part of an agreed offset against Switzerland's purchase of Hermes 900 Reconnaissance drones from Elbit. The report went on to state that shipping documents confirmed that the deliveries of QCL laser equipment to Elbit Systems in Israel had been made.
