= Direct laser interference patterning =

In materials science, Direct Laser Interference Patterning (DLIP) is a laser-based technology that uses the physical principle of interference of high-intensity, coherent laser pulses to produce functional periodic microstructures. To achieve interference, the beam is divided by a beam splitter, specialized prisms, or other elements. The beams are then overlapped on amaterial surface to form an interference pattern. If the power of the laser beam is sufficiently high, material removal can occur at the interference maxima through processes such as remelting, evaporation and ablation, while the material at the interference minima remains mostly intact. In this way, a large variety of periodic patterns can be created on the surface of the material. Depending on the lasers used, DLIP can be applied to almost any material and can change the properties of surfaces in many technological areas with regard to electrical and optical properties, tribology (friction and wear), light absorption and wettability.

== History ==
In the 1990s, Frank Mücklich learned about Martin Stutzmann's method for local crystallization of amorphous layers from him at the Technical University of Munich. The method he utilized was based on the interference principle using laser radiation. Mücklich, who had already gained intensive theoretical and experimental experience with interference phenomena during his doctorate, decided to use it by applying high laser intensity for the development of local and periodic variation of the microstructure due to metallurgical effects. With the help of funding he got from the Alfried Krupp sponsorship in 1997, he was able to realise this concept in the laboratories of his Chair for Functional Materials at Saarland University, by acquiring a nanosecond laser and the necessary optical equipment.

What was noticeable in the experiments, however, was that in addition to the local metallurgical effects observed, i.e. microstructural changes in the material (like grain size distribution, orientation), also the micro-topography of the surface could be controlled. Furthermore, the geometry of the periodic pattern depended on the number of interfering laser beams, their angle with respect to the materia's surface and the beam polarization. In this way, the history of Direct Laser Interference Patterning started.

Inspired by Nachtigall's bionics research, the joint idea initially arose of reproducing the surface structures that were typical in living natural systems and evolutionarily optimised for the respective "functionalities" in plants and animals within the framework of the interdisciplinary research topic of "Biologically Composed Materials". The work with his doctoral student at the time, Andrés Lasagni, was particularly inspiring and achieved rapid successes: in 2006, Lasagni received his doctorate as the best doctoral student of the year for structuring by laser interference metallurgy in the micro/nano range ("Advanced design of periodical structures by laser interference metallurgy in the micro/nano scale on macroscopic areas"). For their successful publications, the jury of the International Journal of Materials Research - IJMR awarded Frank Mücklich, Andrés Lasagni and Claus Daniel the Werner Koester Prize of the DGM.

In 2008, after his postdoctoral stay as a Humboldt Fellow in the USA, Lasagni returned to Germany with a Fraunhofer Attract Grant and established a research team on "Surface Functionalization" at the Fraunhofer IWS, in Dresden. There he developed many compact optics which are crucial for the robust application of today's DLIP technology, while Mücklich and his team in Saarbrücken continued to open up new materials engineering application fields for surface functionalisation through DLIP and in 2009 opened the Material Engineering Center Saarland, where direct industry collaborations promoted the technology transfer.

In 2013, Andrés Lasagni received the DGM's Masing Memorial Award for his extraordinary achievements.

Later in 2016, Mücklich's and Lasagni's teams were awarded the Berthold Leibinger Innovation Prize for the development of direct laser interference patterning (DLIP) for their joint innovative laser technology platform and uniquely successful cooperation.

Together with Dominik Britz and Ralf Zastrau, Mücklich and Lasagni founded the company SurFunction GmbH to commercialise the technology on the market for the first time.

== Pros and Cons of the method ==
DLIP offers several advantages and disadvantages compared to other methods for the creation of defined micropatterns:

Advantages:

- Compared to direct laser writing (DLW) where a laser beam creates each surface feature individually, DLIP can create thousands of surface features (e.g. dots, pillars, lines) with a single laser pulse and can therefore realize much faster process speeds.
- Since the size of the surface features is determined by the shape of the interference pattern, the ability to focus the laser beam as a whole (Abbe limit) does not present a limiting factor. This makes it possible to create features in the micrometer and sub-micrometer range. For instance, line structures with spatial periods as small as 180 nm were achieved in DLC coatings using UV laser radiation.
- DLIP is a single step technique that can be implemented "in-line" without the need for extensive pre- or post-treatment.

Disadvantages:

- To ensure controlled interference between the laser beams, it is crucial that these beams are coherent. This requirement makes the design of the optical setup for DLIP relatively challenging, as disturbances to one or more sub-beams can lead to a loss of coherence, causing distortions in the interference pattern or even its complete loss.
- As DLIP is ideally used to pattern relatively large areas per laser pulse (compared to DLW), the lasers used generally require relatively high pulse energies, which can make them comparatively expensive to acquire.

== Types of beam splitters ==
The coherent laser beams required for the technique are generally produced by splitting a primary beam into two or more sub-beams. As both beams originate from the same source, coherence is ensured as long as the subsequent optics do not disturb it.

There are a variety of methods to split the primary laser beam:

- prisms
- laser beam dividers
- diffraction gratings
- DOEs (diffractive optical elements)
- Lloyd (based on perpendicularly placed and connected mirrors)

== The process ==
Figuratively, the electromagnetic waves of a laser beam can overlap similar to water waves, forming intensity patterns. This principle is called interference. If a wave crest of the first propagating wave meets a wave crest of the overlapping, second wave, this results in the formation of a larger wave, called constructive interference. If a wave trough meets a wave crest, this results in the extinction of the wave, called destructive interference.

In this way, overlapping coherent laser beams are used to create intensity patterns that are projected onto a component surface. The material is melted or evaporated in areas of constructive interference, depending on the pulse length, while it remains almost unaffected in areas of destructive interference. The number and arrangement of the beams in relation to each other determines the type of pattern applied. This can be, for example, a line pattern, cross pattern, dot pattern or almost any periodic surface texture.

Higher complexities of surface patterns can be created with an increasing number of beams. The angle between the overlapping laser beams and the wavelength of the used laser determine the structure size (period) of the applied periodic intensity distribution.

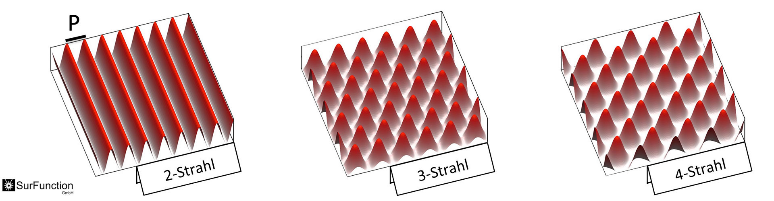

In contrast to other laser-based processing methods, such as direct laser writing, the laser beam diameter has not to be focused. This means that a significantly larger area can be processed per laser pulse. At the same time, microscopic small structures, which are even smaller than the diffraction limit (which determines the smallest possible beam diameter at the focal position), can be created quickly and without contact.

Therefore, DLIP combined with a high-frequency laser, can achieve throughputs in the range of >1 m^{2}/min.

The DLIP process has a very high depth of focus compared to laser writing, as DLIP does not rely on precise focusing of the laser beam, but creates an "interference volume" within which the surface is equally structured with the corresponding interference pattern.

DLIP offers a effectively infinite variety of structuring possibilities through the use of nano-, pico- or femtosecond lasers, as well as by varying the number of used interfering laser beams, their geometrical configuration as well as the wavelength of the radiation used.

== Prominent research projects ==
More than 500 publications (as of 2022) have been published on research involving DLIP technology.

Projects related to research in space are an important topic area to investigate the potential for the hygienic properties of surface texturing by DLIP. The impact of biofilms is greater in space than on Earth because, on the one hand, crew life and mission success depend on the nominal operation of mechanical systems, which can be interrupted by material damage associated with biofilm growth, and, on the other hand, the isolated, confined environment of spaceflight can increase disease transmission rates. In the case of the International Space Station (ISS), biofilms are a problem of the Environmental Control and Life Support System (ECLSS), in particular the Water Processor Unit (WPA). The aim is to understand the behaviour of microorganisms and the formation of biofilms, since they have an impact on the health (of the astronauts) as well as the fact that biofilms lead to material damage, which should be minimised for reasons of sustainability and to improve the longevity of products and materials in industry and in many sectors also on Earth.

The following space projects in cooperation with NASA and ESA received special media attention:

- Touching surfaces (Testing antimicrobial surfaces for space-flight and earth applications): In this experiment, novel surfaces with and without active antimicrobial properties are being tested for their antimicrobial efficacy under space conditions in combination with bacteria contact-control surface structuring by DLIP. The contact surfaces were touched by astronauts on board the ISS. The microbes on them will then be examined on Earth with regard to biofilm formation.
- Biofilms (Testing Laser Structured Antimicrobial Surfaces Under Space Conditions): The BIOFILMS project investigates biofilm formation on various antimicrobial surfaces under space conditions. These surfaces consist of different metals with and without active bactericidal properties, which were additionally surface-structured by ultra-short pulsed DLIP on the scale of single bacterial cells. In this way, the bacterial strains used in the experiment are offered improved or worsened contact conditions. The influence of these surface properties on bacterial biofilm formation is thereby investigated in the context of variable gravity by rotation in a centrifuge within the ISS for the Moon, Mars and Earth."
- Space Biofilms: In late 2019, the Space Biofilms experiment launched to the ISS to investigate the specifics of biofilms formed in space compared to their corresponding counterpart on Earth. In addition to the expression of antimicrobial resistance genes, novel materials, including those based on DLIP technology, were tested here as potential biofilm containment strategies for future critical ECLSS components.
- ConTACTS Concordia: The Concordia experiment ConTACTS is designed to analyse antimicrobial surfaces as a strategy to reduce the microbial load on contact surfaces and actively track microbial spread. The Concordia Station in Antarctica serves here as a model environment within the hibernation phase of several months in the Arctic winter to investigate the special conditions within spatially closed artificial habitats. In the ConTACTS Concordia project, sample carriers with antimicrobial functionalised surfaces are placed in different areas of Concordia Station during the wintering period of several months. These locations are expected to vary in their environmental conditions, such as temperature and humidity, and in the frequency of human presence. The touch arrays include antimicrobial copper-based metallic surfaces with and without additional topographic surface texturing with DLIP. The surfaces are exposed to both direct daily contact and pure airflow exposure in different atmospherically varying areas of the station. The properties produced by DLIP are expected to remain intact despite the extreme environmental conditions. The project helps to understand microbial dispersal in enclosed habitats, including through frequently touched surfaces, and to test optimised containment strategies.

Other prominent projects:

Photovoltaic project by Fraunhofer IWS and IAPP: In order to enhance the efficiency of thin film photovoltaic systems, flexible polymer materials were textured by DLIP in 2011, reaching an enhanced electrical performance of 21% compared to untreated foils. This improvement was possible due to the produced periodic structure, which increases the optical path in to the active material of the cells. Thus, DLIP was identified to have a great potential for the development of high-efficiency solar cells for organic as well as other thin-film solar technologies.

== Prizes related to DLIP ==
- Masing Memorial Prize 2020 to Andreas Rosenkranz
- Transfer Prize of the Steinbeis Foundation | Löhn Prize (2019) to Mücklich and the Material Engineering Center Saarland (MECS) together with TE Connectivity
- Materials Science and Technology Prize of the FEMS (2017) to Andrés Lasagni
- Berthold Leibinger Innovation Prize (2016) to the Direct Laser Interference Patterning project groups of Mücklich and Lasagni for the best laser innovation
- Masing Memorial Prize 2012 to Andrés Lasagni
- German High Tech Champions Award (2011) to Andrés Lasagni for research on increasing the efficiency of photovoltaic systems
- Werner Köster Prize (2006) to Frank Mücklich, Andrés Lasagni and Claus Daniel for the best publication of the year in the International Journal of Materials Research
- Fraunhofer Attract Award to Andrés Lasagni for "Micro/nano" Fabrication of Surface Architectures using Direct Laser Interference Patterning
