= Jérôme Faist =

Swiss physicist

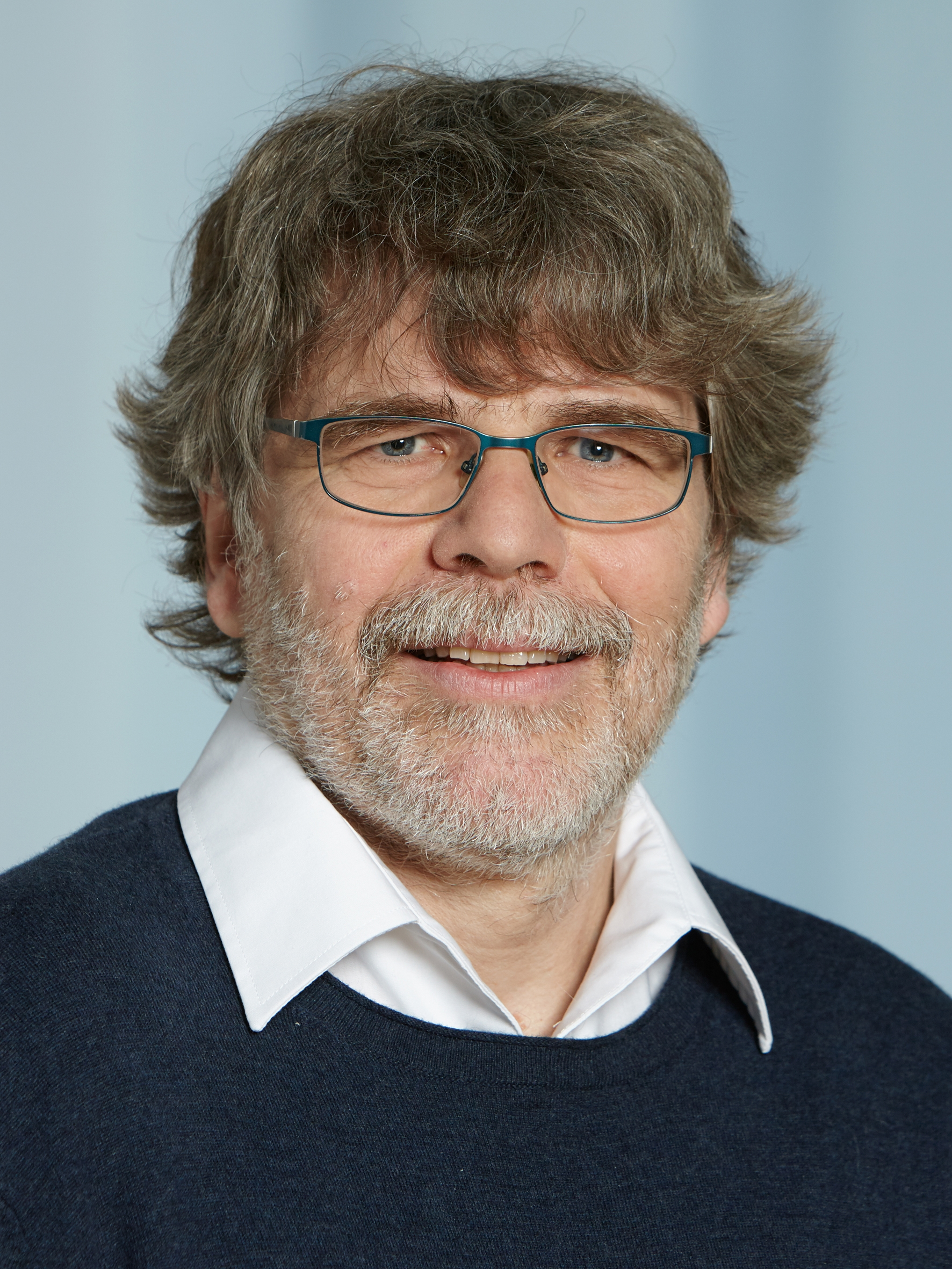
- Jérôme Faist (2019)
- Born: 23 January 1962 (age 64); Geneva, Switzerland
- Known for: Quantum cascade laser
- Awards: IEE Premium (1995); IEEE/LEOS William Streifer award (1998); Michael Lunn award (1999); ISCS Young scientist award (1999); Swiss National Latsis Prize (2002); Julius Springer Prize for Applied Physics (2019); Member of National Academy of Engineering (2022); Kenneth J. Button Prize (2024)

Academic background
- Education: École Polytechnique Fédérale de Lausanne
- Thesis: (1989)

Academic work
- Discipline: Optoelectronics
- Institutions: Swiss Federal Institute of Technology Zurich
- Website: qoe.ethz.ch/people/person-detail.MTQ1MjQ4.TGlzdC8zOTY4LDE0ODU4NDc1MTY=.html

Jérôme Faist (* January 23, 1962 in Geneva) is a Swiss physicist and since 2007 professor at the institute of quantum electronics at ETH Zürich.

== Academic career ==
Jérôme Faist attended the EPF Lausanne under Franz-Karl Reinhart where he obtained his Bachelor's degree in 1985 and his Ph.D. in Optoelectronics in 1989. His study focused on vertical-cavity surface emitting lasers and optical modulators. Following his doctorate, he worked at IBM in Rüschlikon as a post-doc between 1989 and 1991. In 1991, he switched to Federico Capasso's group in Bell Laboratories Lucent Technologies in Murray Hill, New Jersey where he first worked as a post-doc and then as a Member of Technical Staff. In his time there, his work focused on intersubband transitions and the development of the quantum cascade laser. In 1994, he succeeded in building an experimental quantum cascade laser using molecular-beam epitaxy collaboratively with Federico Capasso, Deborah Sivco, Carlo Sirtori, Albert Hutchinson and Alfred Y. Cho

In 1997, Faist became Full Professor at the University of Neuchâtel, Neuchâtel, Switzerland, where he remained until 2007. His work there focused mainly on mid- and far-infrared intersubband lasers. In his time there, in 1998, Faist founded the spin-off company Alpes Lasers with the goal to commercialize the quantum cascade laser for scientific, industrial and medical use. In 2007, Faist became professor in the institute of quantum electronics at ETH Zürich. Further, Faist also became the head of the FIRST Center for Micro- and Nanoscience at ETH.

His current research interests are the development of high performance quantum cascade lasers in the mid and far-infrared and the physics of coherence in intersubband transitions in the presence of strong magnetic fields.
