= Aktionsgemeinschaft Soziale Marktwirtschaft =

German non-profit association

Logo of the Aktionsgemeinschaft Soziale Marktwirtschaft e. V.

The Aktionsgemeinschaft Soziale Marktwirtschaft e. V. (Action Group for Social Market Economy) is a non-profit association founded in 1953 and based in Tübingen. According to its own description, the ASM's mission is to promote the social market economy. The association's work is aimed at the scientific community as well as the interested public.

== Goals ==
The action group has set itself the goal of contributing to further economic education. The group cooperates with other think tanks focused on regulatory economics, such as the Ludwig Erhard Foundation, the Hanns Martin Schleyer Foundation, the Walter Eucken Institute, and NOUS – Network for Regulatory Economics and Social Philosophy. Under the leadership of Alexander Rüstow, the action group became an important institution for transferring ordoliberal ideas into the political discourse in order to reach and influence a broader public beyond the scientific sphere. Political scientist Elmar Altvater saw the group as an instrument for propagating the market economy.

== History ==
The association was founded on January 23, 1953. One of its co-founders, Otto Lautenbach, who had previously been head of the Freiwirtschaftsbund (Free Economy Association), became convinced that interest was not the main problem, as social reformer Silvio Gesell believed, but that increasingly excessive government activity would inevitably lead to collectivism and a totalitarian state. He therefore broke with the Freiwirtschaft and, together with several supporters, resigned from the organisation.

In 1953, the Frankfurter Allgemeine Zeitung compared the function of the ASM to that of a watchdog. The ASM was considered the "unofficial mouthpiece" of the federal government's economic policy and was particularly active in supporting the policies of Ludwig Erhard during election campaigns. A central platform during these years were the workshops attended by thinkers and practitioners of the social market economy such as Ludwig Erhard, Wilhelm Röpke, Alfred Müller-Armack, Franz Böhm, Günter Schmölders, and Karl Schiller.

In 1961, Wolfgang Frickhöffer took over as chairman of the ASM from Alexander Rüstow, who was appointed honorary chairman. Joachim Starbatty was elected as the new chairman in November 1991. The office was relocated from Heidelberg to Tübingen in 1993. In November 2014, Joachim Starbatty resigned from the board of the Action Group for Social Market Economy and was succeeded by Nils Goldschmidt. Against the backdrop of Starbatty's political involvement with the AfD, the Action Group realigned itself in terms of content and personnel. In 2018, Starbatty returned the Alexander Rüstow Plaque awarded to him by the association and resigned from the Action Group. He wanted to express his aversion to Angela Merkel, who had received the award in the same year.

== Organisation ==
Since 2014, Nils Goldschmidt has been chairman of the group. Other members of the executive board are Claus Dierksmeier, Rolf Hasse, Thomas Köster and Winfried Kreis. The managing director is Ute Friederich. The scientific advisory board includes Lars Feld, Otmar Issing, Jan-Otmar Hesse, Stefan Kolev, Martin Nettesheim, Jürgen Stark and Christian Waldhoff.

== Alexander Rüstow Medal ==
Since 1964, the association has awarded the Alexander Rüstow Medal to individuals who have rendered outstanding services to the strengthening and further development of the social market economy. The award winners include:

- 1964: Wilhelm Blum
- 1967: Ludwig Erhard
- 1968: Hans Otto Wesemann
- 1969: Ernst Schneider, Karl Blessing
- 1970: Franz Böhm
- 1971: Albrecht Düren
- 1972: Eberhard Günther
- 1973: Karl Schiller
- 1974: Gerd Bucerius, Hans Friderichs
- 1975: Thorwald Risler, Paul Schnitker
- 1976: Alfred Müller-Armack
- 1978: Elisabeth Noelle-Neumann, Wolfgang Frickhoeffer
- 1982: Hans-Dietrich Genscher
- 1986: Otto Graf Lambsdorff
- 1987: Karl Darscheid
- 1992: Hans D. Barbier, Tyll Necker, Otto Schlecht
- 1994: Helmut Schlesinger
- 1996: Wolfgang Kartte
- 1998: Michael Otto
- 2000: Erich Lange, Dieter Spiess
- 2001: Kurt Biedenkopf
- 2004: Bernhard Vogel, Hans Willgerodt
- 2007: Berthold Leibinger
- 2011: Horst Köhler
- 2013: Paul Kirchhof
- 2015: Reinhard Marx
- 2018: Angela Merkel
- 2021: Jeffrey D. Sachs
- 2024: Deirdre N. McCloskey

== Alfred Müller-Armack Medal of Merit ==
Since 2016, the Action Group has awarded a medal of merit in memory of Alfred Müller-Armack. The recipients include:

- 2016: Franz Schoser
- 2018: Walter Oswalt, Rolf H. Hasse
- 2022: Ortwin Guhl, Karen Horn
- 2023: Jürgen Stark
