= Frank Mücklich =

German materials scientist

Frank Mücklich (born August 17, 1959) is a German materials scientist. He is professor at Saarland University and leads the Chair of Functional Materials.

== Biography ==
Frank Mücklich was born in Dresden, Germany. He grew up in Freiberg where he attended the Geschwister-Scholl-Gymnasium. From 1980 to 1985, Mücklich studied Physical Metallurgy and Materials Science at the Freiberg University of Mining and Technology. In 1988, he received his PhD with a dissertation on 'X-ray diffraction analysis of point defects in highly perfect Gallium arsenide single crystals' at the Heinrich Oettel Institute. As postdoctoral researcher he stayed at the University of Technology in Freiberg where he headed the metallography working group at the Institute of Physical Metallurgy.

In 1990, Mücklich went on a Max Planck scholarship to the Max Planck Institute for Metals Research in Stuttgart led by Günter Petzow and became group leader for functional materials. Five years later, he was appointed professor at Saarland University and built up the Chair of Functional Materials. In 2008, he founded the European School of Materials and, in 2009, the Material Engineering Center Saarland as a research center of the Steinbeis Foundation.

== Scientific contributions ==
Mücklich works in the areas of surface structuring and material characterization. His focus is on surfaces and thin films exploring new possibilities of material functionalisation mainly by pulsed laser beams, as well as thin film phenomena and electrical erosion. His research concerns the three-dimensional microstructure of materials at micro-, nano- and atomic-scale. He works scale-dependent with various experimental and theoretical methods. Together with the mathematician Joachim Ohser he described the theoretical background of his research in the book Statistical Analysis of Microstructures in Materials Science.

== Honors ==
- 1994: Georg Masing Memorial Prize of the German Society for Materials Science
- 1997: Alfried Krupp Prize for Young University Teachers of the Alfried Krupp von Bohlen und Halbach Foundation
- 2007: Werner Köster Award of the German Society for Materials Science (together with Claus Daniel and Andrés Lasagni)
- 2008: Roland Mitsche Prize of ASMET Austria and the German Society for Materials Science
- 2010: Werner Köster Award of the German Society for Materials Science (together with Alexandra Velichko)
- 2012: Löhn Award, transfer prize of the Steinbeis Foundation
- 2013: Copper innovation prize of the German Copper Institute
- 2016: Henry Clifton Sorby Award of ASM International
- 2016: Berthold Leibinger Innovationspreis
- 2018: Full member of the German Academy of Science and Engineering (acatech)
- 2018: Fellow of the American Society for Materials
- 2018: President (Science) of the German Materials Society (DGM)
- 2023: Heyn Memorial Coin of the German Materials Society (DGM)
- 2023: Albert-Keil-Prize of the German Association for Electrical, Electronic & Information Technologies (VDE)

== External links and sources ==
- Chair for Functional Materials at Saarland University
- Material Engineering Center Saarland (MECS)
- European School of Materials (EUSMAT)
- Google Scholar Profile
- Berthold Leibinger Innovationspreis award video
