= Heyn =

Heyn is a surname. Notable people with the surname include:

- Adolfo Jara Heyn (born 1964), Paraguayan footballer and manager
- Bertram Heyn (1912–1998), Sri Lankan Burgher general and cricketer
- Clara Heyn (1924–1998), Israeli botanist
- David Heyn (born 1945), Sri Lankan cricketer
- Emil Heyn (1867–1922), German metallurgist
- Luis Jara Heyn (born 1964), Paraguayan footballer

== See also ==
- Heyns
