= Andrés Fabián Lasagni =

Materials scientist and laser expert

Andrés Fabián Lasagni (born August 27, 1977) is a professor at the Technischen Universität Dresden and holds the Chair for Laser-based Manufacturing.

== Biography ==
Lasagni was born in Cinco Saltos, Argentina. He attended the “Armando Novelli secondary school” from 1991 to 1996 in the same city. From 1997 to 2002, he studied Chemical Engineering at the “Universidad Nacional del Comahue”, in Neuquén, Argentina. In 2003, he emigrated to Germany and received his PhD with a dissertation on “Advanced design of periodical structures by laser interference metallurgy” (also called “Direct Laser Interference Patterning”) at the University of Saarland. In 2007, Lasagni went on an Alexander von Humboldt scholarship to the Georgia Institute of Technology and the University of Michigan (US), continuing his research on laser surface functionalization. In 2008, he created the group “Surface Functionalization” at Fraunhofer IWS in Dresden and in 2012 was appointed to the Chair for laser-based Manufacturing.

== Scientific contributions ==
Lasagni works in the areas of laser-based processing, in particular surface structuring using pulsed laser sources. He has more than 30 patents (stand 2022), many of them related to several optical configurations for Direct Laser Interference Patterning as well as applications related to this technology.

== Honors ==
- 2020: Member of the “Sächsische Akademie der Wissenschaften zu Leipzig”, Germany
- 2019: Domingo Faustino Sarmiento award from the Senate of the Argentine Nation, for the outstanding achievements in the field of engineering sciences, Buenos Aires, Argentina
- 2017: Materials Science and Technology Prize 2017 from the Federation of European Materials Societies (FEMS).
- 2016: International Berthold Leibinger Innovationspreis 2016 (2nd position), Project title: “Development of a Direct Laser Interference Patterning (DLIP) System”, Germany.
- 2015: Green Photonics Award 2015 from the International Society for Optics and Photonics (SPIE), Fabrication of highly efficient transparent metal thin film electrodes using Direct Laser Interference Patterning, San Francisco, USA.
- 2013: Masing-Gedächtnispreis 2012 from the German Society for Materials Science (DGM), awarded to young researchers with an outstanding scientific career.
- 2011: German High Tech Champion in Photovoltaic 2011 award from Ministry of Education and Research (BMBF) and the Fraunhofer Association.
- 2007: Werner Köster Prize from the German Society for Materials Science (DGM) and the Carl Hanser Publishing Company (International Journal of Materials Research, 97, pp 1337-1344).
- 2007: Fritz-Grasenick-Prize from the Austrian Society for Electron Microscopy, with Fernando Lasagni.
