= Berthold Leibinger Zukunftspreis =

German award

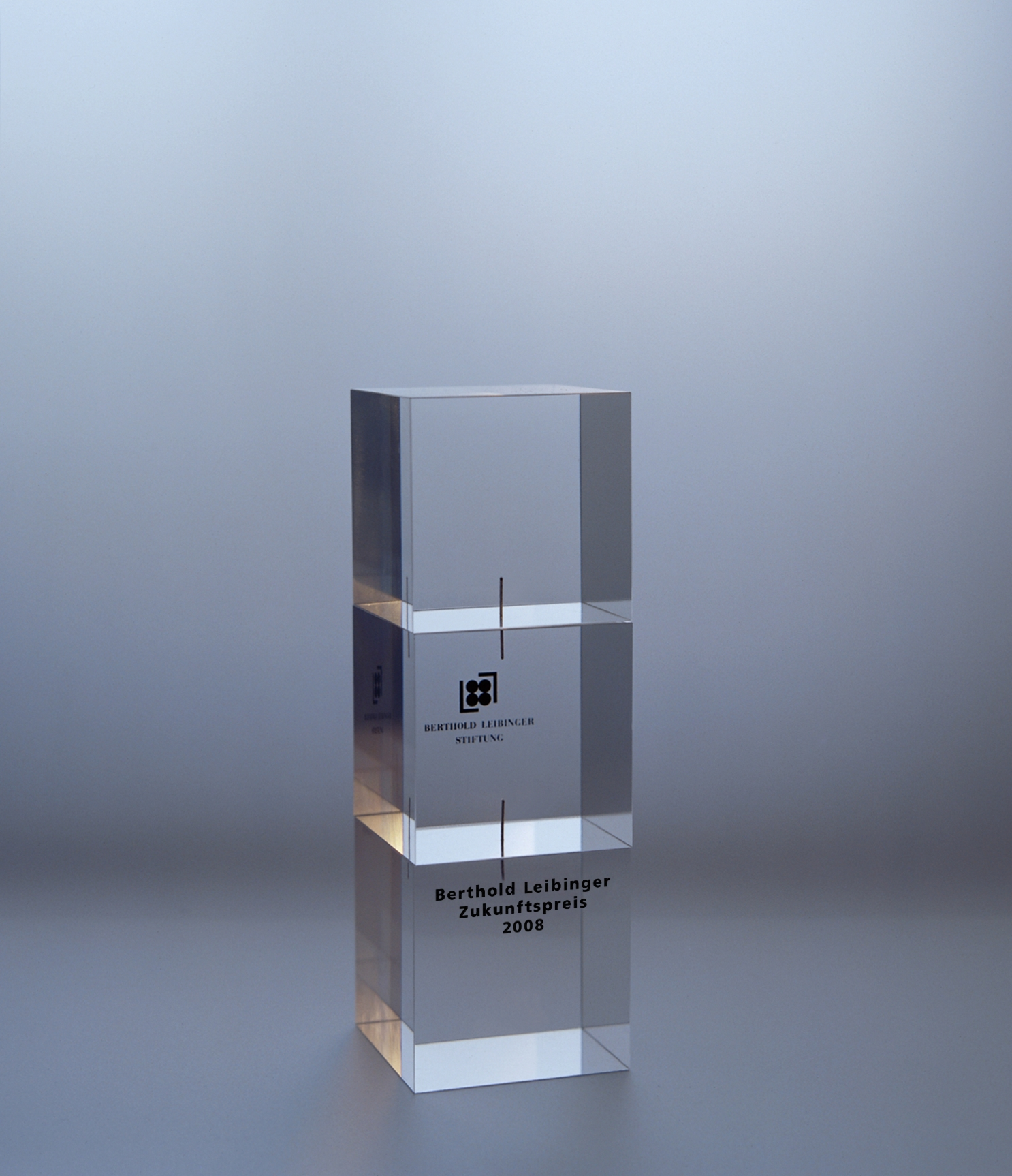

The Berthold Leibinger Zukunftspreis (future prize) is an international award for "excellent research on the application or generation of laser light". Since 2006, it is biennially awarded by the German non-profit foundation Berthold Leibinger Stiftung as part of its Laser Prizes, with an amount of 50,000 euros.

== Recipients ==
As of 2023, two Zukunftspreis laureates have also received the Nobel Prize in Physics: Gérard Mourou in 2018, and Anne L'Huillier in 2023.

Year	Name	Institution	For
2006	H. Jeffrey Kimble	California Institute of Technology	cavity quantum electrodynamics
2008	Xiaoliang Sunney Xie	Harvard University	single-molecule biophysics and non-linear optical microscopy
2010	Federico Capasso	Harvard University	quantum cascade lasers
2012	Osamu Kumagai	Sony Corp.	multi-wavelength laser diode for backward compatibility of three generations' optical disc systems
2014	Philip Russell	Max Planck Institute for the Science of Light	photonic crystal fibre
2016	Gérard Mourou	École polytechnique	invention of the chirped pulse amplification (CPA) and pushing the frontier on extreme light
2018	Karl Deisseroth	Stanford University	laser in the development and implementation of optogenetics
2021	David N. Payne	University of Southampton	erbium-doped fiber amplifier (EDFA) and pioneering fiber optic technologies
2023	Anne L'Huillier	Lund University	high harmonic generation and attosecond physics
2025	Jun Ye	JILA, National Institute of Standards and Technology and University of Colorado	Optical clocks and frequency metrology

== See also ==
- Berthold Leibinger Innovationspreis (affiliated innovation prize)
- Berthold Leibinger (founder of issuing foundation)
- List of physics awards
