= Steinbeis-Hochschule Berlin =

Private university in Berlin, Germany

Coordinates: 52.5094°N 13.4739°E

Steinbeis Foundation
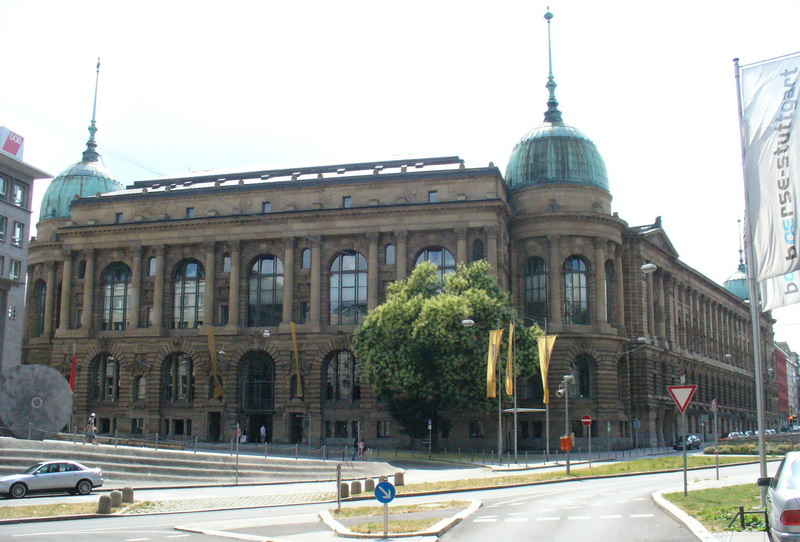
- The Haus der Wirtschaft (House of Commerce) in Central Stuttgart, headquarters of the Steinbeis Foundation amongst other Institutions
- Motto: Knowledge. Transfer. Application.
- Type: Private Business School
- Established: 1998
- Dean: Johann Löhn
- Faculty: 39 Chairs
- Students: 4.244
- Location: Berlin, Berlin, Germany
- Campus: Berlin
- Study programs: Bachelor of Science Bachelor of Engineering; Bachelor of Business Administration (BBA); Master of Arts; Master of Science; Master of Laws; Master of Business Administration (MBA) Master of Business Engineering (MBE)
- Colors: Black and White
- Website: steinbeis-hochschule.de

Steinbeis-Hochschule Berlin (SHB) (or Steinbeis University) is a private, state-approved university in Berlin, Germany, well-known for its focus on applied research and industry-oriented education. It is primarily known for its cooperative education programs with large German corporations such as Siemens, Mercedes, Porsche, SAP, Deutsche Telekom and Bosch. The university is based in Berlin and has supplementary campuses in Baden-Württemberg.

It operates under the Steinbeis Foundation, which emphasizes knowledge and technology transfer between academia and business. Founded in 1998, the university offers programs that are often part-time or project-based, designed for working professionals who want to integrate their academic learning with real-world business challenges.

Steinbeis University’s programs span a range of fields, including business, management, engineering, and technology, with a strong emphasis on practical, hands-on projects. The university comprises several schools and institutes, including the Schools of Next Practices (S-Next), which focuses on international and English-language programs in business and tech.

== History ==
As early as 1994, the Steinbeis Foundation was working on the fundamentals of a new academy. The idea of a private Steinbeis University in Baden-Württemberg was soon in coming. The circumstances at the time, however, were not advantageous. As a result, Johann Löhn, the then chairman of the board, chose not to pursue the idea further.

The Secretary of State at the time, Erich Thies, was a strong advocate of the university. After discussion with the Berlin State Senate, Steinbeis received state approval to move forward with SHB. The university opened in autumn of 1998 offering the MBE (Master of Business and Engineering).

1999 saw the introduction of the MedienMBA, the first MBA for senior managers working in the German media. In 2000 SHB added MBA degrees for Chinese executives and German fast-track employees. In 2001 SHB launched its first bachelor's degree program.

The university is organized as a business, with the institutes acting more like "companies within a company". Degrees based on this model require students to "partner" with a company at the start of their studies and create a project that applies learned knowledge to a realistic business challenge.

Over 4000 employed professionals are enrolled in SHB.

== Criticism ==
At the beginning of 2014, the university received nationwide criticism after it announced plans to launch a Steinbeis Transfer Institute in Traunstein in September 2014 offering a bachelor's degree in homeopathy. Critics called it a "disgrace for the science center of Bavaria". According to the Society for the Scientific Investigation of Pseudoscience (GWUP) the course is "simply an academic misnomer." After a reconstruction of the Steinbeis University overall, study degrees were strictly controlled by the Steinbeis University and study courses like the bachelor's degree in homeopathy were banned from the program.

According to the journalist Weymayr, from the Christian Science Monitor, the program was a "training school for medical practitioners" which "glosses over an academic cloak upgraded" with dignity. You talk "from the master and bachelor of college, of, academic, '" says "all the serious degree programs that are committed to academic standards and are based on normal universities, discredited." The physician Edzard Ernst stated that the programme "does not even meet the minimum of critical thinking and academic integrity". He added that the implementation of such courses was "extremely regrettable - they devalue the Bachelor of Science in all other areas and have nothing to do with science." Against the accreditation of the degree program a petition to the Senate of Berlin was directed that the college is responsible.

At the beginning of April 2014, Spiegel Online stated that the proposed course of study will not be introduced.

== Study programs ==
- Master of Business Engineering (MBE) – (General Management, Business Intelligence)
- Master of Arts (MA)
- Master of Laws (LL.M.)
- Master of Business Administration (MBA)
- Master of Science (M.Sc.)
- Bachelor of Arts (BA)
- Bachelor of Business Administration (BBA)
- Bachelor of Engineering (B.Eng.)
- Bachelor of Science (B.Sc.)
- Master of Engineering (M.Eng.) - In collaboration with Kaiserlslautern Hochschule

Until this university of applied sciences lost its right to award doctorates in 2016, it offered doctoral programs (PhD or the German PhD equivalent Dr. rer. oec.). Since then, doctoral programs have continued to be offered, but always in cooperation with and with a degree certificate from partner universities in other European countries.

== Institutes ==
- Steinbeis University - Schools of Next Practices (S-NEXT)
- Steinbeis Center of Management and Technology (SCMT)
- School of Management and Technology (SMT)
- Stuttgart Institute of Management and Technology (SIMT)
- Steinbeis Institute of Executive Capabilities (IEC)
- Steinbeis Business Academy (SBA)
- School of International Business and Entrepreneurship (SIBE)
- School of Governance Risk & Compliance (School GRC)
- IBR School of Executive Management
- ISW Business School Freiburg
- Berlin School of Creative Leadership
