= Jürgen Czarske =

German electrical engineer

- Education: University of Hanover
- Awards: Berthold Leibinger Innovationspreis (2008); Joseph Fraunhofer Award/Robert M. Burley Prize (2019)
- Scientific career
- Workplaces: Laser Zentrum Hannover; TU Dresden

Jürgen W. Czarske (born 20 December 1962) is a German electrical engineer and a measurement system technician. He is the director of the TU Dresden Biomedical Computational Laser Systems competence center and of Institute of Circuits and Systems of Faculty Electrical and Computer Engineering and a co-opted professor of physics. He is adjunct professor of Optical Sciences, Wyant College, University of Arizona, Tucson, USA. Since 2026 is Prof. Czarske visiting professor at Center for Optical Research and Education (CORE) in Japan.

== Career ==
Jürgen Czarske received his doctorate in 1995 at the Institute for Metrology in Mechanical Engineering at the University of Hanover. From 1995 to 2004 he worked at the Laser Laser Zentrum Hannover. From 1996 to 2001 he worked temporarily at research institutions in Japan and the United States of America. After completing his habilitation in the field of measurement technology in the mechanical engineering department of the University of Hanover in 2003, he has been a professor at the Faculty of Electrical Engineering and Information Technology at the TU Dresden since 2004. Prof Czarske is Director of the Institute of Circuits and Systems, since 2016, and of the Center Biomedical Computational Laser Systems (BIOLAS), since 2019. He is Elected Member of Scientific Society for Laser Technology (WLT e.V.), Erlangen, since 2017, and Advisor of the OPTICA-SPIE-Student Chapter of TU Dresden, since 2022. In 2022 he was selected as outstanding editor for Light: Advanced Manufacturing (LAM), China. Since 2023 Prof. Czarske is member of editorial board of Light: Science and Applications of Nature. Since 2024 he is member of editorial board of Advanced Photonics of SPIE (the international society of optics and photonics, Washington, USA). Prof. Jürgen Czarske becomes visiting Professor at Utsunomiya in Japan.

== Research ==
Czarske is mainly concerned with system technology, whereby ultrasound and laser waves are used. The areas of application of the implemented systems envisaged by Czarske are biomedicine (health), process and production engineering (energy and environment), as well as information system technology (communication). For quality assurance in production, he examines optical in-situ form measurements. Ultrasound-based systems are used for flow measurements in order to investigate crystallization processes. Adaptive optics and wavefront control are pursued by Czarske for multi-dimensional microscopy and for light control in biological tissue. This work is important for optogenetics and medical nanorobots. Prof Czarske has invented the laser Doppler velocity profile sensor, which was successfully transferred to the market in cooperation with the Company Intelligent Laser Applications ILA R&D GmbH, Karl-Heinz-Beckurts-Straße 13, Jülich. The profile sensor beats the Heisenberg limit. To take advantage of the high resolved measurements in both velocity and position, the profile sensor was translated into several applications areas such as flow metrology, production technique and process engineering. In recent years, Prof Czarske has achieved paradigm shifts in the combination of deep learning and physics with physics-informed neural networks, which have been transferred to biomedicine and fiber optic information transmission. Novel holography including explainable deep learning was developed for classical and quantum communication and biomedical imaging. The research work was awarded the 2024 SPIE Dennis Gabor Award in Diffractive Optics. His altruism with a variety of volunteer activities was honored with an Honorary Professor, Prof h. c., of USST, Nov. 2024.

Czarske received funding from the DFG (German Science Foundation) for a Reinhart Koselleck Project in both 2014 and 2025—making him one of the first researchers to be awarded this distinction twice. In 2025, the research grant “Physics-Informed Deep Learning Systems for Secure Information Transmission with Multimode Fibers (Phys-Deep-Fiber)” was awarded..

== Honors and awards ==
- Measurement Technology Award of the Arbeitskreis der Hochschullehrer für Messtechnik (AHMT). The award ceremony took place in September 1996 at the Technical University of Munich.
- Berthold Leibinger Innovationspreis (3rd Award), Ditzingen, 7/2008
- Senior Member of the Institute of Electrical and Electronics Engineers, 5/2015
- OSA Fellow, 10/2015
- Fellow of SPIE, 12/2015
- Fellow European Optical Society, 8/2016
- Full member of the Saxon Academy of Sciences and Humanities (since March 2018)
- Joseph Fraunhofer Award/Robert M. Burley Prize of The Optical Society, 9/2019
- Laser Instrumentation Award 2020 of IEEE Photonics Society
- Fellow of the Institution of Engineering and Technology, 7/2021
- Fellow Award (FInstP) of Institute of Physics (IOP), London, UK, 7/2022
- SPIE Community Champion 2020, highlighted by SPIE Director Nelufar Mohajeri, WA, USA, 5/2021
- SPIE Community Champion 2019 for outstanding volunteerism, awarded by SPIE President John Greivenkamp, Arizona/USA, 1/2020
- 2022 Chandra S Vikram Award in Optical Metrology of SPIE (The international Society for Optics and Photonics), awarded in San Diego, California, August 2022
