= Alexander A. Oraevsky =

Russian physicist

- Born: 1957 (age 68–69)
- Occupation: Physicist
- Known for: Development and application of optoacoustic imaging and photoacoustic imaging
- Awards: Berthold Leibinger Innovations Prize (2014) James Smith Award (2015); Fellow of SPIE (2016) Fellow of Optica (2021)

Academic background
- Education: Moscow Physical and Engineering Institute; USSR Academy of Sciences

Alexander A. Oraevsky (born 1957) is a Russian-born academic who is known for work in biomedical optoacoustics. He is sometimes described as the father of biomedical optoacoustic imaging.

== Early life and education ==
Oraevsky was born in 1957. He received his initial training in physics and mathematics at the Moscow Physical and Engineering Institute in Moscow. He earned a B.S. in theoretical and experimental physics in 1978 and a M.S. in ultrafast laser spectroscopy of biomolecules in 1980. In 1986, he completed a doctorate in laser spectroscopy, photochemistry, and biophysics at the Institute of Spectroscopy of the USSR Academy of Sciences.

== Career ==
Oraevsky began research in optoacoustic imaging, sensing, and monitoring in the late 1980s. In 1992, as a Whitaker Fellow, he joined the faculty of Rice University. He later served as director of the Optoacoustic Imaging and Spectroscopy Laboratory at the University of Texas Medical Branch (UTMB) and as an assistant professor in its Department of Ophthalmology and Visual Sciences.

In 1998, Oraevsky founded LaserSonix Technologies to the commercialize optoacoustic imaging systems.

Before founding TomoWave Laboratories in 2010, Oraevsky served as vice president of research and development at Fairway Medical Technologies and as chief scientific officer and a board member of Seno Medical Instruments. At TomoWave, he has led the development of optoacoustic tomography and laser-ultrasound systems for biomedical imaging.

Oraevsky also founded and chairs the SPIE conference Photons Plus Ultrasound: Imaging and Sensing.

== Research ==
Oraevsky's research has centered on biomedical optoacoustics, a hybrid modality that combines optical absorption contrast with ultrasonic detection. Early in the field's development, he authored conference papers proposing time-resolved optoacoustic imaging for layered biological tissues and laser-based optoacoustic imaging in biological tissue.

Among Oraevsky other contributions was the development of combined optoacoustic and ultrasound systems for breast imaging. He designed a clinical platform for co-registered functional and anatomical mapping of breast tumors, which improved diagnostic specificity relative to conventional ultrasound alone.

Oraevsky also co-authored work on nanoparticle-enhanced optoacoustic imaging, including in vivo detection of gold nanorods as contrast agents for laser optoacoustic imaging systems.

== Awards and recognition ==
Oraevsky received an Academy of Sciences award for young researchers in 1987 and an Outstanding Young Faculty Award from the Institute of Spectroscopy in 1989. In 2014, he received the first prize of the Berthold Leibinger Innovations Prize for the invention and development of a laser optoacoustic imaging system and its biomedical applications.

In 2015, he received the James Smith Award from the International Photoacoustic and Photothermal Association for pioneering contributions to biomedical photoacoustic imaging. He was elected a Fellow of SPIE in 2016 and a Fellow of Optica in 2021.
