= Berthold Leibinger Stiftung =

German foundation

The German foundation Berthold Leibinger Stiftung was founded in 1992 by the engineer, entrepreneur and patron Berthold Leibinger in Ditzingen near Stuttgart, Germany. The non-profit foundation is dedicated to cultural, scientific, church related and social issues. The capital stock amounts to 16.6 Million Euros (in 2016). Since 2000 the foundation biennially awards the international innovation prize Berthold Leibinger Innovationspreis for applied laser technology. The Berthold Leibinger Zukunftspreis (future prize) honors milestones in research on the application or generation of laser light since 2006. The Leibinger foundation supports the American Academy in Berlin Fellow's program.
