= Heyns =

Heyns is a surname. Notable people with the surname include:

- Christof Heyns (1959–2021), South African legal scholar
- Jan Heyns (died 1516), Dutch architect
- Johan Heyns (1928–1994), South African theologian
- Michiel Heyns (born 1943), South African writer, translator and academic
- Penelope Heyns (born 1974), South African swimmer

== See also ==
- Heyn
