= Berlin School of Creative Leadership =

Business school in Charlottenburg, Berlin

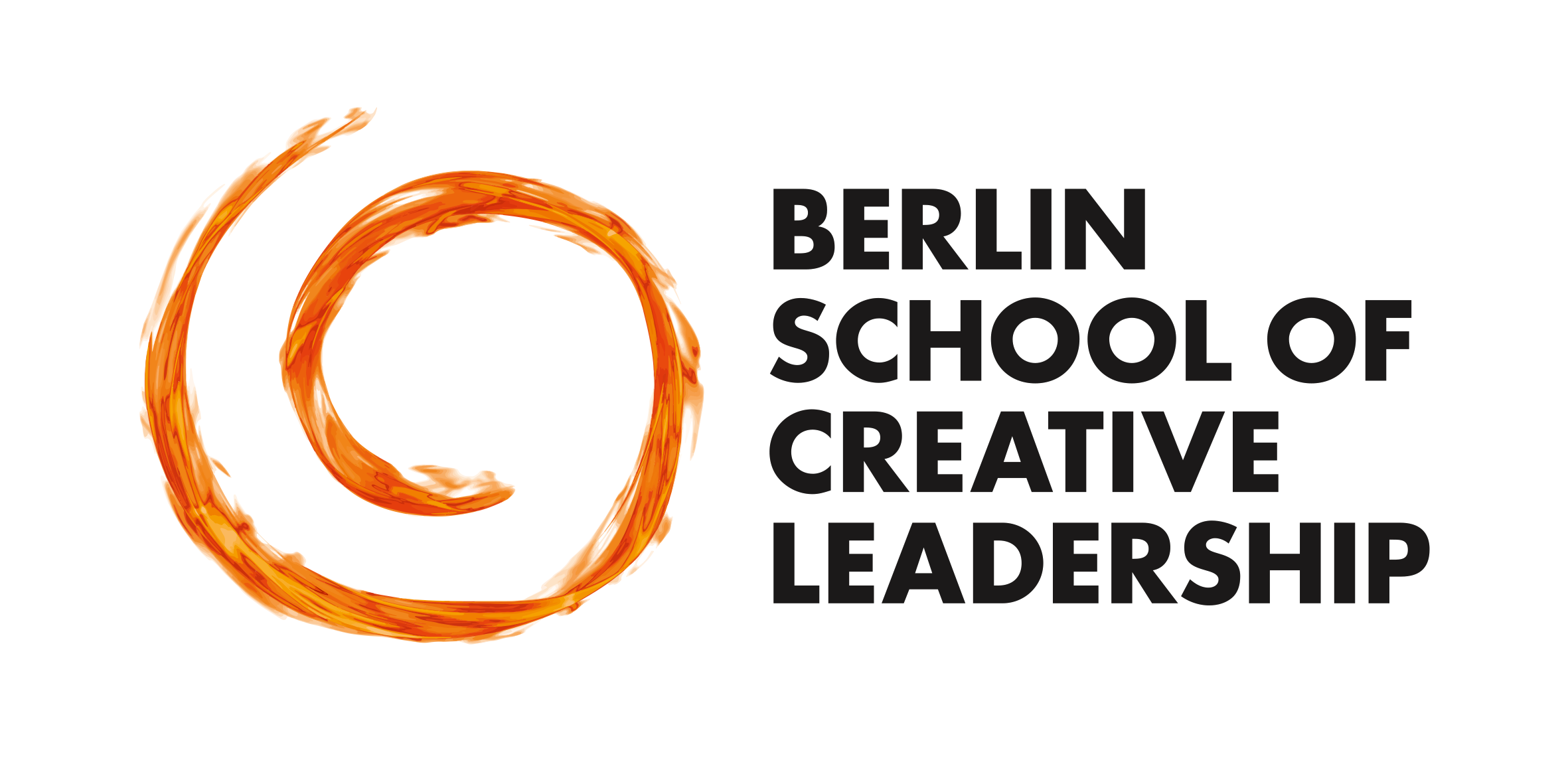
- Motto: Inspire. Implement. Excel.
- Motto in English: To turn great creative minds into great creative leaders.
- Type: Business school
- Established: 2006
- Parent institution: Steinbeis-Hochschule Berlin
- President: Prof. Dr. Jürgen Abendschein
- Location: Berlin, Germany
- Language: English
- Website: https://www.berlin-school.com

The Berlin School of Creative Leadership is a business school within Steinbeis-Hochschule Berlin (SHB), a private, state-approved university in the Charlottenburg area of Berlin, Germany.

== History ==
Founded in 2006 with an initial focus on the advertising industry, the school offers programs in executive education, advertising, media, the arts, and a Global Executive MBA in Creative Leadership. All programs are taught in English.
