= Fondazione Ugo Bordoni =

The Fondazione Ugo Bordoni (Ugo Bordoni Foundation) was founded in 1952 and named after engineering professor Ugo Bordoni of the University of Rome. The Foundation supports scientific research and applications of telecommunications and information technology.

For most of its existence, the Foundation's Board of Directors was composed of representatives of the Ministry of Postal Service and members of the telecommunication sector. Following the establishment of a new charter in 2009, the Board of Directors is nominated by the Ministry for Economic Development on the basis of designations by the President of the Council of Ministers. Industry representatives may still serve as members of the Founders Committee, which consults on strategic issues. The new charter also established a Scientific Committee composed of academics and other members of the research community.

The Foundation is a participant in the TREC 2009 Chemistry Track.
