= Jan-Otmar Hesse =

German historian of economics (born 1968)

Jan-Otmar Hesse (born 6 February 1968) is a German historian of economics.

== Publications ==
Monographs

- with Roman Köster and Werner Plumpe: Die Große Depression. Die Weltwirtschaftskrise 1929–1939. Campus Verlag, Frankfurt among others 2014, ISBN 978-3-593-50162-8.
- Wirtschaftsgeschichte. Entstehung und Wandel der modernen Wirtschaft. (Historische Einführungen. Vol. 15). Campus Verlag, Frankfurt u. a. 2013, ISBN 3-593-39958-X.
- Wirtschaft als Wissenschaft. Die Volkswirtschaftslehre in der frühen Bundesrepublik. (Campus Forschung. Vol. 947). Campus Verlag, Frankfurt 2010, ISBN 978-3-593-39315-5 (zugleich: Habilitationsschrift, Goethe-Universität Frankfurt, 2007).
- Im Netz der Kommunikation. Die Reichs-Post- und Telegraphenverwaltung 1876–1914. (Schriftenreihe zur Zeitschrift für Unternehmensgeschichte. vol. 8). C. H. Beck, Munich 2002, ISBN 3-406-48253-8 (zugleich: Dissertation, Universität Bochum, 1999 under the title: Der institutionelle Wandel der Kommunikationssysteme in Deutschland).
- Kulturalismus, Neue Institutionenökonomik oder Theorienvielfalt : eine Zwischenbilanz der Unternehmensgeschichte.
