= Claus Dierksmeier =

German philosopher (born 1971)

Claus Dierksmeier (born May 17, 1971, in Pforzheim) is a German philosopher. He holds a chair for globalization ethics at the University of Tübingen and works as a strategic consultant in politics and business.

== Career ==
After finishing his dissertation at the University of Hamburg in 1997, Dierksmeier obtained a Dr. phil. habil. degree from the University of Jena in 2002. In 2001 and 2002 he was a visiting scholar at various universities in Spain, Uruguay and Argentina before becoming an associate professor at the Institute for Philosophy at Stonehill College, Boston, where he was subsequently a full professor and "Distinguished Professor of Globalization Ethics" since 2011. In the same year he was appointed as Research Director of the Sustainable Management and Measurement Institute (SUMMIT) at Stonehill College. From 2012 to 2018 he was the academic director of the Weltethos-Institut (Global Ethic Institute) at the University of Tübingen before taking on a chair for globalization ethics at the university's Institute for Political Science.

Dierksmeier is a board member of the international think tank The Humanistic Management Network and Academic Director of the Humanistic Management Center. He is a member of the research group Ethics in Action for Sustainable Development summoned by Jeffrey Sachs on part of the Sustainable Development Solutions Network and the Pontifical Academy of Sciences and he works on the advisory councils of various academic journals and political foundations. In March 2018 he was appointed as a member of the European Academy of Sciences and Arts. As a strategic consultant he has worked, among other things, for the Bruce Henderson Institute of the Boston Consulting Group.

== Research ==
Dierksmeier conducts research on topics of economic and political philosophy as well as globalization ethics. One of his central fields of interest is the concept of Humanistic Management, which he has advanced through various publications. This theory criticizes the 'mechanistic' conception of human behavior in neoclassical economics and advocates for a reorientation towards a 'humanistic' paradigm in management theory and practice.

The foundation of this humanist approach is his theory of Qualitative Freedom. This theory discards the classical dichotomy between positive and negative freedom in order to retrace the history of the idea of liberty along the distinction between quantitative and qualitative freedom. Quantitative conceptions of freedom, Dierksmeier argues, aim principally at maximizing the number of options available to individuals, whereas qualitative approaches are based on the supposition that certain kinds of freedoms have a higher value than others, resulting in different priorities for different liberties. As the required process of assigning different values to different liberties has to follow a liberal procedure itself, it can yield different outcomes in different societies based on the respective societies' conceptions of freedom, which makes the abstract concept of quantitative freedom compatible with various specific implementations in different cultures around the globe.

== Publications (selection) ==
=== Monographs ===
- Qualitative Freiheit. Selbstbestimmung in weltbürgerlicher Verantwortung (Qualitative Freedom. Self-Determination in Cosmopolitan Responsibility). transcript Verlag, Bielefeld 2016, ISBN 978-3837634778.
- Reframing Economic Ethics. The Philosophical Foundations of Humanistic Management. Palgrave Macmillan, London / New York 2016, ISBN 978-3319322995.

=== Articles ===
- Qualitative Freedom and Cosmopolitan Responsibility. In: Humanistic Management Journal, Vol. 2, No. 2, 2018, pp. 109–123 (Link)
- Practical Wisdom. Management's No Longer Forgotten Virtue with Claudius Bachmann and André Habisch. In: Journal of Business Ethics, 12 January 2017 (Link)
- Cryptocurrencies and Business Ethics with Peter Seele. In: Journal of Business Ethics, 13 August 2016 (Link)
- What is 'Humanistic' About Humanistic Management? In: Humanistic Management Journal, Vol. 1, No. 1, 2016, pp. 9–32 (Link)
- Will the Real A. Smith Please Stand Up! with Matthias P. Hühn. In: Journal of Business Ethics, Vol. 136, No. 1, 2016, pp. 119–132 (Link)
- Kant on Virtue. In: Journal of Business Ethics, Vol. 113, No. 4, 2013, pp. 597–609 (Link)
- The Freedom-Responsibility Nexus in Management Philosophy and Business Ethics. In: Journal of Business Ethics, Vol. 101, No. 2, 2011, pp. 263–283 (Link)
- Oikonomia vs Chrematistike. Aristotle on Wealth and Well-Being with Michael Pirson. In: Journal of Business Ethics, Vol. 88, No. 3, 2009, pp. 417–430 (Link)
