= Master of Business Engineering =

A Master of Business Engineering (MBE) also Master of Engineering Management (MEM) is a two-year master's degree. The program combines management science, business administration, law and economics, technology, and engineering. The content of this academic degree is comparable with those of a Master of Business Administration (MBA) with additional engineering and technology content. The standard period of study is 24 months. According to the European Credit Transfer System (ECTS), one hundred twenty credit points are awarded for the degree. It is required to hold a bachelor's degree in business administration or engineering to get admission to this Master's program.

The Master of Business Engineering (MBE) is an emerging degree. The primary objective of the Master's degree program in Management Engineering is to cultivate individuals who possess not only the technical proficiency to apply engineering principles and methodologies, but also possess the aptitude to effectively manage, coordinate, and guide individuals, projects, departments, and enterprises. The course emphasizes the development of effective decision-making abilities in situations characterized by uncertainty.

MBE provides students with the opportunity to acquire knowledge and cultivate skills necessary for the design and management of intricate organizations. This includes aspects such as personnel management, marketing, financial management, production, logistics, project management, and resource allocation. The course aims to equip students with the necessary tools to efficiently address and resolve organizational challenges.The demand for MBE graduates is projected to expand as employers increasingly seek professionals with integrated business and engineering acumen. MBE holders may pursue careers across industries like manufacturing, logistics, energy, healthcare, or consulting. With experience, MBE graduates may ascend and attain top leadership positions within their respective industries, overseeing teams of engineers, managers, and other professionals. Their cross-functional skillset allows them to effectively communicate complex technical concepts to business stakeholders.

The MBE degree is as rigorous as an MBA program, if not more so, and typically requires two years of full-time study to complete. It equips professionals with the skills to lead complex engineering projects and excel in management positions.
