= Steinbeis Foundation =

German academic business incubator

- Steinbeis Foundation for knowledge transfer
- Steinbeis-Stiftung für Wirtschaftsförderung

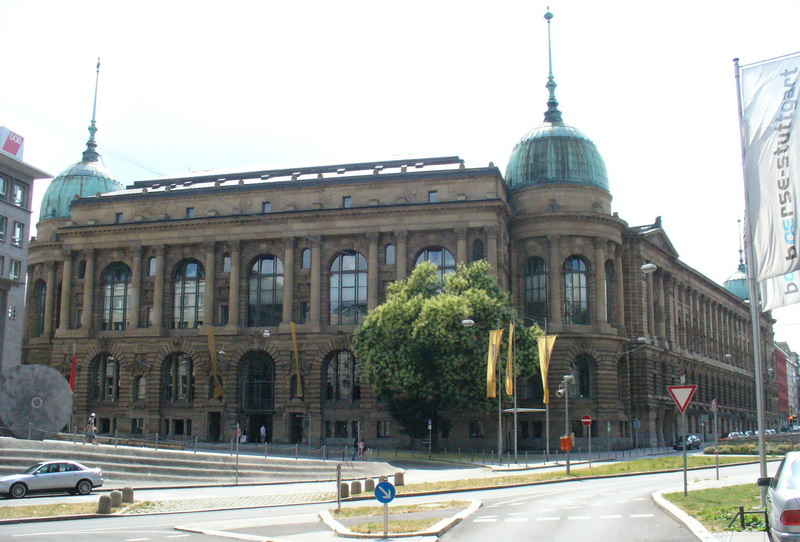
- The Haus der Wirtschaft (House of Commerce) in Central Stuttgart, headquarters of the Steinbeis Foundation amongst other Institutions
- Formation: 1868; 158 years ago (current form 1971)
- Founders: Württemberg industrialists
- Legal status: Legal foundation under German civil law
- Purpose: Knowledge and technology transfer from academia to business
- Location: Stuttgart, Germany
- Region served: Germany and worldwide
- Official language: German
- Funding: Donations from various associations, research institutions and private individuals
- Website: www.steinbeis.de

The Steinbeis Foundation is a German institute headquartered in Stuttgart dedicated to the transfer of academic findings and knowledge into the field of business.

Established in its current form in 1971, the foundation encompasses the Steinbeis-Hochschule Berlin, hundreds of Steinbeis Transfer Centres and Transfer Institutes which operate as stand-alone profit centres. Many are based at German universities of dual education and applied sciences under the directorship of professors who also use the Steinbeis network to attract funding from industry into academic research and study.

== History ==
The Steinbeis Foundation was founded by the State of Baden-Württemberg based on a concept first developed by its patron Ferdinand von Steinbeis (1807-1893). Von Steinbeis set up a variety of vocational colleges in Baden-Württemberg aimed at fostering dual education.

== Investments ==
In 2019, Steinbeis Foundation invested in Teylor, a Swiss-based a digital loan platform and developer of digital financial products and services for the financial services industry.

== Turnover ==
Steinbeis turnover in 2008 totalled 124 million euros generated by a network of 765 Transfer Centres or Research Centres, Advice Centres or Transfer Institutes.

== See also ==
- Baden-Württemberg Cooperative State University
