= Günter Petzow =

German materials scientist (1926–2024)

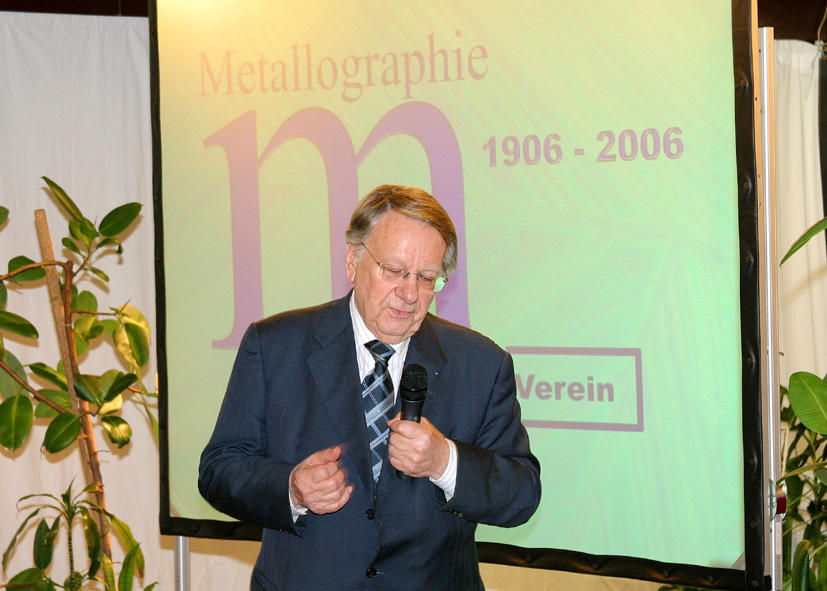
Petzow speaking in 2006

Günter Petzow (8 July 1926 – 4 February 2024) was a German materials scientist and the director at the Max Planck Institute for Metals Research.

== Biography ==
Günter Petzow was born in Nordhausen, Thuringia, on 8 July 1926. He studied Chemistry and Physical Metallurgy at the University of Stuttgart and the Max Planck Institute for Metals Research. He received his master's degree (Dipl.-Ing) in 1956 and finished his dissertation (Dr. rer. nat.) on Phase Equilibria of Quarternary [sic] Metallic Systems in 1959. Afterwards, he took over as the head of two research groups: phase diagrams of metallic systems and metallography in Stuttgart. Furthermore, he built up the Powder Metallurgical Laboratory in Stuttgart-Büsnau as a place of interdisciplinary research, which attracted guest researchers from all over the world. As a result, the current large campus of the MPG has been established. In 1973 he was appointed scientific member of the board of directors of the Max Planck Society. He was executive managing director of Max-Planck-Institute for Metals Research in Stuttgart and also professor at the Universities of Stuttgart and Berlin, where he taught courses in equilibrium phase diagrams and powder metallurgy. His main scientific interests dealt with problems in the field of physical metallurgy, powder metallurgy, special ceramics and phase diagrams of metallic and ceramic materials. He was the author and co-author of more than 600 research papers and 10 books, and held 27 patents.

Some of his most important papers and publications are on phase equilibria between intermetallic compounds to the knowledge of peritectic reactions, constitution and properties of cermets, metallography, high-temperature materials, beryllium and its compounds, liquid phase sintering, particle rearrangement, metallographic etching, toughening of ceramics, Sialon ceramics, sintering of Si_{3}N_{4} ceramics, metal-ceramic interfaces and processing of advanced ceramics. One important achievement was, by using sophisticated reinforcing mechanisms of the originally brittle ceramic, to create a reliable "quasi-ductility" and thus operational capability for excessive mechanical and thermal loads. Prof. Petzow was president of the German Society for Materials and acts on the board of directors of several scientific societies. He was chairman of the European Action COST 507 "Measurement and Evaluation of Thermochemical and Thermophysical Properties to Provide a Database for the Development of New Light Alloys". He was the founding editor of the journal "Practical Metallography", was editor-in-chief of "Zeitschrift für Metallkunde", editor of the book series "Ternary Alloys" and member of several scientific academies and advisory boards. In 1989, he was awarded the Skaupy Prize by the Community Committee Powder Metallurgy for outstanding achievements in the field of powder metallurgy. Petzow received seven honorary doctorates, six honorary professorships and seven honorary memberships in scientific societies. Since 1993 he had been a full member of the Academia Europaea. The "Günter Petzow Prize" for outstanding research is awarded to a young scientist each year at an annual summer colloquium in Stuttgart.

Petzow died on 4 February 2024, at the age of 97.

== Honors ==
=== Prizes and awards ===
- 1977 Kuczynski Diplom from International Institute for the Science of Sintering (IISS) for the best paper 1976/77 on "Particle Rearrangement in Solid State Sintering", Z.f. Metallkde. 67 (1967) 611-618
- 1978 Gottfried Wagner Memorial Lecture, Tokyo Institute of Technology
- 1982 Hume-Rothery Prize from the Institute of Metals, London
- 1982 Henry-Clifton Sorby Award from the Internat. Metallographic Society (IMS) USA
- 1984 Heyn-Denkmünze, the highest distinction from the German Society of Materials, Frankfurt
- 1984 Roland-Mitsche Prize from the Federation of Austrian Metal Industry of Technical and Scientific Union of "Austrian Iron and Steel Industry" and the German Society of Metals, Leoben
- 1986 Research Prize from the Japanese Society for Powder and Powder Metallurgy, Tokyo
- 1987 Arthur-Burkhardt-Prize of the German Science Foundation, Stuttgart
- 1989 Skaupy-Prize for Powder Metallurgy 1989, German Powder Metallurgy Association, Hagen, Westf.
- 1989 ASM-IMS Distinguished Lecturer in Metallography
- 1989 International Prize of the Japanese Fine Ceramics Association, Tokyo
- 1990 Albert Sauveur Achievement Award from the American Society for Materials (ASM International), Materials Park, Ohio
- 1990 1st Class Order for national merits of the President of the Federal Republic of Germany, Bonn
- 1991 The Centennial Award of the Japanese Society of Ceramics, Tokyo
- 1992 Buehler-Prize for the best paper in the Journal Practical Metallography 1991, Dresden
- 1993 Sosman Memorial Lecture, American Ceramic Society, Cincinnati, USA
- 1994 Carl von Bach Gedenkmünze of the Staatliche Materialprüfungsanstalt Stuttgart
- 1994 Medal of the Hungarian Academy of Science (Institute for Technical Physics), Budapest
- 1995 President's Award of the IMS/ASM (Internat. Metaliographic Soc. Inc.) Albuquerque, USA
- 1995 Order of the Rising Sun with Golden Rays and Neck Ribbon of the Japanese Emperor
- 1996 Golden Badge of the Union for Animal Protection
- 1997 Great HONDA-Prize for Distinguished Achievements in the Field of Eco-Technology Honda Foundation, Japan
- 1998 Golden Badge of Honor of the Max Planck Society
- 1998 Plaque of Appreciation of the Korean Ceramic Society
- 2002 - 2003 ISI Highly Cited Author
- 2003 Gold Medal for Merits, Technische Universität Dresden, Germany
- 2004 Golden Badge of Honor of the Hanyang University, Seoul, Korea
- 2005 Medal of Honor for merits in materials research of The Institute of Material Research of the Slovak Academy of Sciences (SAS)

=== Honorary professorships ===
- 1978 Schlumberger Professorship of the University of Michigan, Ann Arbor, USA
- 1986 Honorary Professor of Technische Universität Berlin, Germany
- 1988 Honorary Professor of the Shanghai Institute of Ceramics, Academia Sinica, China
- 1989 ASM-IMS Distinguished Lecturer on Metallography, USA
- 1994 Honorary Professor of the Institute of Metals of the Academia Sinica, Shenyang, China
- 1994 Emeritus Honorary Professor of the University of Stuttgart
- 1998 Research Professor in the Ceramic Materials Research Institute of the Hanyang University, Seoul, Korea
