= Berthold Leibinger Innovationspreis =

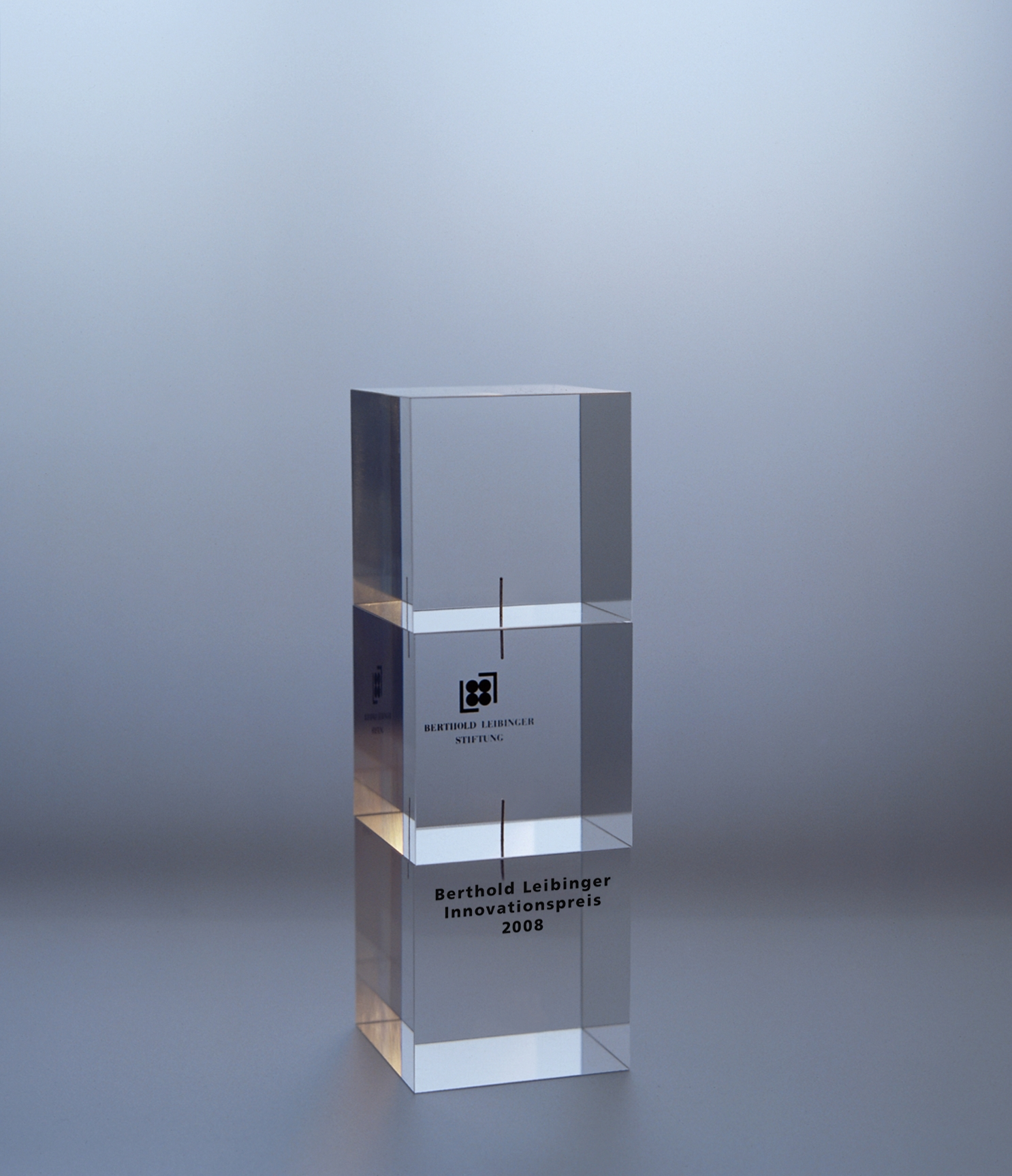
Sculpture of Berthold Leibinger Innovationspreis

The Berthold Leibinger Innovationspreis is an award for given to those who have created applied laser technology and innovations on the application or generation of laser light. It is open to participants worldwide. It is biennially awarded by the German non-profit foundation Berthold Leibinger Stiftung. Three prizes are awarded worth 100,000 euros. The prize winners are selected from eight finalists that present their work person in a jury session. The jury is composed of international experts from different fields.

== Recipients ==
2000 | 2002 | 2004 | 2006 | 2008 | 2010 | 2012 | 2014 | 2016 | 2018 |

=== 2000 ===
First Prize: Josef Schneider, MAN Roland Druckmaschinen AG, "Laser and digitally changed Printing systems"
Second Prize: Martin Grabherr, ULM photonics GmbH, "VCSEL - Vertical Cavity Surface Emitting high-power Laser diode"
Third Prize: Lu Yong Feng, National University of Singapore, "Laser micro processing in industry"

=== 2002 ===
First Prize: Work Group Disk Laser, Universität Stuttgart, "Disk laser"
Second Prize: Tibor Juhasz and Ronald Kurtz, IntraLase Inc., "Femtosecond laser scalpel for Corneal surgery"
Third Prize: Stefan Hell, Marcus Dyba and Alexander Egner, Max Planck Institute for Biophysical Chemistry, "Optical nanoscopy with ultrashort pulse laser and stimulated emission"

=== 2004 ===
First Prize: Ursula Keller, ETH Zurich, "SESAM – Semiconductor Saturable Absorber Mirror for ultrafast lasers"
Second Prize: Andreas Tünnermann, Stefan Nolte and Holger Zellmer, Friedrich-Schiller-University, Jena / Fraunhofer Institute for Applied Optics and Precision Engineering, "High-power fiber lasers and their applications"
Third Prize: Axel Rolle, Specialized Hospital Coswig, Saxony, "Lung parenchymal laser surgery"

=== 2006 ===
First Prize: Karin Schütze and Raimund Schütze, P.A.L.M. Microlaser Technologies GmbH, a Company of the Carl Zeiss MicroImaging GmbH, "Laser micro beam and laser catapult for single cell capture"
Second Prize: Ian A. Walmsley, University of Oxford, "Methods for complete measurement of ultrashort pulses"
Third Prize: Michael Mei and Ronald Holzwarth, Menlo Systems GmbH, "Optical frequency comb technique"

=== 2008 ===
First Prize: Project Group Serial Production with Ultrafast Lasers, Robert Bosch GmbH, "High-Precision Micromachining in Mass Production"
Second Prize: Richard L. Sandstrom, William Partlo, Cymer Inc., "VUV Laser for Advanced Lithography"
Third Prize: Cary Gunn, Luxtera Inc., "Development of CMOS Photonics: Silicon Based Transceivers"
Third Prize: Jürgen Czarske, Lars Büttner, Thorsten Pfister, Technische Universität Dresden, "Laser Doppler Distance Sensor and its Applications"

=== 2010 ===
First Prize: Thorsten Trupke, Robert Bardos, University of New South Wales und BT Imaging Pty Ltd, "Laser Based Luminescence Imaging of Silicon Bricks, Wafers and Solar Cells"
Second Prize: Karsten König, JenLab, "Clinical Multi-Photon Tomography"
Second Prize: Ralph Delmdahl, Rainer Pätzel, Kai Schmidt, Coherent, Alexander Usoskin, Bruker HTS GmbH, "UV Excimer Laser Technology: Key to Massproduction of Ceramic High Temperature Superconducting Tapes"
Third Prize: Majid Ebrahim-Zadeh, Catalan Institute for Research and Advanced Studies und Radiant Light S.L., "Femtosecond Light Source Spanning from the Ultraviolet to Infrared"

=== 2012 ===
First Prize: Fan Tso Yee, Antonio Sanchez-Rubio, Bien Chann, Massachusetts Institute of Technology und TeraDiode Inc., USA, "Dense Wavelength Multiplexing of High Power Diode Laser"
Second Prize: project group InnoSlab Laser, Fraunhofer-Institut für Lasertechnik, Edgewave GmbH and AMPHOS GmbH, "InnoSlab Laser"
Third Prize: Andreas Blug, Felix Abt und Leonardo Nicolosi, Fraunhofer-Institut für Physikalische Messtechnik, Universität Stuttgart, Technische Universität Dresden, "Real-Time Control System for Laser Welding"

=== 2014 ===
First Prize: Alexander A. Oraevsky, TomoWave Laboratories, Inc., USA, "Laser optoacoustic Imaging System"
Second Prize: Helmut Erdl and Abdelmalek Hanafi, BMW Group, Germany, "Vehicular Illumination System Using Semiconductor Laser Diodes"
Third Prize: Tam Hwa-yaw, Ho Siu Lau und Liu Shun-Yee Michael, Photonics Research Centre & Dept. of Electrical Engineering, The Hong Kong Polytechnic University, "Laser Sensing Network for Railway Monitoring"

=== 2016 ===
First Prize: Balthasar Fischer, Xarion Laser Acoustics, Austria, "Membrane-free Optical Microphone"
Second Prize: Garrett Cole and Markus Aspelmeyer, Crystalline Mirror Solutions, University of Vienna, Austria and USA, "Substrate-Transferred Crystalline Coatings – a New Paradigm in Laser-Based Precision Measurement and Instrumentation"
Second Prize: Project Group Direct Laser Interference Patterning (Frank Mücklich et al., Saarland University and Steinbeis Forschungszentrum Material Engineering Center Saarland (MECS), Andrés Lasagni et al., Dresden University of Technology and Fraunhofer-Institut für Werkstoff- und Strahltechnik IWS), Germany, "Development of a Direct Laser Interference Patterning (DLIP) System"
Third Prize: Laser Guide Star Alliance (Wilhelm Kaenders et al., Toptica Photonics, Wallace Clements et al., MPB Communications, Domenico Bonaccini Cala et al., European Southern Observatory), Germany and Canada, "Lasers as Guide Stars for the VLT and other Large and Extremely Large Telescopes (ELT)"

=== 2018 ===
First Prize: Thomas Schopphoven, Andres Gasser, Gerhard Maria Backes, RWTH Aachen, Germany, "Extreme High-speed Laser Material Deposition – EHLA"
Second Prize: Christian Koos (1,2), Alois Hauk (2), Philipp-Immanuel Dietrich (1,2), Nicole Lindenmann (1), Andreas Hofmann (3), Tobias Hoose (1), Muhammad Rodlin Billah (1), Matthias Blaicher (1), Institute of Microstructure Technology (IMT) and Institute of Photonics und Quantum Electronics (IPQ), Karlsruhe Institute of Technology, Karlsruhe, Germany (1) Vanguard Photonics GmbH, Eggenstein-Leopoldshafen, Germany (2) Institute for Automation and Applied Informatics, Karlsruhe Institute of Technology, Eggenstein-Leopoldshafen, Germany (3),"3D Laser Lithography for Photonic Integration – DELPHI"
Third Prize: Jürgen Popp and Ute Neugebauer, Leibniz Institute of Photonic Technology e.V., Jena, Institute of Physical Chemistry (IPC), Friedrich Schiller University Jena, Biophotonics Diagnostics GmbH, Jena, Center for Sepsis Control & Care, Jena University Hospital, Germany, "Faster Assessment of Resistances - RamanBioAssay"

== See also ==
- Berthold Leibinger Zukunftspreis (affiliated research prize)
- Berthold Leibinger (founder of issuing foundation)
- List of engineering awards
- List of physics awards
