= Berthold Leibinger =

German businessman (1930–2018)

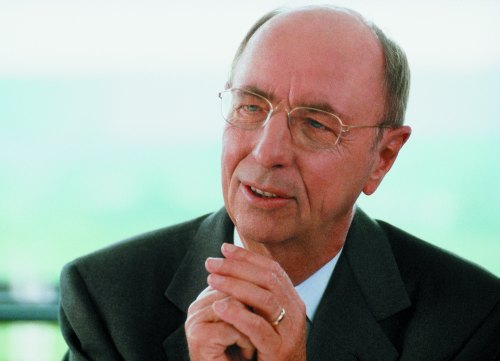
- Born: 26 November 1930; Stuttgart, Baden-Württemberg, Germany
- Died: 16 October 2018 (aged 87); Stuttgart, Germany
- Education: Stuttgart Technology University of Applied Sciences
- Occupations: Head of Trumpf; Founder of Berthold Leibinger Stiftung
- Organizations: Trumpf; Berthold Leibinger Stiftung; University of Stuttgart
- Children: Nicola Leibinger-Kammüller
- Awards: honorary doctorate; Order of Merit of the Federal Republic of Germany; Werner von Siemens Ring; Order of the Rising Sun

Berthold Leibinger (26 November 1930 – 16 October 2018) was a German mechanical engineer, businessman, and philanthropist. He was the head of the German company Trumpf, a leader in laser technology, and founder of the non-profit foundation Berthold Leibinger Stiftung. He served on the advisory board of major companies and was awarded an honorary doctorate by the University of Stuttgart.

== Life ==
Born in Stuttgart, Berthold Leibinger grew up in Korntal with two siblings. He graduated with Abitur at the Ulrich-von-Hutten Gymnasium in Korntal in 1950. He started an apprenticeship as a mechanic at Trumpf and then studied mechanical engineering at the Stuttgart Technology University of Applied Sciences. After graduating with a Diplom, he became a development engineer in 1958 at Cincinnati Milling Machines (today Milacron) in Cincinnati. In 1961 he returned to Germany and to Trumpf as head of the engineering division. In 1968 he developed the first contour nibbling machine tool with numerical control. The owner of the company, Christian Trumpf, having no children, named Leibinger as his successor. Leibinger successively took over shares of the company and served as technical director from 1966. He was managing director and partner from 1978. On 18 November 2005, he retired from management and served as chairman of the supervisory board of the Trumpf Group until the end of 2012. On 16 October 2018, he died in Stuttgart at the age of 87.

== Entrepreneurial and engineering achievements ==
Under the management of Leibinger, Trumpf became one of the world's largest manufacturers of machine tools, in particular due to the consequent combination of mechanics and electronics. Trumpf is also one of the largest manufacturers of industrial laser technology and machines for laser cutting.

Leibinger was appointed to several important political and economical positions. From 1985 to 1990 he was president of the Chamber of Commerce of the Stuttgart Region and from 1989 to 1992 he served as president of the German Association of Machinery Manufacturers VDMA. He was a member of the supervisory boards of Deutsche Bank and BMW, among other companies. From 1999 to 2003 he was chairman of the supervisory board of the chemical company BASF. He was also president of the Stuttgart Chamber of Commerce and Industry from 1990 to 1992. He served in the senate of the University of Stuttgart starting in 2000.

== Philanthropy ==
Leibinger was a philanthropist with long lasting involvement in German culture. He was personally involved as chairman of the board of the Schiller-Nationalmuseum and the Deutsches Literaturarchiv in Marbach am Neckar.

In 1992 Leibinger founded the non-profit foundation Berthold Leibinger Stiftung. It is dedicated to cultural, scientific, religious and social issues. Since 2000, it has awarded the internationally respected Berthold Leibinger Innovationspreis and, since 2006, the Berthold Leibinger Zukunftspreis, an innovation prize for applied laser technology.

== Awards ==
In July 1990, in a motion brought forward by the Faculty of Engineering and Manufacturing Technology, he was awarded an honorary PhD degree of the University of Stuttgart. In January 1996, the Minister President of the state of Baden-Württemberg conferred upon him the honorary title of Professor. The Konrad Adenauer Foundation awarded him their Prize for Social Market Economy in November 2003. In October 2006, the president of the Federal Republic of Germany awarded him the Knight Commander's Cross (Badge and Star) of the Order of Merit of the Federal Republic of Germany (Bundesverdienstkreuz). In December 2006, the Werner-von-Siemens-Ring Stiftung awarded him Germany's most important technology award, the Werner von Siemens Ring. In November 2007 the Aktionsgemeinschaft Soziale Marktwirtschaft [Society of Social Market Economy] awarded him the Alexander-Rüstow-Plakette. In June 2008 he was awarded the Deutscher Gründerpreis, and in 2011 the Arthur L. Schawlow Award from the Laser Institute of America. He received the Preis für Verständigung und Toleranz of the Jewish Museum, Berlin, in 2013, and the Aachener Ingenieurpreis in 2014. He was awarded the Japanese Order of the Rising Sun in 2016.

== Publications ==
His publications, including an autobiography and a dissertation, are held by the German National Library:

- Wer wollte eine andere Zeit als diese. Ein Lebensbericht. Murmann Verlag, Hamburg 2010, ISBN 978-3-86774-103-3.
- Erfahrungen, Erfolge, Entwicklungen – Der Weg der Werkzeugmaschinenindustrien in Deutschland, Japan und den USA. Wallstein Verlag, Göttingen 2014, ISBN 978-3-8353-1660-7.
