= Federico Capasso =

Italian applied physicist

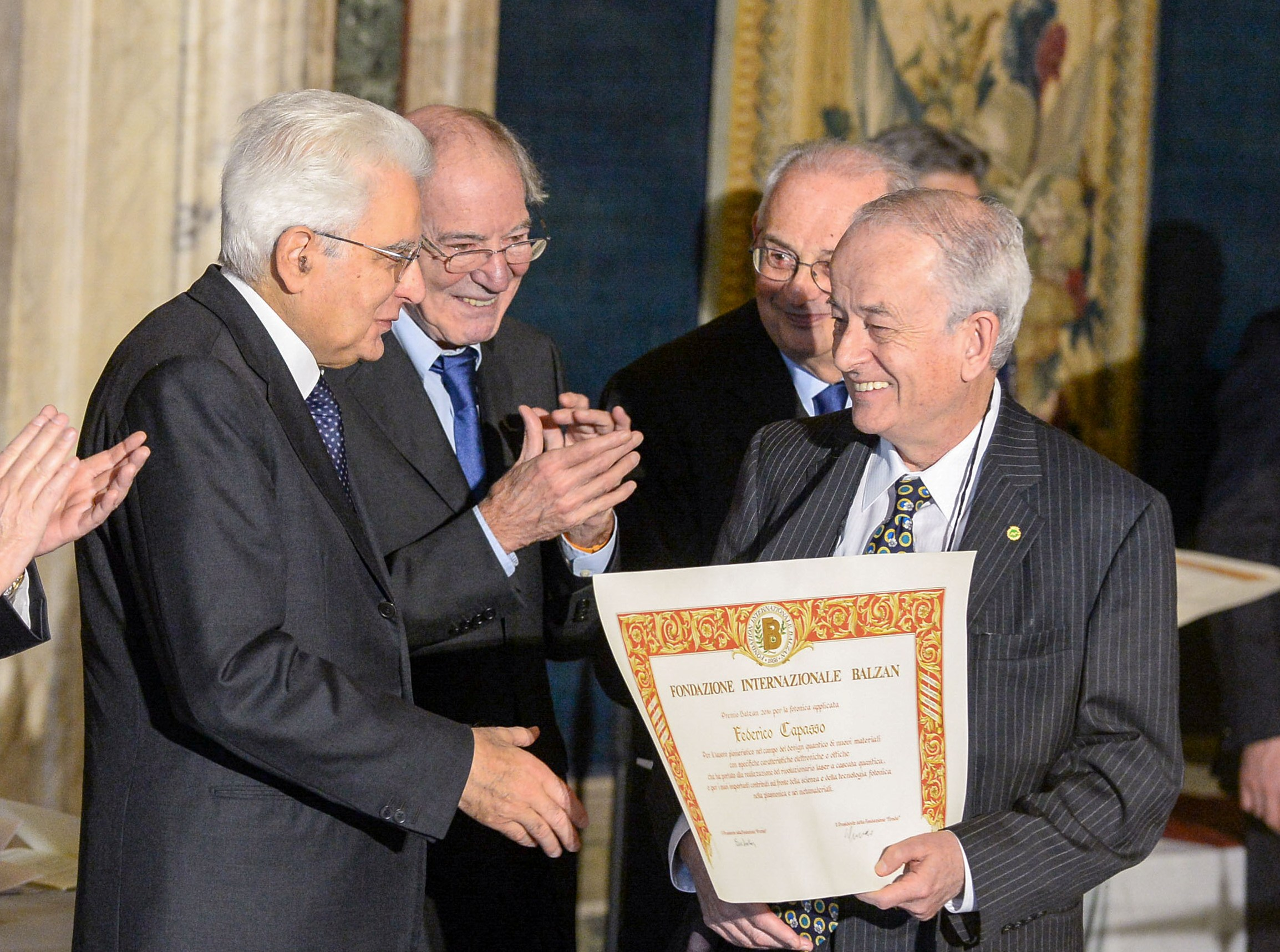
- Capasso in 2016
- Born: 1949 (age 76–77); Rome, Italy
- Education: University of Rome
- Known for: Quantum cascade laser; band gap engineering; repulsive Casimir forces; Wavefront engineering using plasmonics
- Awards: IEEE David Sarnoff Award (1993); Newcomb Cleveland Prize (1993); John Price Wetherill Medal (1997); Rank Prize for Optoelectronics (1998); R. W. Wood Prize (2001); Duddell Medal and Prize (2002); Arthur L- Schawlow Prize (2004); Edison Medal (2004); King Faisal Prize (2004); Tomassoni award (2004); Berthold Leibinger Zukunftspreis (2010); SPIE Gold Medal (2013); Balzan Prize (2016); Enrico Fermi Prize (2018); Matteucci Medal (2019); Frederic Ives Medal (2019)
- Scientific career
- Fields: Applied physics
- Workplaces: Fondazione Ugo Bordoni; Bell Laboratories; Harvard University

Federico Capasso (born 1949) is an Italian-American applied physicist and is one of the inventors of the quantum cascade laser during his work at Bell Laboratories. He is currently on the faculty of Harvard University.

== Biography ==
Federico Capasso received the Doctor of Physics degree, summa cum laude, from the University of Rome, Italy, in 1973 and after doing research in fiber optics at Fondazione Ugo Bordoni in Rome, joined Bell Labs in 1976.

In 1984, he was made a distinguished member of technical staff and in 1997 a Bell Labs Fellow. In addition to his research activity, Capasso has held several management positions at Bell Labs, including head of the quantum phenomena and device research department and the semiconductor physics research department (1987–2000) and vice president of physical research (2000–2002). He joined Harvard on 1 January 2003.

He and his collaborators made many wide-ranging contributions to semiconductor devices, pioneering the design technique known as band-structure engineering. He applied it to novel low noise quantum well avalanche photodiodes, heterojunction transistors, memory devices and lasers. He and his collaborators invented and demonstrated the quantum cascade laser (QCL). Unlike conventional semiconductor lasers, known as diode lasers, which rely on the band gap of the semiconductor to emit light, the wavelength of QCLs is determined by the energy separation between conduction band quantized states in quantum wells. In 1971 researchers postulated that such an emission process could be used for laser amplification in a superlattice. The QCL wavelength can be tailored across a wide range from the mid-infrared to the far infrared by changing the quantum well thickness. The mature technology of the QCL is now finding commercial applications. QCLs have become the most widely used sources of mid-infrared radiation for chemical sensing and spectroscopy and are commercially available. They operate at temperatures in excess of 100°C and emit up to several watts of power in continuous wave.

Capasso's current research in quantum electronics deals with very high power continuous-wave QCLs, the design of new light sources based on giant optical nonlinearities in quantum wells such as widely tunable sources of terahertz radiation based on difference frequency generation and with plasmonics. He and his group at Harvard have demonstrated a new class of optical antennas and plasmonic collimators that they have used to design the near-field and far-field of semiconductor lasers, achieving ultrahigh intensity deep subwavelength size laser spots, laser beams with greatly reduced divergence and multibeam lasers. His group showed that suitably designed plasmonic interfaces consisting of optically thin arrays of optical nano-antennas lead to a powerful generalization of the centuries-old laws of reflection and refraction. They form the basis of "flat optics" based on metasurfaces.

Federico Capasso has made major contributions to the study of quantum electrodynamical forces known as Casimir forces. He used the Casimir effect (the attraction between metal surfaces in vacuum due to its zero point energy) to control the motion of MicroElectroMechanical Systems (MEMS). He demonstrated novel devices (Casimir actuators and oscillators), setting limits to the scaling of MEMs technology and with his collaborators Jeremy Munday and Adrian Parsegian was the first to measure a repulsive Casimir force.

== Awards and honors ==
His honors include membership in the National Academy of Sciences, the American Academy of Arts and Sciences, the European Academy of Sciences and honorary membership in the Franklin Institute. He was also elected a member of the National Academy of Engineering (1995) for contributions to solid-state electronics and optoelectronics through semiconductor 'bandgap engineering.'

In 2004, he received the Chisesi-Tomassoni award for his pioneering work on the quantum-cascade laser. In 2005 he received, jointly with Nobel Laureates Frank Wilczek (MIT) and Anton Zeilinger (University of Vienna), the King Faisal International Prize for Science for his research on quantum cascade lasers. The citation called him "one of the most creative and influential physicists in the world."

On behalf of the American Physical Society, he was awarded the 2004 Arthur L. Schawlow Prize in Laser Science, endowed by the NEC Corporation, for "seminal contributions to the invention and demonstration of the quantum cascade laser and the elucidation of its physics, which bridges quantum electronics, solid-state physics, and materials science."

SPIE, the international society of optics and photonics, selected Capasso to receive the 2013 SPIE Gold Medal, the highest honor the society bestows.

In addition, the IEEE (Institute of Electrical and Electronics Engineers), the world's largest technical professional organization, named Capasso the recipient of the 2004 IEEE Edison Medal with the following citation, "For a career of highly creative and influential contributions to heterostructure devices and materials."

He is also recipient of the John Price Wetherill Medal of the Franklin Institute, the R. W. Wood Prize of the Optical Society of America, the IEEE Lasers and Electro-Optics Society W. Streifer Award for Scientific Achievement, the Materials Research Society Medal, the Rank Prize in Optoelectronics (UK), the Duddell Medal and Prize of the Institute of Physics (UK), The Willis Lamb Medal for Laser Science and Quantum Optics, the Newcomb Cleveland Prize of the American Association for the Advancement of Science, the 1995 Moet Hennessy-Louis Vuitton "Leonardo da Vinci" Prize (France), the Welker Memorial Medal (Germany), the New York Academy of Sciences Award, the IEEE David Sarnoff Award in Electronics, and the Goff Smith prize of the University of Michigan. In 2010 he received the Berthold Leibinger Zukunftspreis for research in applied laser technology and the Julius Springer Prize in Applied Physics. In 2011 he received the Jan Czochralski Medal of the European Materials Research society for his lifetime achievements in Materials Science.

In 2016 he was awarded the Balzan Prize for Applied Photonics "For his pioneering work in the quantum design of new materials with specific electronic and optical features, which led to the realization of a fundamentally new class of laser, the Quantum Cascade Laser; for his major contributions in plasmonics and metamaterials at the forefront of photonics science and technology". He received the Matteucci Medal in 2019 from the Italian National Academy of Sciences for his invention of the quantum cascade laser.

He is a Fellow of the American Physical Society, the Institute of Physics (UK), the Optical Society of America, the American Association for the Advancement of Science, IEEE and SPIE. He holds honorary doctorates from Lund University, Sweden, the Diderot University (Paris VII), France, the University of Bologna, Italy and the University of Torvergata (Roma II), Italy.

I󠄲󠅀󠄢󠄪󠅞󠄣󠅥󠄣󠅚󠄧󠅜󠅓󠅑󠅞󠅠󠅪󠅒󠄧󠅨󠅑︋󠄗󠆞󠆨󠇔󠅫󠇪󠆐️󠄑󠄛󠆺󠄄󠄺󠅄󠅎󠄏󠄢󠄓󠄁󠄲󠇎󠅼︆︎󠄣󠇔󠅌󠆃︈󠆱󠆄󠄆󠇈󠄱󠇖󠅂󠄑󠅙󠄒󠆱󠄼󠅊󠇌󠆒︌󠅇󠄢󠆣󠇒󠄶󠆌󠅚󠄩󠅐󠆃󠇙󠆜︆󠅦󠄍󠇡︈󠇢n 2022, Capasso received the Frederic Ives Medal/Jarus W. Quinn Prize from the Optical Society of America for seminal and wide-ranging contributions to optical physics, quantum electronics and nanophotonics.

== Bibliography ==
- Capasso, Federico (2005). Avventure di un designer quantico (in Italian). Di Renzo. ISBN 978-88-8323-105-6.
- Yu, Nanfang; Capasso, Federico (2014). "Flat optics with designer metasurfaces". Nat. Mater. 13 (2): 139–50. Bibcode:2014NatMa..13..139Y. doi:10.1038/nmat3839. PMID 24452357.
