= Emil Heyn =

German metallurgist

Friedrich Emil Heyn (5 July 1867 – 1 March 1922) was a German metallurgist who introduced the quantitative metallurgy and is considered a pioneer of metallography techniques including the intercept method where the number of grains cutting a known length of random line segment is used to characterize the fine grain structure of metal alloys.

Heyn was born in Annaberg the son of tailor Wilhelm and his wife Johanna Hoyer. The family later moved to Freiberg where Heyn was educated at the Freiberg Mining School, training under Adolf Ledebur, and went to work at Krupp, Essen followed by Hoerder Ironworks before becoming a lecturer at the School of Engineering at Gleiwitz. He visited Sweden in 1890 to study gold mining and he also learned typing and stenography, achieving a speed of 80 to 100 words per minute of dictation. In 1898 he joined the Technische Hochschule in Charlottenburg (now Technische Universität Berlin). Here his main work was on examining metal surfaces under a microscope along with Henry Clifton Sorby and Adolf Martens. In 1904, a Material Testing Office was begun with Heyn as the head of the department of metallography. In 1912 he contributed to the second volume of Martens' Handbook of Metallography. In 1922, inspired by the X-ray diffraction work of Max von Laue, he set up radiographic studies of metals. Heyn knew several European languages.

Heyn married Elfriede Papenheim in 1895.
