= Sulfide mineral =

Class of minerals containing sulfide or disulfide as the major anion

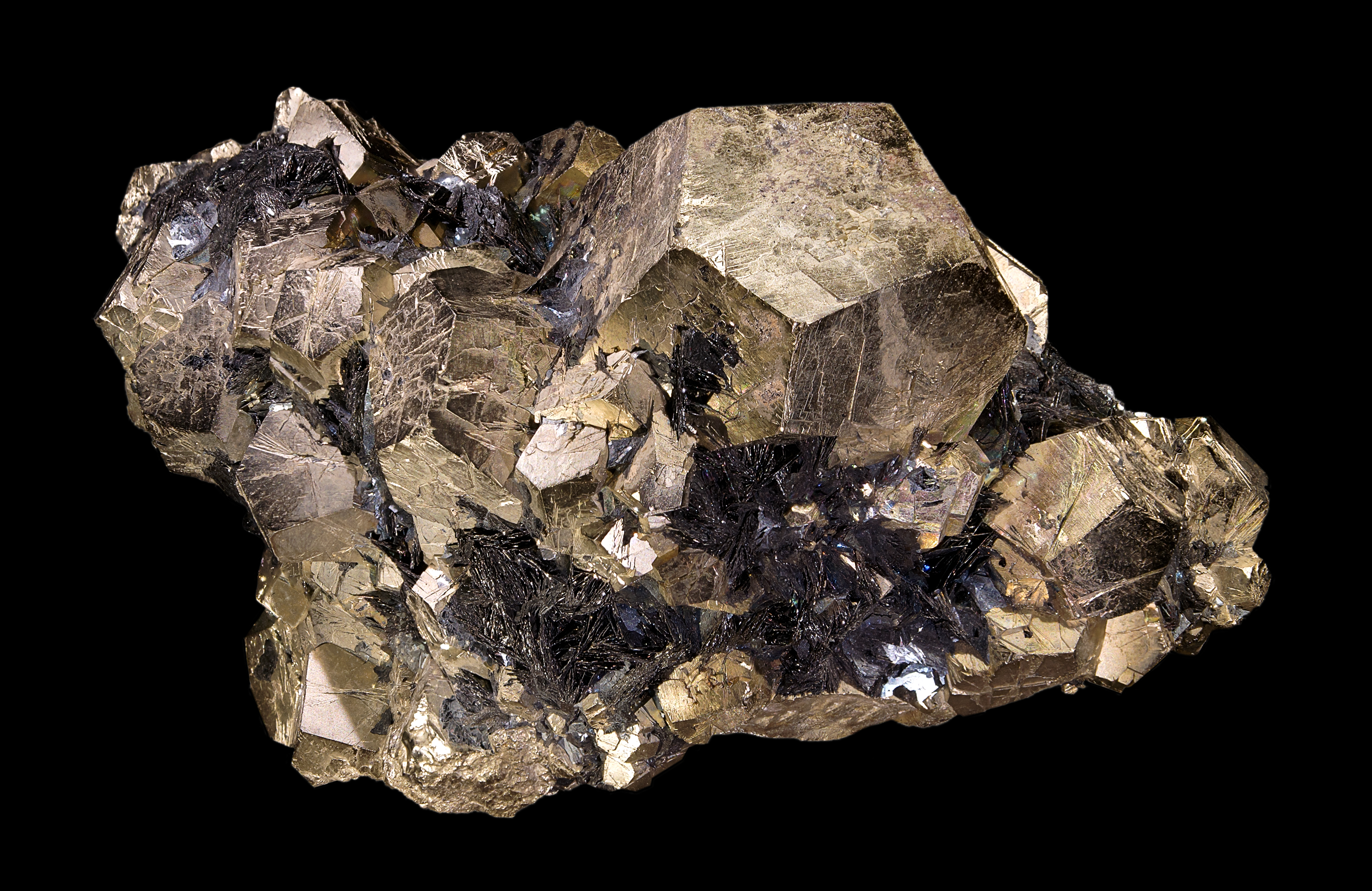
Pyrite

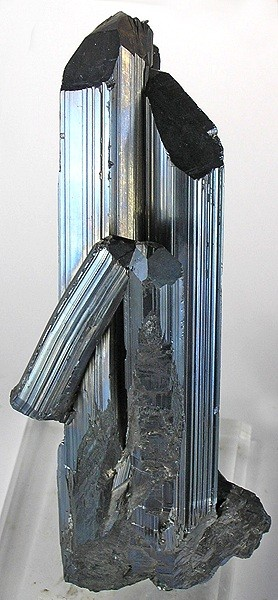
Stibnite

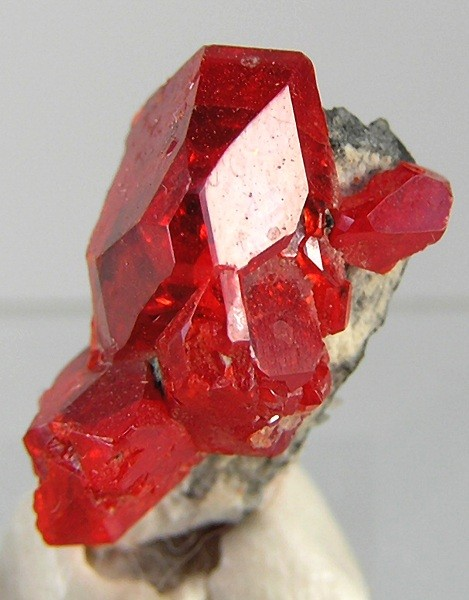
Realgar

The sulfide minerals are a class of minerals containing sulfide (S^{2−}) or disulfide (S^{2−}_{2}) as the major anion. Some sulfide minerals are economically important as metal ores. The sulfide class also includes the selenides, the tellurides, the arsenides, the antimonides, the bismuthinides, the sulfarsenides and the sulfosalts. Sulfide minerals are inorganic compounds.

== Minerals ==
Common or important examples include:

- Acanthite Ag_{2}S
- Chalcocite Cu_{2}S
- Bornite Cu_{5}FeS_{4}
- Galena PbS
- Sphalerite ZnS
- Chalcopyrite CuFeS_{2}
- Pyrrhotite Fe_{1–x}S
- Millerite NiS
- Pentlandite (Fe,Ni)_{9}S_{8}
- Covellite CuS
- Cinnabar HgS
- Realgar AsS
- Orpiment As_{2}S_{3}
- Stibnite Sb_{2}S_{3}
- Pyrite FeS_{2}
- Marcasite FeS_{2}
- Molybdenite MoS_{2}

Sulfarsenides:

- Cobaltite (Co,Fe)AsS
- Arsenopyrite FeAsS
- Gersdorffite NiAsS

Sulfosalts:

- Pyrargyrite Ag_{3}SbS_{3}
- Proustite Ag_{3}AsS_{3}
- Tetrahedrite Cu_{12}Sb_{4}S_{13}
- Tennantite Cu_{12}As_{4}S_{13}
- Enargite Cu_{3}AsS_{4}
- Bournonite PbCuSbS_{3}
- Jamesonite Pb_{4}FeSb_{6}S_{14}
- Cylindrite Pb_{3}Sn_{4}FeSb_{2}S_{14}

== Nickel–Strunz Classification -02- Sulfides ==
IMA-CNMNC proposes a new hierarchical scheme (Mills et al., 2009). This list uses the Classification of Nickel–Strunz (mindat.org, 10 ed, pending publication).

- Abbreviations:
  - "*" - discredited (IMA/CNMNC status).
  - "?" - questionable/doubtful (IMA/CNMNC status).
  - "REE" - Rare-earth element (Sc, Y, La, Ce, Pr, Nd, Pm, Sm, Eu, Gd, Tb, Dy, Ho, Er, Tm, Yb, Lu)
  - "PGE" - Platinum-group element (Ru, Rh, Pd, Os, Ir, Pt)
  - 03.C Aluminofluorides, 06 Borates, 08 Vanadates (04.H V^{[5,6]} Vanadates), 09 Silicates:
    - Neso: insular (from Greek νησος nēsos, island)
    - Soro: grouping (from Greek σωροῦ sōros, heap, mound (especially of corn))
    - Cyclo: ring
    - Ino: chain (from Greek ις [genitive: ινος inos], fibre)
    - Phyllo: sheet (from Greek φύλλον phyllon, leaf)
    - Tekto: three-dimensional framework
- Nickel–Strunz code scheme: NN.XY.##x
  - NN: Nickel–Strunz mineral class number
  - X: Nickel–Strunz mineral division letter
  - Y: Nickel–Strunz mineral family letter
  - ##x: Nickel–Strunz mineral/group number, x add-on letter

=== Class: sulfides, selenides, tellurides ===
- 02.A Simple Sulfides, Selenides, etc.
  - 02.AA Alloys of metalloids with Cu, Ag, Sn, Au: 10a Algodonite, 10b Domeykite, 10d Koutekite; 15 Novakite, 20 Cuprostibite, 25 Kutinaite, 30 Allargentum, 35 Dyscrasite, 40 Maldonite, 45 Stistaite
  - 02.AB Ni-metalloid alloys: 10 Orcelite, 15 Maucherite, 20 Oregonite
  - 02.AC Alloys of metalloids with PGE: 05a Atheneite, 05a Vincentite; 10a Stillwaterite, 10b Mertieite-II, 10c Arsenopalladinite; 15a Miessiite, 15a Isomertieite, 15b Mertieite-I; 20a Stibiopalladinite, 20b Palarstanide, 20c Menshikovite; 25a Palladoarsenide, 25b Rhodarsenide, 25c Palladodymite, 25d Naldretteite, 25e Majakite, 25f Palladobismutharsenide; 30 Polkanovite; 35a Genkinite, 35b Ungavaite, 40 Polarite; 45a Froodite, 45b Iridarsenite, 45c Borishanskiite
- 02.B Metal Sulfides, M:S > 1:1 (mainly 2:1)
  - 02.BA With Cu, Ag, Au: 05a Chalcocite, 05b Djurleite, 05c Geerite, 05d Roxbyite, 05e Digenite, 05f Anilite; 10 Bornite; 15a Berzelianite, 15b Bellidoite, 15c Umangite, 15d Athabascaite; 20a Rickardite, 20b Weissite; 25a Stromeyerite, 25b Mckinstryite, 25c Selenojalpaite, 25c Jalpaite, 25d Eucairite, 25e Henryite; 30a Acanthite, 30a Argentite*, 30b Aguilarite, 30b Naumannite, 30c Hessite, 30d Cervelleite, 30e Stutzite; 35 Argyrodite, 35 Putzite, 35 Canfieldite; 40a Fischesserite, 40a Petzite, 40b Uytenbogaardtite, 40c Petrovskaite, 40d Penzhinite; 45 Bezsmertnovite, 50 Bogdanovite, 55 Bilibinskite, 60 Chenguodaite
  - 02.BB With Ni, Fe: 05 Heazlewoodite; 10 Arsenohauchecornite, 10 Bismutohauchecornite, 10 Hauchecornite, 10 Tellurohauchecornite, 10 Tucekite; 15a Argentopentlandite, 15a Cobaltpentlandite, 15a Geffroyite, 15a Manganoshadlunite, 15a Pentlandite, 15a Shadlunite, 15b Godlevskite, 15c Sugakiite; 20 Vozhminite
  - 02.BC With Rh, Pd, Pt, etc.: 05 Palladseite, 05 Miassite; 10 Oosterboschite; 15 Jagueite, 15 Chrisstanleyite; 20 Keithconnite, 25 Vasilite, 30 Telluropalladinite, 35 Luberoite, 40 Oulankaite, 45 Telargpalite, 50 Temagamite, 55 Sopcheite, 60 Laflammeite, 65 Tischendorfite, 70 Kharaelakhite
  - 02.BD With Hg, Tl: 05 Imiterite, 10 Gortdrumite; 15 Balkanite, 15 Danielsite; 20 Donharrisite, 25 Carlinite; 30 Bukovite, 30 Thalcusite, 30 Murunskite; 35 Rohaite, 40 Chalcothallite, 45 Sabatierite, 50 Crookesite, 55 Brodtkorbite
  - 02.BE With Pb(Bi): 05 Betekhtinite, 10 Furutobeite; 15 Rhodplumsite, 15 Shandite; 20 Parkerite, 25 Schlemaite, 30 Pasavaite
- 02.C Metal Sulfides, M:S = 1:1 (and similar)
  - 02.CA With Cu: 05a Covellite, 05b Klockmannite, 05c Spionkopite, 05d Yarrowite; 10 Nukundamite, 15 Calvertite
  - 02.CB With Zn, Fe, Cu, Ag, Au, etc.: 05a Rudashevskyite, 05a Hawleyite, 05a Coloradoite, 05a Metacinnabar, 05a Sphalerite, 05a Tiemannite, 05a Stilleite, 05b Sakuraiite, 05c Polhemusite; 07.0 Arsenosulvanite?; 10a Chalcopyrite, 10a Eskebornite, 10a Gallite, 10a Lenaite, 10a Roquesite, 10a Laforetite, 10b Haycockite, 10b Mooihoekite, 10b Putoranite, 10b Talnakhite; 15a Cernyite, 15a Hocartite, 15a Kuramite, 15a Pirquitasite, 15a Stannite, 15a Velikite, 15a Idaite, 15a Ferrokesterite, 15a Kesterite, 15b Mohite, 15c Stannoidite; 20 Chatkalite, 20 Mawsonite; 30 Colusite, 30 Germanite, 30 Germanocolusite, 30 Nekrasovite, 30 Stibiocolusite, 30 Maikainite, 30 Ovamboite; 35a Hemusite, 35a Kiddcreekite, 35a Renierite, 35a Polkovicite, 35a Morozeviczite, 35a Catamarcaite, 35a Vinciennite; 40 Lautite; 45 Cadmoselite, 45 Rambergite, 45 Greenockite, 45 Wurtzite; 55a Cubanite, 55b Isocubanite; 60 Picotpaulite, 60 Raguinite; 65 Argentopyrite, 65 Sternbergite; 70 Sulvanite, 75 Vulcanite, 80 Empressite, 85 Muthmannite
  - 02.CC With Ni, Fe, Co, PGE, etc.: 05 Zlatogorite, 05 Breithauptite, 05 Freboldite, 05 Langisite, 05 Nickeline, 05 Sederholmite, 05 Stumpflite, 05 Sudburyite, 05 Sobolevskite, 05 Achavalite, 05 Jaipurite*, 05 Hexatestibiopanickelite, 05 Kotulskite; 10 Smythite, 10 Pyrrhotite, 10 Troilite; 15 Cherepanovite, 15 Modderite, 15 Ruthenarsenite, 15 Westerveldite; 20 Makinenite, 20 Millerite; 25 Mackinawite, 30 Vavrinite; 35a Braggite, 35a Cooperite, 35a Vysotskite
  - 02.CD With Sn, Pb, Hg, etc.: 05 Herzenbergite, 05 Teallite; 10 Altaite, 10 Galena, 10 Clausthalite, 10 Alabandite, 10 Niningerite, 10 Oldhamite, 10 Keilite; 15a Cinnabar, 15b Hypercinnabar
- 02.D Metal Sulfides, M:S = 3:4 and 2:3
  - 02.DA M:S = 3:4: 05 Bornhardtite, 05 Florensovite, 05 Carrollite, 05 Fletcherite, 05 Daubréelite, 05 Greigite, 05 Linnaeite, 05 Kalininite, 05 Polydymite, 05 Violarite, 05 Tyrrellite, 05 Siegenite, 05 Trustedtite, 05 Cadmoindite, 05 Cuproiridsite, 05 Cuprorhodsite, 05 Dayingite*, 05 Ferrorhodsite, 05 Indite, 05 Malanite, 05 Xingzhongite; 10 Rhodostannite, 10 Toyohaite; 15 Wilkmanite, 15 Brezinaite, 15 Heideite; 20 Inaglyite, 20 Konderite; 25 Kingstonite
  - 02.DB M:S = 2:3 and similar: 05 Heklaite, 05a Antimonselite, 05a Guanajuatite, 05a Bismuthinite, 05a Stibnite, 05a Metastibnite, 05b Paakkonenite; 10 Ottemannite, 10 Suredaite; 15 Bowieite, 15 Kashinite; 20 Montbrayite, 25 Edgarite, 30 Tarkianite, 35 Cameronite
  - 02.DC Variable M:S: 05 Platynite?, 05a Hedleyite, 05b Nevskite, 05b Telluronevskite, 05b Ingodite, 05b Sulphotsumoite, 05b Tsumoite, 05c Kawazulite, 05c Paraguanajuatite, 05c Skippenite, 05c Tetradymite, 05c Tellurantimony, 05c Tellurobismuthite, 05d Laitakarite, 05d Ikunolite, 05d Joseite, 05d Joseite-B, 05d Pilsenite, 05e Vihorlatite, 05e Baksanite, 05e Protojoseite*, 05e Sztrokayite*
- 02.E Metal Sulfides, M:S £1:2
  - 02.EA M:S = 1:2: 05 Sylvanite, 10 Calaverite; 15 Krennerite, 15 Kostovite; 20 Berndtite, 20 Merenskyite, 20 Melonite, 20 Kitkaite, 20 Moncheite, 20 Sudovikovite, 20 Shuangfengite; 25 Verbeekite; 30 Drysdallite, 30 Jordisite, 30 Molybdenite, 30 Tungstenite
  - 02.EB M:S = 1:2, with Fe, Co, Ni, PGE, etc.: 05a Aurostibite, 05a Cattierite, 05a Hauerite, 05a Fukuchilite, 05a Erlichmanite, 05a Geversite, 05a Insizwaite, 05a Laurite, 05a Krutaite, 05a Pyrite, 05a Penroseite, 05a Sperrylite, 05a Vaesite, 05a Villamaninite, 05a Trogtalite, 05a Dzharkenite, 05a Gaotaiite, 05b Bambollaite; 10a Frohbergite, 10a Hastite?, 10a Ferroselite, 10a Kullerudite, 10a Mattagamite, 10a Marcasite, 10b Alloclasite, 10c Glaucodot, 10d Costibite, 10e Pararammelsbergite, 10e Paracostibite, 10f Oenite; 15a Clinosafflorite, 15a Anduoite, 15a Omeiite, 15a Lollingite, 15a Nisbite, 15a Rammelsbergite, 15a Safflorite, 15b Seinajokite; 20 Paxite, 20 Arsenopyrite, 20 Gudmundite, 20 Ruarsite, 20 Osarsite; 25 Krutovite, 25 Cobaltite, 25 Changchengite, 25 Hollingworthite, 25 Gersdorffite, 25 Irarsite, 25 Jolliffeite, 25 Padmaite, 25 Platarsite, 25 Ullmannite, 25 Tolovkite, 25 Willyamite, 25 Milotaite, 25 Kalungaite, 25 Maslovite, 25 Testibiopalladite, 25 Michenerite, 25 Mayingite; 30 Urvantsevite, 35 Rheniite
  - 02.EC M:S = 1:>2: 05 Ferroskutterudite, 05 Kieftite, 05 Dienerite?, 05 Nickelskutterudite, 05 Skutterudite; 10 Patronite
- 02.F Sulfides of Arsenic, Alkalies; Sulfides with Halide, Oxide, Hydroxide, H_{2}O
  - 02.FA With As, (Sb), S: 05 Duranusite, 10 Dimorphite, 15a Realgar, 15b Pararealgar, 20 Alacranite, 25 Uzonite; 30 Laphamite, 30 Orpiment; 35 Getchellite, 40 Wakabayashilite
  - 02.FB With Alkalies (without Cl, etc.): 05 Cronusite, 05 Caswellsilverite, 05 Schollhornite; 10 Chvilevaite, 15 Orickite; 20 Rasvumite, 20 Pautovite; 25 Colimaite
  - 02.FC With Cl, Br, I (halide-sulfides): 05 Djerfisherite, 05 Owensite, 05 Thalfenisite; 10 Bartonite, 10 Chlorbartonite; 15a Arzakite, 15a Corderoite, 15a Lavrentievite, 15b Kenhsuite, 15c Grechishchevite, 15d Radtkeite; 20a Capgaronnite, 20b Iltisite, 20c Perroudite; 25 Demicheleite-(Br), 25 Demicheleite-(Cl)
  - 02.FD With O, OH, H_{2}O: 05 Kermesite, 10 Viaeneite, 20 Erdite, 25 Coyoteite; 30 Haapalaite, 30 Valleriite, 30 Yushkinite; 35 Tochilinite, 40 Wilhelmramsayite, 45 Vyalsovite, 50 Bazhenovite
- 02.X Unclassified Strunz Sulfides
  - 02.XX Unknown: 00 Horsfordite?, 00 Imgreite?, 00 Bravoite?, 00 Isochalcopyrite?, 00 Bayankhanite?, 00 Dzhezkazganite*, 00 Matraite?, 00 Iridisite*, 00 Prassoite, 00 Samaniite, 00 Horomanite, 00 Jeromite?, 00 Dilithium*, 00 Kurilite?

== See also ==
- Classification of non-silicate minerals
- Classification of silicate minerals
