= Sulfarsenide mineral =

The sulfarsenide minerals are a subgroup of the sulfide minerals which include arsenic replacing sulfur as an anion in the formula. Antimony and bismuth may occur with or in place of the arsenic as in ullmannite. The chemical formula of a sulfarsenide looks like a sulfosalt, however the structures are distinctly different. In sulfosalts the arsenic replaces a metal ion.

The sulfarsenides are grouped with the sulfides in both the Dana and Strunz mineral classification systems.

Examples include:

- Arsenopyrite group:
  - Arsenopyrite FeAsS
  - Glaucodot (Co,Fe)AsS
  - Gudmundite FeSbS
  - Lautite CuAsS
  - Alloclasite (Co,Fe)AsS
- Cobaltite group
  - Cobaltite CoAsS
  - Gersdorffite NiAsS
  - Ullmannite (Ni,Cu,Fe)(Sb,As,Bi)S
