= Oregonite =

Mineral

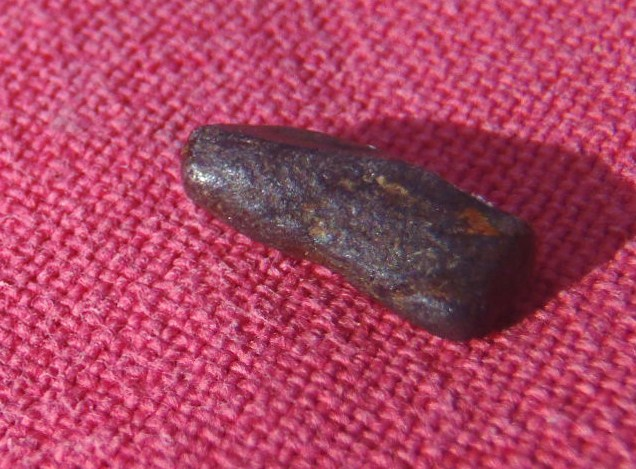
- Oregonite, awaruite (dimensions: 11 mm x 4 mm x 5 mm)

General
- Category: Sulfide minerals
- Formula: Ni_{2}FeAs_{2}
- IMA symbol: Ore
- Strunz classification: 2.BB.05
- Crystal system: Hexagonal; Unknown space group

Identification
- Color: white
- Mohs scale hardness: 5
- Luster: metallic

Oregonite, Ni_{2}FeAs_{2} is a nickel iron arsenide mineral first described from Josephine Creek, Oregon, United States.

Oregonite crystallises in the hexagonal crystal system and has a Mohs hardness of 5.

== Occurrence ==
Oregonite is known, apart from its type locality, from the Chirnaisky Massif, Russia, associated with hydrothermal nickel minerals (millerite, heazelwoodite) in a metamorphosed ultramafic; from the Skouriatissa mine, Cyprus, associated with VMS mineralisation; and from the Kidd Mine, Timmins, Ontario, Canada within serpentinite-hosted chromite deposits.
