= Jolliffeite =

Selenide mineral

General
- Category: Selenide mineral
- Formula: (Ni,Co)AsSe
- IMA symbol: Jlf
- Strunz classification: 2.EB.25
- Crystal system: Isometric
- Crystal class: Diploidal (m3̅); H-M symbol: (2m 3̅)
- Space group: Pa3̅
- Unit cell: a = 5.831 Å; Z = 4

Identification
- Color: Tin white
- Crystal habit: Anhedral grains
- Mohs scale hardness: 6-6.5
- Luster: Metallic
- Diaphaneity: Opaque
- Density: 7.1 (calculated)
- Optical properties: Isotropic

Jolliffeite is a rare selenide mineral with formula NiAsSe or (Ni,Co)AsSe. It is the selenium analogue of the sulfide mineral gersdorffite, NiAsS, with a common impurity of cobalt, CoAsSe. It is named for its discoverer, Alfred Jolliffe, (1907–1988), a Canadian geologist of Queen's University, Kingston, Ontario.

== Crystallography ==
Jolliffeite has cubic symmetry and is therefore isometric meaning crystallographically, it contains three perpendicular axes of equal lengths. It has four three-fold axes all inclined at the same angle to the crystallographic axes. Optically, Jolliffeite is isotropic. Isotropic minerals have a single refractive index and are not birefringent. The single refractive index of Jolliffeite can be determined by its relief.

== Discovery and Importance ==
Jollifeite was discovered in 1991 within a fracture zone near a contact of an intrusive peridotite with dolomite from the Fish Hook Bay area, Shirley Peninsula, north shore of Lake Athabaska, Saskatchewan, Canada, in a geological environment with high concentration of platinum group elements. The area of the Shirley Peninsula consists of rocks mainly Archean in age. The rare finding of Jolliffeite in this region is helping geologists piece together more of the area's history. Its composition of nickel and arsenic makes it important for mineral resources as the two have many common uses. Jollifeite's presence may also lead to the finding of other important minerals as it was found in the drill core with chalcopyrite, pyrite, hematite, arsenopyrite, bornite, calcite, dolomite, quartz, cofinite, pitchblende, native gold, native silver, cobaltite, and micas.
