= Wakabayashilite =

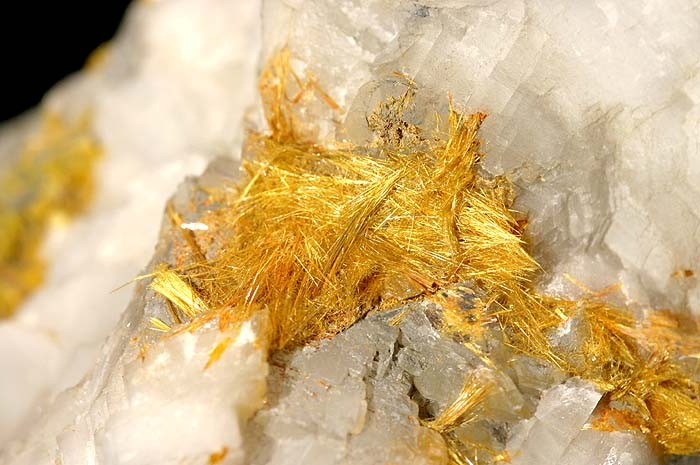
- Wakabayashilite on calcite

General
- Category: Arsenic sulfide, Sulfosalt mineral
- Formula: [(As,Sb)_{6}S_{9}][As_{4}S_{5}]
- IMA symbol: Wak
- Strunz classification: 2.FA.40
- Crystal system: Orthorhombic
- Crystal class: Pyramidal (mm2); H-M symbol: (mm2)
- Space group: Pna2_{1}
- Unit cell: a = 25.262 Å, b = 14.563 Å c = 6.492 Å and V = 2388.4 Å^{3}; Z = 4

Identification
- Formula mass: 1291.8 gram/mol
- Color: Golden yellow, lemon yellow, orange yellow
- Crystal habit: Fibrous
- Cleavage: {100} Perfect, {010} Perfect and {101} Perfect
- Mohs scale hardness: 1.5
- Luster: Silky
- Streak: Orange, yellow
- Diaphaneity: Translucent
- Specific gravity: 3.98
- Pleochroism: Strong

Wakabayashilite is a rare arsenic, antimony sulfide mineral with formula [(As,Sb)_{6}S_{9}][As_{4}S_{5}].

== Discovery and occurrence ==
Wakabayashilite is a rare mineral first discovered in Nevada in the 1920s, but it was mistaken for a hair orpiment. In the 1970s, wakabayashilite was found in Japan and scientifically identified as a new mineral. It was named after Yaichiro Wakabayashi (1874–1943), a Japanese mineralogist of the Mitsubishi Mining Company in Japan. Wakabayashilite has been discovered later in several places around the world such as in Saha Republic (Russia), Zhuang region (China) and Hautes-Alpes (France). In the United States, Wakabayashilite has been found at the White Caps Mine, in the Toquima Range of mountains, Nye County, Nevada. Other Nevada locations where the mineral has been found include the Getchel Mine, in the Osgood Mountains, Humboldt County, and at the Seminole-Regent Mine, in the Rawhide Mining District, Mineral County. Originally, Wakabayashilite was found in druses of quartz associated with orpiment and realgar, however, it was later found embedded in calcite as well. Generally, it mostly occurs with other arsenic minerals in high-arsenic gold deposits.

== Structure and optical properties ==
Even though Wakabayashilite possesses the hexagonal pseudosymmetry, it actually belongs to the orthorhombic crystal system meaning it contains three axes of different length but are mutually perpendicular to one another. It also belongs to the space group Pna2_{1}. For its optical properties, Wakabayashilite is a biaxial mineral and its color in plane polarized light is golden-yellow to lemon-yellow and it also has strong pleochroism.

For now, since wakabayashilite is rare, it is of no obvious economical interest. However, there have been some recent research conducted on its interesting structure, pseudosymmetry and twinning.
