= Arsenic sulfide =

Arsenic sulfide may refer to:

- Arsenic trisulfide, As_{2}S_{3}, the mineral orpiment
- Arsenic pentasulfide, As_{2}S_{5}, similar structure to phosphorus pentasulfide (β-P_{2}S_{5})
- Tetraarsenic tetrasulfide, As_{4}S_{4} (2 isomers):
  - the mineral realgar
  - the mineral pararealgar
- Tetraarsenic trisulfide, As_{4}S_{3}, the mineral α- or β- dimorphite
