= Fukuchilite =

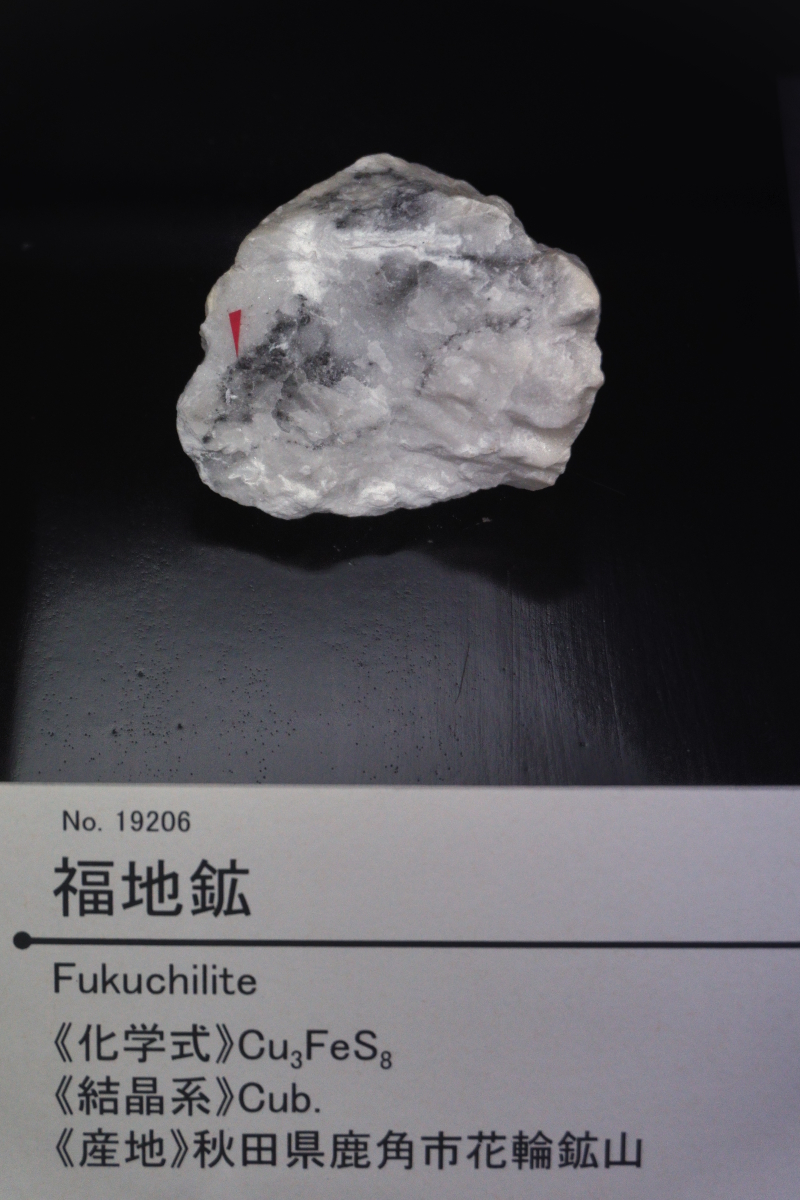
- Fukuchilite

General
- Category: Sulfide mineral
- Formula: Cu_{3}FeS_{8}
- IMA symbol: Fuk
- Strunz classification: 2.EB.05a
- Crystal system: Cubic
- Crystal class: Diploidal (m3̅); H-M symbol: (2/m 3̅)
- Space group: Pa3
- Unit cell: a = 5.58 Å: Z = 1

Identification
- Color: Dark brownish gray; pinkish brown in polished section
- Crystal habit: As intergrowths with pyrite and covellite, grains less than 1 μm
- Mohs scale hardness: 4 - 6
- Luster: Submetallic
- Diaphaneity: Opaque
- Specific gravity: 4.86
- Optical properties: Isotropic

Fukuchilite, Cu_{3}FeS_{8}, is a copper iron sulfide named after the Japanese mineralogist Nobuyo Fukuchi (1877–1934), that occurs in ore bodies of gypsum-anhydrite at the intersection points of small masses of barite, covellite, gypsum and pyrite, and is mostly found in the Hanawa mine in the Akita prefecture of Honshū, Japan where it was first discovered in 1969. It occurs in masses within the third geologic unit of the Kuroko type deposits within the mine.

As a copper, iron sulfide, it is placed in the same group as bornite and chalcopyrite, and most fukuchilite locations are found in relatively close proximity to these minerals. Fukuchilite was found to have a reflection color very similar to bornite and bright pinkish brown in air, while being a purplish brown in oil. Also, it was found to have a reactivity lower than pyrite, but distinctly higher than bornite. It has a Mohs hardness of 4–6, a specific gravity of 4.9, and a sub metallic luster, composed of 11.1% iron, 37.9% copper, and 51.00% of sulfur.

It is in the isotropic cubic crystal system with symmetry: (2/m3̅), space group P a3. Much relating to the structure of the mineral is still under debate, and some believe that fukuchilite might actually be a form of villamaninite (Cu,Ni,Co,Fe)S_{2}, but fukuchilite currently still holds its mineral status as there is currently not enough evidence to discredit an already accepted and titled mineral.
