= Gersdorffite =

Nickel arsenide-sulfide (NiAsS) mineral

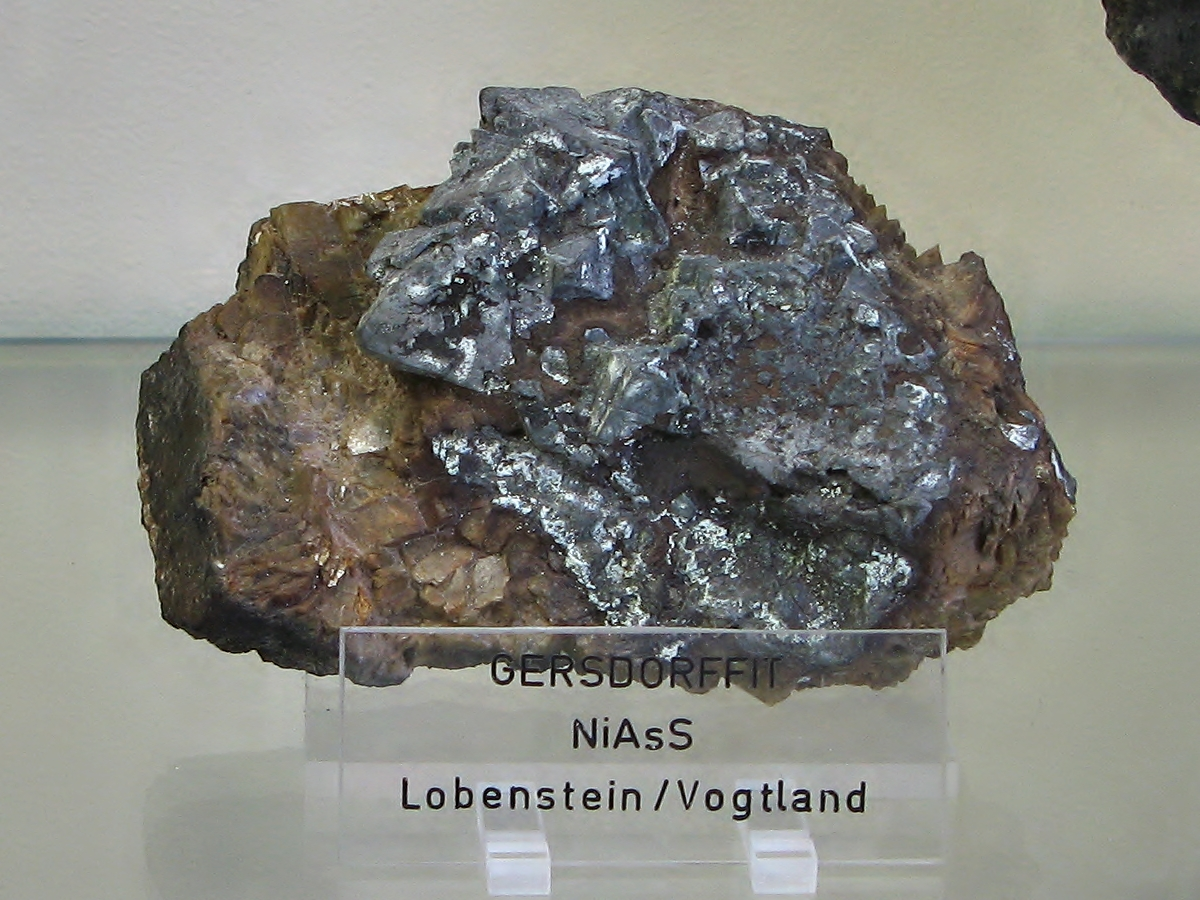
- Gersdorffite

General
- Category: Minerals
- Formula: NiAsS
- Strunz classification: 2.EB.25
- Crystal system: P2_{1}3 polytype: cubic Pa3 polytype: cubic Pca2_{1} polytype: orthorhombic

Identification
- Color: silver white to steel gray
- Mohs scale hardness: 5–5.5
- Streak: grayish black
- Specific gravity: 5.6–6.2

Gersdorffite or Nickel glance (trivial name) is a nickel arsenic sulfide mineral with formula NiAsS. It crystallizes in the isometric system showing diploidal symmetry. It occurs as euhedral to massive opaque, metallic grey-black to silver white forms. Gersdorffite belongs to a solid solution series with cobaltite, CoAsS. Antimony freely substitutes also leading to ullmannite, NiSbS. It has a Mohs hardness of 5.5 and a specific gravity of 5.9 to 6.33.

Gersdorffite has three crystallisation forms: Gersdorffite-P2_{1}3 (NiAsS), Gersdorffite-Pa3 (Ni(As,S)_{2}) and Gersdorffite-Pca2_{1} (NiAsS). Gersdorffite occurs as a hydrothermal vein mineral along with other nickel sulfides. Associated minerals include nickeline, nickel-skutterudite, cobaltite, ullmannite, maucherite, löllingite, platinum-group minerals, millerite, pyrite, marcasite, and chalcopyrite.

Gersdorffite was first described in 1843 and named in 1845 for Johann von Gersdorff (1781–1849), owner of the nickel mine at Schladming, Austria the type locality.
