= Rammelsbergite =

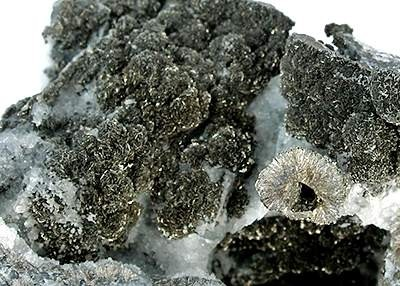

General
- Category: Minerals
- Formula: NiAs_{2}
- IMA symbol: Rmb
- Strunz classification: 2.EB.15a
- Crystal system: Orthorhombic
- Crystal class: Dipyramidal (mmm); H-M symbol: (2/m 2/m 2/m)
- Space group: Pnnm
- Unit cell: a = 4.759 Å, b = 5.797 Å c = 3.539 Å; Z = 2

Identification
- Color: Tin white with a faint pinkish hue
- Crystal habit: Rarely as prismatic crystals; commonly massive, granular, radial, fibrous
- Twinning: On {101}
- Cleavage: Distinct on {101}
- Fracture: Irregular
- Tenacity: Brittle
- Mohs scale hardness: 5.5–6
- Luster: Metallic
- Streak: Grayish black
- Diaphaneity: Opaque
- Specific gravity: 7.0–7.1
- Optical properties: Strongly anisotropic
- Pleochroism: Weak, yellow to pinkish hue and bluish white

Rammelsbergite is a nickel arsenide mineral with formula NiAs_{2}. It forms metallic silvery to tin white to reddish orthorhombic prismatic crystals, and is usually massive in form. It has a Mohs hardness of 5.5 and a specific gravity of 7.1.

It was first described in 1854 from its type locality in the Schneeberg District in Saxony, Germany. It was named after the German chemist and mineralogist, Karl Friedrich August Rammelsberg (1813–1899).

It occurs as a hydrothermal mineral in medium temperature veins association with skutterudite, safflorite, lollingite, nickeline, native bismuth, native silver, algodonite, domeykite and uraninite.

== See also ==
- List of minerals named after people
