= Rheniite =

Rare mineral

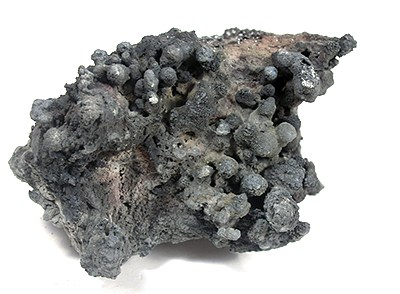
- Rheniite on basalt from the Kudriavy Volcano, Kurile Islands

General
- Category: Sulfide mineral
- Formula: ReS_{2}
- IMA symbol: Rhn
- Strunz classification: 2.EB.35
- Crystal system: Triclinic
- Crystal class: Pinacoidal (1̅) (same H-M symbol)
- Space group: P1̅
- Unit cell: a = 6.47 Å, b = 6.368 Å c = 6.401 Å; α = 105° β = 91.59°, γ = 118.9°; Z = 4

Identification
- Color: Black, red translucent
- Crystal habit: Platey
- Luster: Metallic
- Streak: Black
- Diaphaneity: Opaque, translucent in thin fragments

Rheniite is a very rare rhenium sulfide mineral with the chemical formula ReS_{2}. It forms metallic, silver-grey platey crystals in the triclinic–pinacoidal class. It has a specific gravity of 7.5.

It was discovered as pure mineral the Kudriavy Volcano, Iturup Island in the Kurile Islands, Russia in 2004. It is found in active hot fumaroles on the volcano.

Rheniite is one of the first minerals of the element rhenium to be found. The other known approved rhenium mineral is the sulfide mineral tarkianite. Almost all commercially-mined rhenium is retrieved as a by-product of molybdenum mining as rhenium occurs in amounts up to 0.2% in the mineral molybdenite. A discredited rhenium sulfide known as zappinite does not appear to be valid.

Rheniite has also been reported in the Pagoni Rachi Mo–Cu–Te–Ag–Au deposit in northeastern Greece, where it occurs with molybdenite in quartz veins associated with an epithermal system in a dacite porphyry.
