= Alacránite =

Multicolor Sulfide mineral

Alacranite
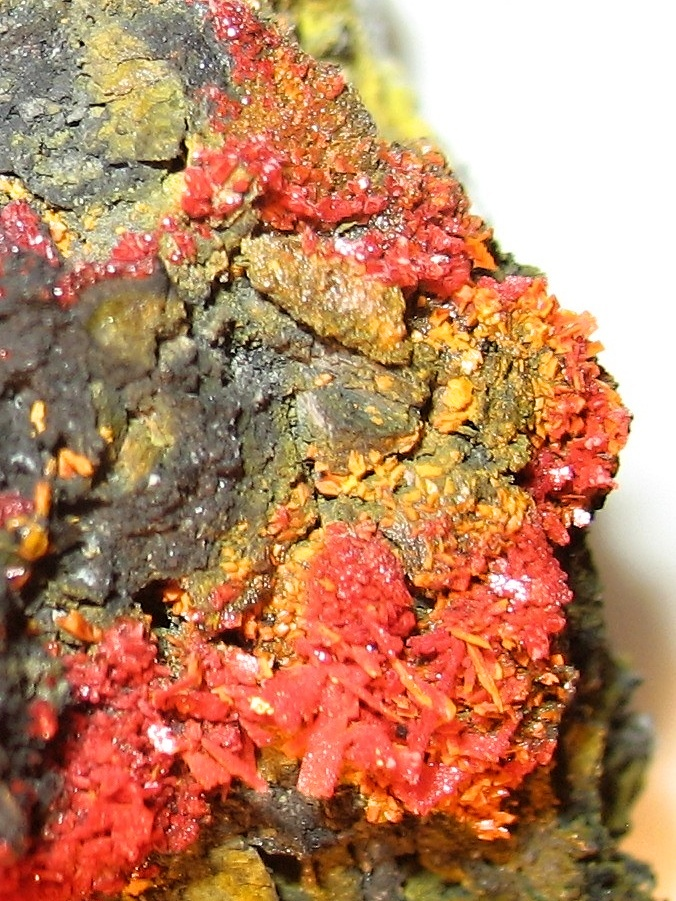
- Alacránite from former Kateřina Mine, Radvanice, Trutnov District, Czech Republic (1999)

General
- Category: Sulfide mineral
- Formula: As_{8}S_{9}
- IMA symbol: Acr
- Strunz classification: 2.FA.20
- Crystal system: Monoclinic
- Crystal class: Prismatic (2/m) (same H-M symbol)
- Space group: P2/c
- Unit cell: a = 9.942, b = 9.601 c = 9.178 [Å]; β = 101.94°; Z = 2

Identification
- Color: Orange to pale gray, rose-yellow internal reflections
- Crystal habit: Equant grains
- Cleavage: Imperfect on {100}
- Tenacity: Brittle
- Mohs scale hardness: 1.5
- Luster: Vitreous, resinous, greasy
- Streak: Yellow-orange
- Diaphaneity: Transparent to translucent
- Specific gravity: 3.4 - 3.46
- Optical properties: Biaxial (+)
- Refractive index: n_{α} = 2.390(1) n_{γ} = 2.520(2)
- Birefringence: 0.1300

Alacránite (As_{8}S_{9}) is an arsenic sulfide mineral first discovered in the Uzon caldera, Kamchatka, Russia. It was named for its occurrence in the Alacrán silver/arsenic/antimony mine. Pampa Larga, Chile. It is generally more rare than realgar and orpiment. Its origin is hydrothermal. It occurs as subhedral to euhedral tabular orange to pale gray crystals that are transparent to translucent. It has a yellow-orange streak with a hardness of 1.5. It crystallizes in the monoclinic crystal system. It occurs with realgar and uzonite as flattened and prismatic grains up to 0.5 mm across.

== Composition ==
When alacranite was first discovered in 1970 by Clark, it was associated with barite and calcite veins in the Alacran silver mine. They also assumed that the mineral was identical to the species occurring in the Ag-As-Sb vein deposit at Alacran due to the similarity of its X-ray diffraction powder pattern. They discovered that alacranite was similar to the high-temperature α polymorph of As_{4}S_{4} in X-ray characteristics. In addition, alacranite was considered as realgar-like mineral. After that, they reported the composition of alacranite as As_{8}S_{9} when they noticed another occurrence of Alacranite in Uzon Caldera associated with realgar and uzonite as cement in sandy gravels. They reported the composition of alacranite to be As_{8}S_{9} regarding to the electron-microprobe analyses. When they analyzed a mineral during seafloor sampling consisting of red and orange arsenic sulfides by X-ray diffraction, a mixture of realgar and alacranite was resulted and it was noticed that the mineral was identical to synthetic β-As_{4}S_{4} supposed that the original chemical formula of alacranite (As_{8}S_{9}) was incorrect. They argued that it is identical to alacranite because of the similarity of the physical properties and the unit-cell dimensions but further studies argue that it is different with respect to chemical formula and unit-cell volume. The chemistry of the average of four analyses in Uzon caldera, Russia corresponding to alacranite results in 67.35% arsenic and 32.61% sulfur resulting in a total of 99.96%, yielding the formula As_{7.98}S_{9.02}, ideally As_{8}S_{9}.

== Structure ==
=== X-ray crystallography ===
The structure of alacranite remained unsolved until further studies collected specimens containing crystals of alacranite. A group that studies seafloor hydrothermal, submarine volcanism and regional tectonics in Papua New Guinea collected samples that consists of clay minerals, pyrite, sphalerite, galena, chalcopyrite, sulfosalts and arsenic-bearing sulfides like realgar and alacranite. Data were gathered at different times using monochromatic X-radiation when a crystal of alacranite with approximate dimensions 0.14 × 0.10 × 0.06 mm was placed in a platform 3-circle goniometer equipped with a 1K charge-coupled device for 2θ up to 56.7°. The data shows reflection statistics and systematic absences that indicates space group C2/c referring to the monoclinic symmetry for alacranite. Final results of the experiment show that alacranite is isostructural with the compound α-As_{4}S_{4} and it is the third mineral polymorph with the formula As_{4}S_{4}, the others are realgar and pararealgar. The three minerals consist of covalently bonded As_{4}S_{4} molecules. In alacranite, each arsenic atom is bonded to one arsenic atom and two sulfur atoms, while the sulfur atoms bonded only to two arsenic atoms. The structure of molecules in alacranite is chemically the same as in realgar held together by van der Waals forces but different in the arrangement of the As_{4}S_{4} in both structures. The differences between alacranite and realgar are demonstrated in the unit cell sizes and the packed structures of both minerals. Alacranite has a C-centered unit cell that is smaller than the primitive cell of realgar and also the structure of alacranite has a closely and more orderly packed structure than realgar.

=== Fourier analysis ===
Further studies of a single crystal of alacranite with dimensions 30 × 60 × 120 mm was examined using direct methods, Fourier syntheses and structure refinement resulting in intensities violating the C lattice type and symmetries like h0l reflections with l = 2n + 1 were absent. These results confirm the P2/c space group of alacranite resulting in a structure of two different kinds of cage-like molecules that are packing closely and found in the β-phase. The first molecule is identical to the As_{4}S_{4} which is realgar where every As atom links one As and two S atoms and that is determined in the structure of the β-phase and realgar. The second molecule in the structure of alacranite is found to be chemically and structurally identical to As_{4}S_{5} which is uzonite. Upon exposure to light, As_{4}S_{4} molecule expands its unit cell volume and hence, transfers to As_{4}S_{5}. This transformation could be described to the variation of the inter molecular distances. These coherent orders of both molecules along [110] attributes to the change of the translation symmetry from C (β-phase) to P which is alacranite. In both molecules, the distances of the As-S bond are about 2.205 to 2.238 angstrom. However, the As-As bond distance in the As_{4}S_{4} is longer than the As-As bond contained in As_{4}S_{5} molecule within alacranite structure. It was also shown that the unit-cell volume increases proportionally with increasing S content of minerals with ranging composition from As_{4}S_{4} to As_{8}S_{9} where alacranite has the biggest unit-cell in this range. Evidence supports that alacranite has a P2/c space group whereas the high-temperature and less content of S form is considered to be a new mineral that corresponds to the species from alacran previously described by which is As_{4}S_{4} that crystallizes with the space group C2/c and has a smaller volume.

== Physical properties ==
Alacranite occurs as cement in sandy gravel and in hydrothermal As-S veins. It occurs with a grain size up to 0.5 mm as flattened and prismatic crystals. Some forms are weak, dull or tarnished. It appears an orange to pale gray crystals with rose-yellow internal reflections with a yellow-orange streak. It has adamantine, vitreous, resinous and greasy luster and it is transparent. The weak chemical bonding in its structure gives the mineral a low Mohs hardness of around 1.5 and weak forms. It has an imperfect cleavage and its fracture is conchoidal and very brittle. Its specific gravity is measured to be around 3.43. When it reacts with 5 molar potassium hydroxide, alacranite changes color to brown. It changes into brown-gray flakes when it is heated, and boiling it should return its color to brown. However, if it is mixed with hydrochloric acid or nitric acid, it does not show any activity.

== Geologic occurrence ==
Alacranite was first found in the Uzon Caldera, Russia. The Uzon caldera is located near the eastern volcanic belt of the Kamchatka peninsula. The area is a basaltic shield volcano with lacustrine sediments, faulting and extension, dome formation and hydrothermal fluids from hot springs within the caldera. Amounts of realgar, stibnite, cinnabar and pyrite are contained in sediments near active hot springs.

Alacranite occurs in the condensation zone of a hydrothermal Hg-Sb-As system in the Uzon caldera. Alacranite could also be found in hydrothermal As-S veins.

It was named alacranite after its occurrence in the Alacran mine in Chile due to its similarities in X-ray diffraction patterns of the samples from the Uzon caldera to those in the Alacan mine.
