= Valleriite =

Uncommon sulfide-hydroxide mineral of iron and copper

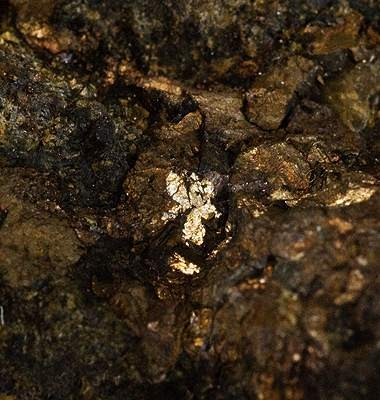
- Cubanite (brass yellow), maucherite (dark gray) and valleriite (dark bronze), mainly

General
- Category: Sulfide mineral
- Formula: (Fe^{2+},Cu)_{4}(Mg,Al)_{3}S_{4}(OH,O)_{6}
- Strunz classification: 2.FD.30
- Dana classification: 2.14.1.1
- Crystal system: Trigonal
- Crystal class: Hexagonal scalenohedral (3̅m); H-M symbol: (3̅ 2/m)
- Space group: R3̅m
- Unit cell: a = 3.79, c = 34.1 [Å]; Z = 2

Identification
- Color: Bronze-yellow, gray
- Crystal habit: Massive, nodular, encrustations, thin splintery
- Cleavage: Excellent on {0001}
- Mohs scale hardness: 1–1.5
- Luster: Metallic
- Streak: Black
- Diaphaneity: Opaque
- Specific gravity: 3.14 (measured)
- Pleochroism: Strong; pale yellow to deep brown

Valleriite is an uncommon sulfide mineral (hydroxysulfide) of iron and copper with formula: 4(Fe,Cu)S·3(Mg,Al)(OH)_{2} or (Fe^{2+},Cu)_{4}(Mg,Al)_{3}S_{4}(OH,O)_{6}. It is an opaque, soft, bronze-yellow to brown mineral which occurs as nodules or encrustations.

== Discovery and occurrence ==
Valleriite was first described in 1870 from an occurrence in Västmanland, Sweden. It was named for Swedish chemist Johan Gottschalk Wallerius (Vallerius) (1709–1785).

Valleriite occurs in dunites and chromitites replacing chalcopyrite in Cyprus. In Phalaborwa, South Africa it occurs as replacement of magnetite in a carbonatite. It occurs as replacements of copper and nickel phases in serpentinites and other altered ultramafic rocks.
