= Lautite =

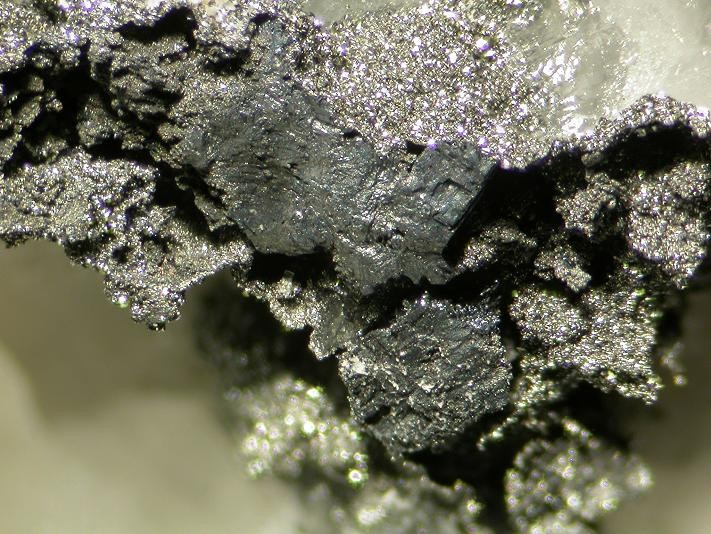
- Dark grey metallic lautite together with white metallic löllingite

General
- Category: Sulfide minerals
- Formula: CuAsS
- IMA symbol: Ltt
- Strunz classification: 2.CB.40
- Crystal system: Orthorhombic
- Crystal class: Pyramidal (mm2) (same H-M symbol)
- Space group: Pna2_{1}

Identification

Lautite is a rare mineral belonging to the class of sulfides and sulfosalts with the general formula CuAsS. It is orthorhombic and is known to form up to 2.3 cm long prismatic or flat crystals. It is also found as grains or masses.

First identified by Friedrich August Frenzel in 1880 in the Rudolphschacht mine near Lauta in Saxony, it was named after its type locality.

Lautite is formed in veins under hydrothermal conditions at medium temperatures. Depending on the locality it is found accompanied by arsenic, tennantite, proustite, chalcopyrite, galenite, and baryte (in the type locality); by kutinaite and paxite (in Nieder-Beerbach); or by arsenic, bismuth, tennantite, loellingite, rammelsbergite, proustite, and quartz (in Sainte-Marie-aux-Mines).

Aside from the type locality, the mineral is found in other places in the Ore Mountains, in Sankt Andreasberg in the Harz mountains, Nieder-Beerbach in the Odenwald, Hausach, Schenkenzell, and Titisee-Neustadt in the Black Forest, Flatschach in Austria, Isérables in Switzerland, Cochrane in Canada, Luqu and Zoigê in China, Sirohi in India, Takab in Iran, Kombat in Namibia and Coconino County in Arizona, US.
