= Argentopyrite =

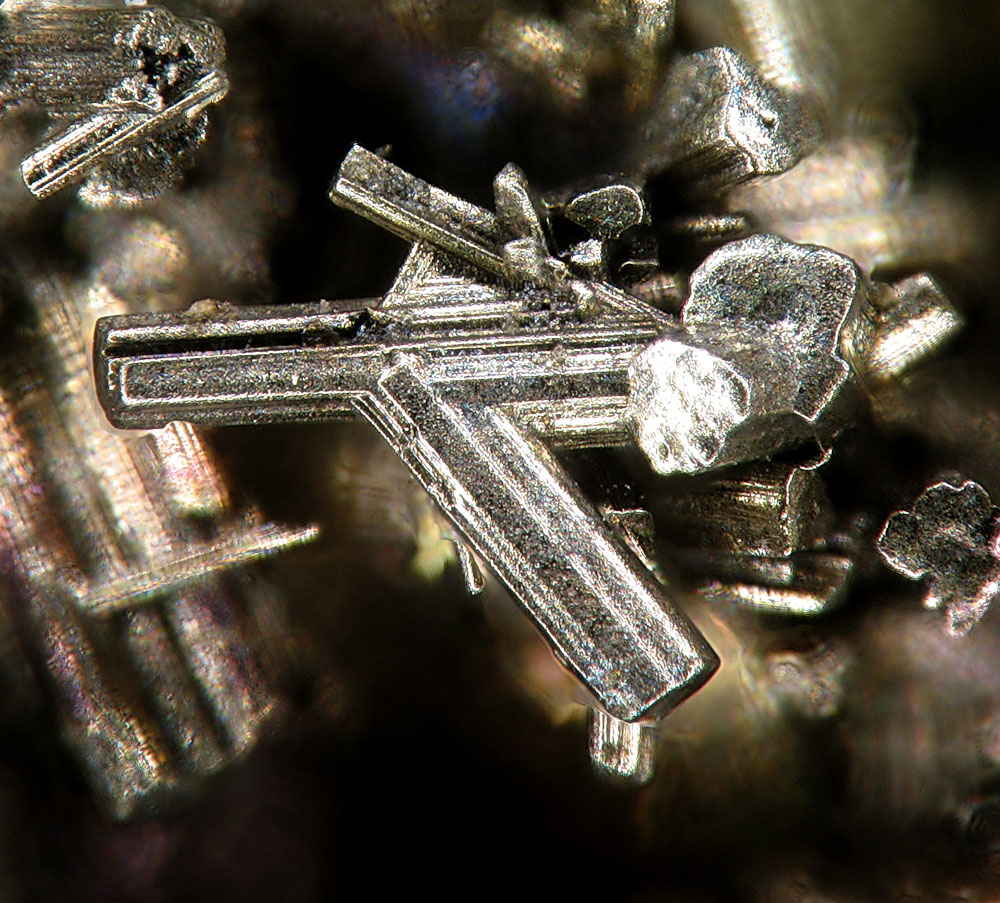
- Argentopyrite (from Schneeberg, Erzgebirge, Saxony, Germany)

General
- Category: Sulfide mineral
- Formula: AgFe_{2}S_{3}
- IMA symbol: Agpy
- Strunz classification: 2.CB.65
- Crystal system: Monoclinic
- Crystal class: Prismatic (2/m) (same H-M symbol)
- Space group: P112_{1}/n

Identification
- Color: Bronze-brown or gray-white; iridescent (many colors)
- Crystal habit: Tabular prisms, pseudohexagonal or pseudo-orthorhombic, possibly pyramidally-terminated
- Fracture: Uneven
- Tenacity: Brittle
- Mohs scale hardness: 3.5-4
- Luster: Metallic
- Streak: Grey
- Diaphaneity: Opaque
- Density: 4.25-4.27

Argentopyrite is a moderately rare sulfide mineral with the chemical formula AgFe_{2}S_{3}. It is one of the natural compounds of the MFe_{2}S_{3} type, with M being caesium in very rare pautovite, copper in relatively common cubanite, potassium in rare rasvumite and thallium in rare picotpaulite. The type locality is Jáchymov in Czech Republic. Chemically similar mineral include sternbergite (dimorphous with argentopyrite), lenaite, AgFeS_{2}, and argentopentlandite, Ag(Fe,Ni)_{8}S_{8}.

== Crystal structure ==
Although previously assumed orthorhombic, argentopyrite was later shown to be monoclinic, with structural relationship to cubanite. The most important feature of the argentopyrite structure are:

- hexagonal close-packing of sulfur atoms
- presence of AgS_{4} and FeS_{4} tetrahedra in sheets displaying corner-sharing
- presence of a cluster of four FeS_{4} tetrahedra that share edges
- presence of two iron sites, instead of one as in related species
- ordered-disordered ferrous-ferric nature of the mineral
