= Rhodplumsite =

Rhodium-lead mineral compound

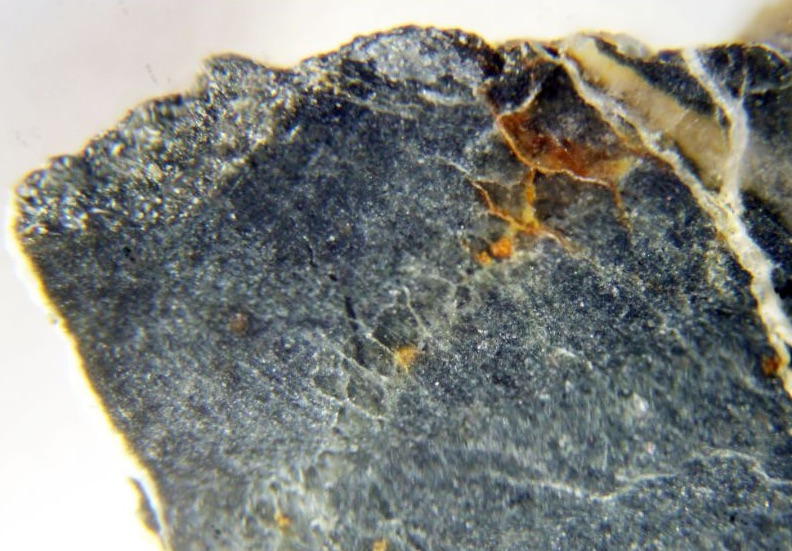

General
- Category: Sulfide mineral
- Formula: Rh_{3}Pb_{2}S_{2}
- Strunz classification: 2.BE.15
- Dana classification: 2.3.5.2
- Crystal system: Trigonal

Identification
- Color: Gray
- Luster: Metallic
- Diaphaneity: Opaque

Rhodplumsite is a rare rhodium-lead sulfide mineral, chemical formula Rh_{3}Pb_{2}S_{2}. It was originally discovered within a platinum nugget, in grains up to 40 μm in size. Its name originates from its composition; rhodium and lead (plumbum in Latin). Although this mineral contains large amounts of rhodium, it is not an economically viable ore of rhodium due to its rarity.
