= Xingzhongite =

General
- Category: Sulfide minerals
- Formula: (Pb,Cu,Fe)(Ir,Pt,Rh)_{2}S_{4}
- IMA symbol: Xin
- Strunz classification: 2.DA.05
- Crystal system: Isometric
- Crystal class: Hexoctahedral (m3̅m); H-M symbol: (4/m 3̅ 2/m)
- Space group: Fd3̅m

Identification
- Formula mass: 645.53 g/mol
- Color: Steel gray
- Mohs scale hardness: 6
- Luster: Metallic
- Diaphaneity: Opaque
- Specific gravity: 6.49

Xingzhongite is an opaque, metallic mineral named for its location of discovery in China.
