= Stillwaterite =

General
- Category: Arsenide mineral
- Formula: Pd_{8}As_{3}
- IMA symbol: Slw
- Strunz classification: 2.AC.10a
- Crystal system: Trigonal
- Crystal class: Pyramidal (3) or rhombohedral (3̅); H-M symbol: (3 or 3̅)
- Space group: P3 or P3̅
- Unit cell: a = 7.399(4) c = 10.311(15) [Å] V = 491.58 Å^{3}

Identification
- Formula mass: 1076.12 g/mol
- Color: light creamy gray
- Crystal habit: microscopic crystals
- Mohs scale hardness: 4.5
- Luster: metallic
- Diaphaneity: opaque
- Density: 10.96 g/cm^{3}
- Optical properties: weakly anisotropic in air; distinctly anisotropic in oil; no bireflectance; uniaxial
- Pleochroism: no
- Other characteristics: non-radioactive

Stillwaterite is a palladium arsenide mineral which has a general formula of Pd_{8}As_{3}. Stillwaterite was first discovered in the Banded and Upper zones of the Stillwater igneous complex in Montana, United States, and has been reported in the Lac-des-Iles area of Ontario, Canada. Outside of North America, this rare mineral has been found in northern Finland.

== Symmetry ==
Stillwaterite has hexagonal symmetry, meaning that it has four crystallographic axes: three are horizontal axes of equal length, and the fourth is a vertical axis of different length.

== Optical properties ==
Because it is opaque, stillwaterite is most commonly viewed under reflected light, appearing light creamy gray in color. It is weakly anisotropic in air, displaying dark gray to brownish gray color. In oil immersion, it shows distinct anisotropy with brownish black color and a blue to yellow-brown tinge. Hexagonal minerals such as stillwaterite are referred to as uniaxial crystals because they have only one direction, along the optic axis, in which light is not reoriented.

== Significance ==
Since its discovery in the mid-1970s, Stillwaterite has been studied to better understand the characteristics of complex mineral assemblages of gold, silicates, and other palladium arsenides with which it is associated. Minerals containing palladium can have economic significance, and are mined for use in industrial and commercial applications.
