= Oenite =

General
- Category: Sulfide minerals
- Group: Löllingite Group
- Formula: CoSbAs
- IMA symbol: Oen
- IMA status: Approved
- Strunz classification: 2.EB.10f
- Crystal system: Orthorhombic

Identification
- Color: Silver white
- Cleavage: None Observed
- Fracture: Irregular/Uneven
- Tenacity: Brittle
- Mohs scale hardness: 5 - 5.5
- Luster: Metallic
- Streak: Grey
- Specific gravity: 7.91 (Calculated)
- Density: 7.91 g/cm3 (Calculated)

Oenite is a mineral discovered in the Tunaberg Cu-Co-sulfide skarns, Bergslagen, Sweden, with the formula CoSbAs.
