= Allargentum =

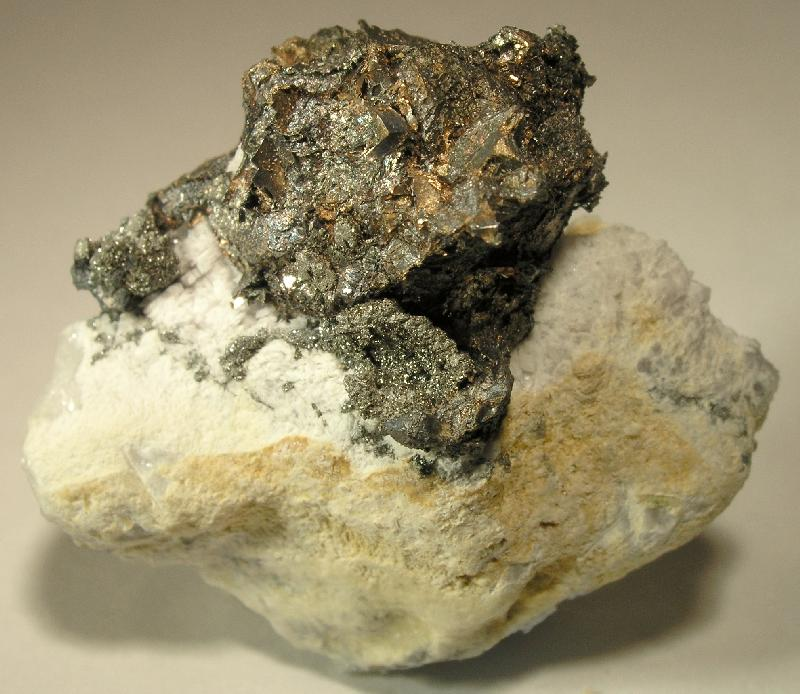
- Allargentum on carbonate; size 3.2×2.7×1.4 cm

General
- Category: Sulfide mineral
- Formula: Ag_{1−x}Sb_{x}
- IMA symbol: All
- Strunz classification: 2.AA.30
- Dana classification: 02.02.01.02
- Crystal system: Hexagonal
- Crystal class: Dihexagonal dipyramidal (6/mmm); H-M symbol: (6/m 2/m 2/m)
- Space group: P6_{3}/mmc
- Unit cell: a = 2.945, c = 4.77 [Å], Z = 2

Identification
- Color: Silver gray
- Mohs scale hardness: 4
- Luster: Metallic
- Diaphaneity: Opaque
- Specific gravity: 10.0 (meas.), 10.12 (calc.)

Allargentum is a mineral from the class of antimonides, superclass of sulfides and sulfosalts (sometimes ascribed to the natural elements and alloys class), with formula written as Ag_{1−x}Sb_{x}, where x = 0.09–0.16. This moderately rare mineral is found in silver ores and is therefore named from the Greek ἄλλος (allos, "another") and the Latin argentum ("silver"). Its Vickers hardness is 172–203.
