= Medvezhya =

Mountain in Russia

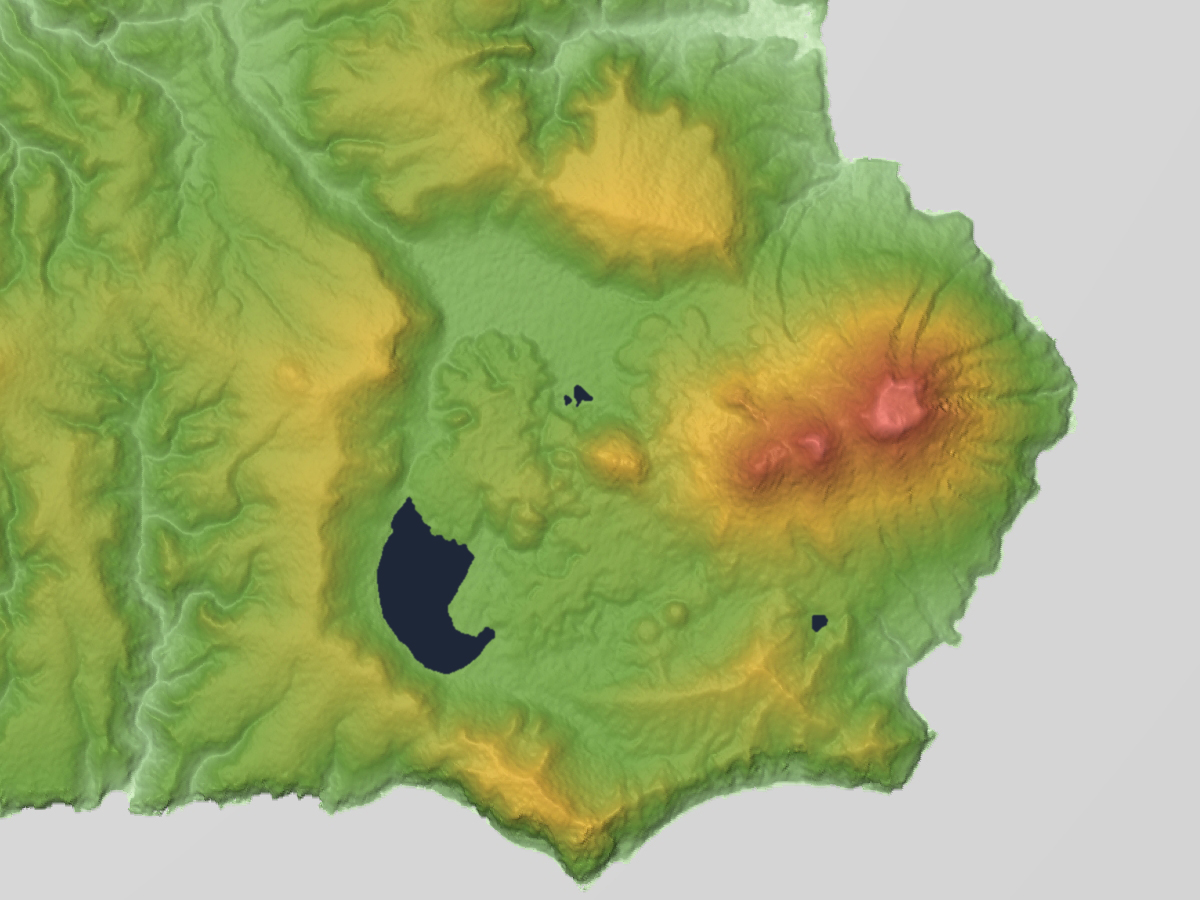

Highest point
- Elevation: 1,124 m (3,688 ft)
- Coordinates: 45.387°N 148.843°E

Geography
- Location within Far Eastern Federal District
- Location: Iturup, Kuril Islands, Russia

Geology
- Mountain type: Somma volcano
- Last eruption: October 1999

Medvezhya (Russian: Медве́жий вулкан; Japanese: 茂世路岳, Moyoro-dake) is a volcanic complex located at the northern end of Iturup Island, Kuril Islands, Russia. Rheniite, a rhenium sulfide mineral (ReS_{2}), was discovered within the active hot fumaroles of the volcano in 1994

== See also ==
- Fumarole mineral
- List of volcanoes in Russia
