= Cubanite =

Copper iron sulfide mineral

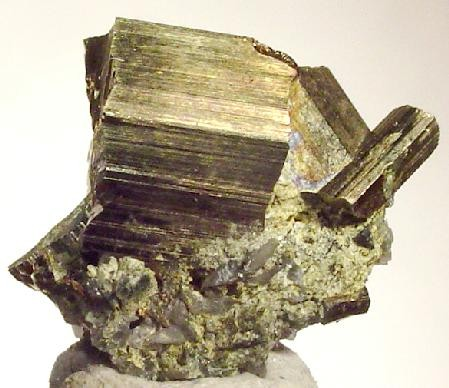
- Striated, cyclically-twinned cubanite crystals from the Chibougamau mines of Quebec (size: 1.5 × 1.3 × 1.0 cm)

General
- Category: Sulfide mineral
- Formula: CuFe_{2}S_{3}
- IMA symbol: Cbn
- Strunz classification: 2.CB.55a
- Crystal system: Orthorhombic
- Crystal class: Dipyramidal (mmm); H-M symbol: (2/m 2/m 2/m)
- Space group: Pcmn
- Unit cell: a = 6.467(1) Å, b = 11.117(1) Å, c = 6.231(2) Å; Z = 4

Identification
- Color: Bronze to brass-yellow
- Crystal habit: Crystals elongated to thick tabular, striated also massive
- Twinning: Common with twin plane {110} in pairs, also as fourlings and pseudohexagonal sixlings
- Cleavage: Parting on {110} and {13̅0}
- Fracture: Conchoidal
- Mohs scale hardness: 3.5–4
- Luster: Metallic
- Streak: Black
- Diaphaneity: Opaque
- Specific gravity: 4.0–4.2
- Optical properties: Distinctly anisotropic on polished surface
- Other characteristics: Strongly magnetic

Cubanite is a copper iron sulfide mineral that commonly occurs as a minor alteration mineral in magmatic sulfide deposits. It has the chemical formula CuFe_{2}S_{3} and when found, it has a bronze to brass-yellow appearance. On the Mohs hardness scale, cubanite falls between 3.5 and 4 and has a orthorhombic crystal system. Cubanite is chemically similar to chalcopyrite; however, it is the less common copper iron sulfide mineral due to crystallization requirements.

Cubanite occurs in high temperature hydrothermal mineral deposits with pyrrhotite and pentlandite as intergrowths with chalcopyrite. It results from exsolution from chalcopyrite at temperatures below 200 to 210 °C. If cubanite is exposed to temperatures above 210 °C, it will transform into isocubanite. After this transformation, if it begins to cool, it will not revert to cubanite. Upon its transformation to isocubanite it will lose its highly magnetic property due to its change from an orthorhombic to a cubic crystal structure. Cubanite has been identified on chondrites and within dust grain samples and has improved the precision of copper isotope analysis.

== Etymology and history ==
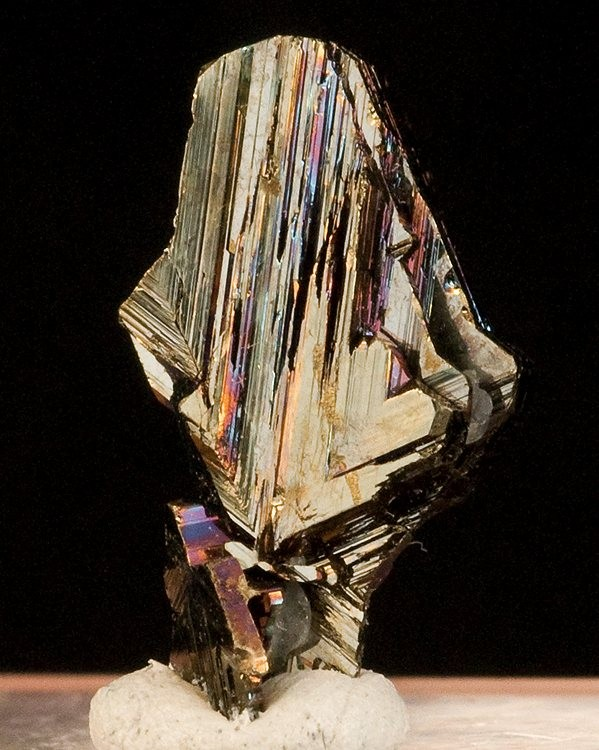
Iridescent and highly lustrous brass-yellow cubanite crystal from Chibougamau, Quebec (size: 1.7 x 1.0 x 0.7 cm)

Cubanite comes from the Spanish word Cubano, or Cuban in English, and the suffix -ite, when naming a mineral. Cubanite was first described in 1843 for its occurrence in the Mayarí-Baracoa Belt, HolguÍn Province, Cuba. It may also be referenced as barracanite in some literature.

== Association and alteration ==
As a minor alteration mineral, cubanite can only form when there is hydrothermal alteration of magmatic ores. The ores that are associated with cubanite are unaltered pyrrhotite-pentlandite-chalcopyrite ores that experience alteration to millerite-pyrite-chalcopyrite-cubanite ores, like those seen in the Bushveld Complex. For cubanite to form from chalcopyrite, a loss of copper relative to sulfur and iron and an increase in iron relative to sulfur must occur. This significant change in mineralogy results crystal structure change from tetragonal chalcopyrite to orthorhombic cubanite. With an increase in temperature above 210 °C, alteration continues and cubanite will transform into isocubanite, an isometric polymorph. There will be no transformation back to cubanite upon the cooling of the isocubanite.

== Extraterrestrial cubanite ==
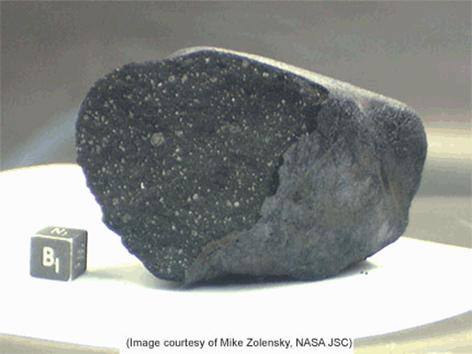
Tagish Lake Meteorite, Classified as CI-2 due to presence of chondrules

Although cubanite forms in hydrothermal mineral deposits, there are occurrences of cubanite that did not form on earth. Cubanite has been found in carbonaceous chondrite meteorites, specifically class CI-chondrites, as well as in cometary samples from NASA's Stardust spacecraft. Data from the Itokawa asteroid, collected by the Hayabusa spacecraft, indicated that a 2-micrometre grain of cubanite was found on the S-type asteroid. This is the first time cubanite has been found on another asteroid that was not class C-type. However, further inspection of the sample revealed that the cubanite likely formed exogeneous to the Itokawa body.

=== Synthetic cubanite ===
Although synthetic and chondritic cubanite have structural variations, synthesis of cubanite still grants insight into the formation of CI-chondrites. Using a lab-based variant of hydrothermal recrystallization, temperatures between 150 and 200 °C, and a pH of 9, scientists were able to determine compositions needed to replicate CI-chondrite mineralogy. Experiments that began with copper + iron + sulfur, covellite + troilite, and copper + sulfur + troilite all formed cubanite. Starting with troilite instead of iron metal reinforces previous studies that sulfides on Cl-chondrites are the resultant of oxidation of troilite by hydrothermal processes.

== Copper isotope analysis ==
Due to its complex growth nature, Cubanite has been the test subject for instrumental preference in copper isotope microanalysis. It was found that ultra violet laser ablation multiple collector inductively coupled plasma mass spectrometry (UV-fs-LA-MC-ICP-MS) improves precision in respect to copper isotopes, when compared to the use of near infrared (NIR-fs-LA-MC-ICP-MS) methods.

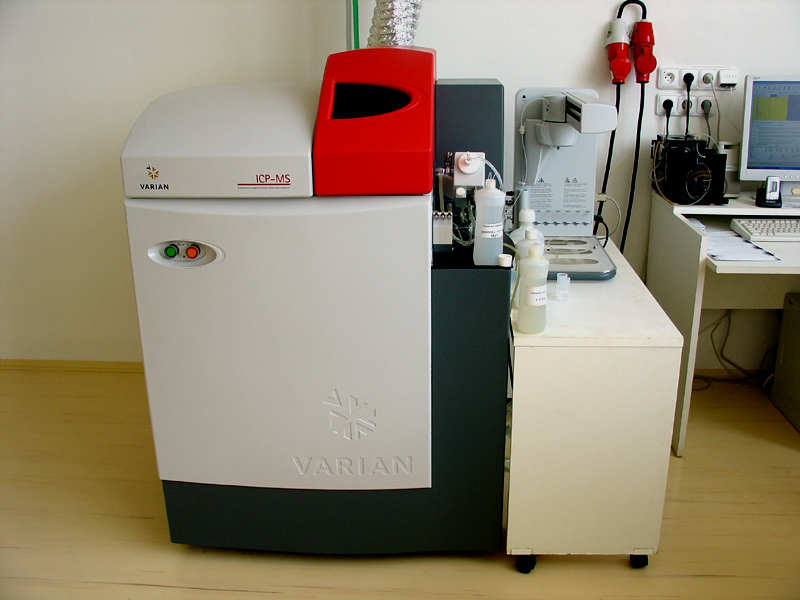
Inductively Coupled Plasma Mass Spectrometry (ICP-MS) analytical instrument
