= Tarkianite =

General
- Category: Sulfide mineral
- Formula: (Cu,Fe)(Re,Mo)_{4}S_{8}
- Strunz classification: 2.DB.30
- Crystal system: Isometric

Identification
- Color: Black
- Luster: Metallic
- Streak: Black
- Diaphaneity: Opaque

Tarkianite is a rhenium sulfide mineral. Its type locality is the Hitura Nickel Mine in Nivala, Finland. It was formally described in 2004 as an ideal formula (Cu, Fe)(Re, Mo)_{4}S_{8}
