= Dimorphite =

Arsenic-sulfide mineral

General
- Category: Sulfide mineral
- Formula: As_{4}S_{3}
- IMA symbol: Dim
- Strunz classification: 2.FA.10
- Crystal system: Orthorhombic
- Crystal class: Dipyramidal (mmm); H-M symbol: (2/m 2/m 2/m)
- Space group: Pnma
- Unit cell: a = 11.24, b = 9.90 c = 6.56 [Å]; Z = 4

Identification
- Formula mass: 395.88 g/mol
- Color: orange-yellow
- Crystal habit: Groups of pyramidal crystals
- Cleavage: none
- Fracture: brittle
- Mohs scale hardness: 1.5
- Luster: adamantine
- Streak: yellow
- Diaphaneity: transparent
- Specific gravity: 3.59
- Optical properties: Biaxial (+)
- Dispersion: strong
- Ultraviolet fluorescence: none
- Other characteristics: burns without residue

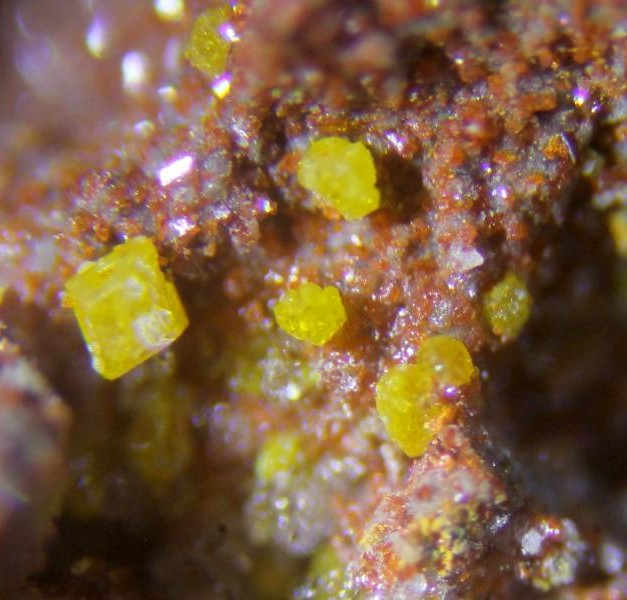
Yellow crystals of dimorphite from Campania, Italy

Dimorphite, chemical name arsenic sesquisulfide (As_{4}S_{3}), is a very rare orange-yellow arsenic sulfide mineral. In nature, dimorphite forms primarily by deposition in volcanic fumaroles at temperatures of 70–80 °C (158–176 °F). Dimorphite was first discovered in such a fumarole near Naples, Italy in 1849 by the mineralogist Arcangelo Scacchi (1810–1893). Since its discovery, dimorphite has been found in the Alacrán silver mine near Copiapó, Chile. It has also been reported from Cerro de Pasco, Peru, and the Lavrion District Mines in Attica, Greece.

== Properties and applications ==
Dimorphite has two crystal forms, Α- and Β-. This property gives rise to its name, which comes from the Greek for "two" and "form." Dimorphite transitions between its α- and β- forms at around 130 °C (266 °F).

Dimorphite can be synthesized by melting arsenic and sulfur together in the proper molar ratios in vacuum.

Initial research indicates the possibility of using synthetic dimorphite in the development of gas sensors, due to the semiconductive properties of dimorphite.
