= Domeykite =

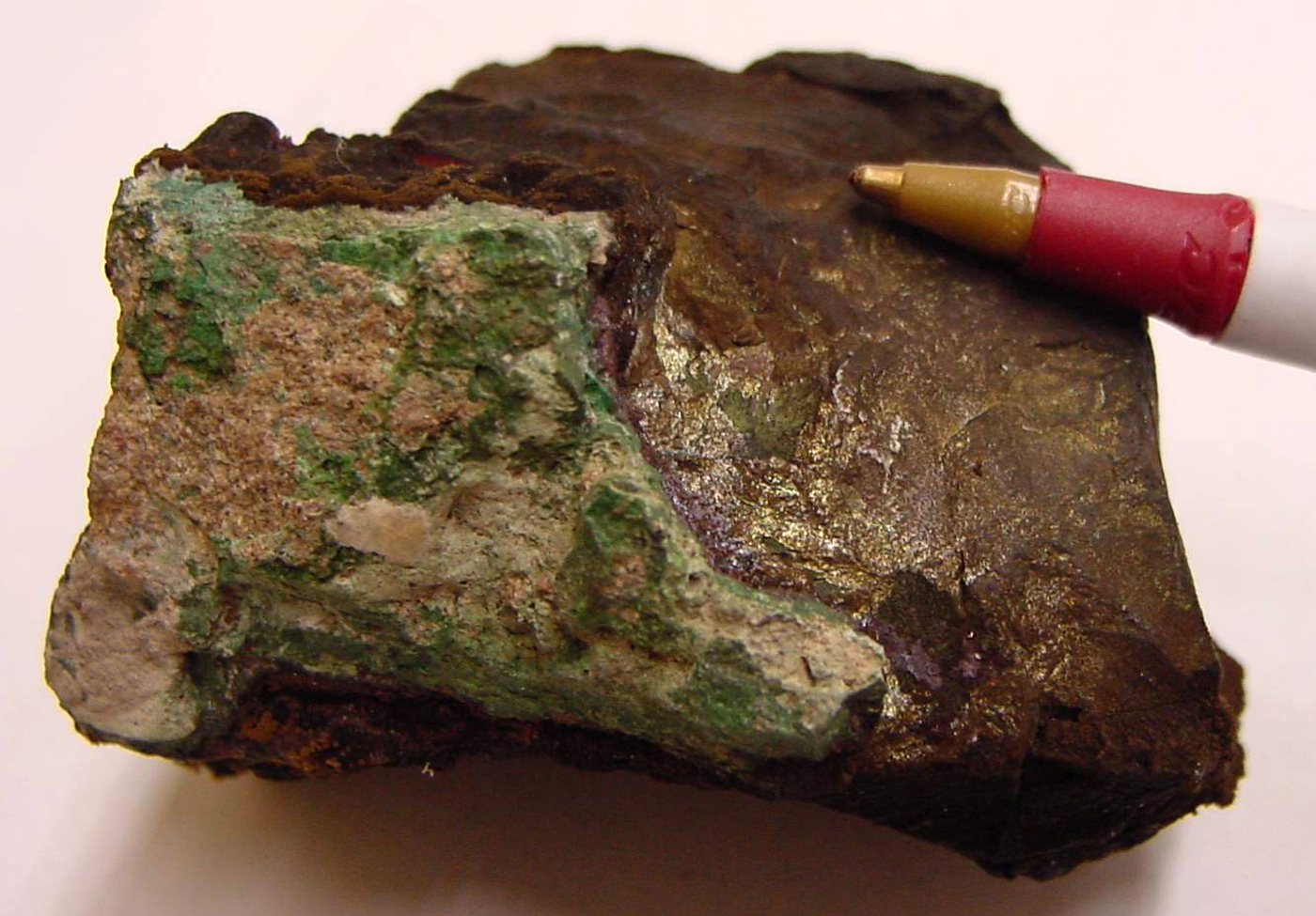

General
- Category: Arsenide mineral
- Formula: Cu_{3}As
- IMA symbol: Do
- Strunz classification: 2.AA.10b
- Crystal system: Isometric
- Crystal class: Hextetrahedral (4̅3m); H-M symbol: (4̅ 3m)
- Space group: I4̅3d
- Unit cell: a = 9.62 Å; Z = 16

Identification
- Formula mass: 265.56 g/mol
- Color: Tin-white to steel-gray
- Crystal habit: Reniform, botryoidal; massive
- Cleavage: None
- Tenacity: Brittle – sectile
- Mohs scale hardness: 3-3.5
- Luster: Metallic
- Streak: Black gray
- Diaphaneity: Opaque
- Specific gravity: 7.2 – 8.1, average = 7.65
- Other characteristics: Tarnishes pale yellow, then pale brown, and finally to iridescence

Domeykite is a copper arsenide mineral, Cu_{3}As. It crystallizes in the isometric system, although crystals are very rare. It typically forms as irregular masses or botryoidal forms. It is an opaque, white to gray (weathers brassy) metallic mineral with a Mohs hardness of 3 to 3.5 and a specific gravity of 7.2 to 8.1.

It was first described in 1845 in the Algodones mines, Coquimbo, Chile. It was named after Polish mineralogist Ignacy Domeyko (1802–1889) by Wilhelm Haidinger.

== Uses ==
Domeykite, being a minor copper ore, is used for obtaining copper. It can also be polished and used for ornamental purposes.

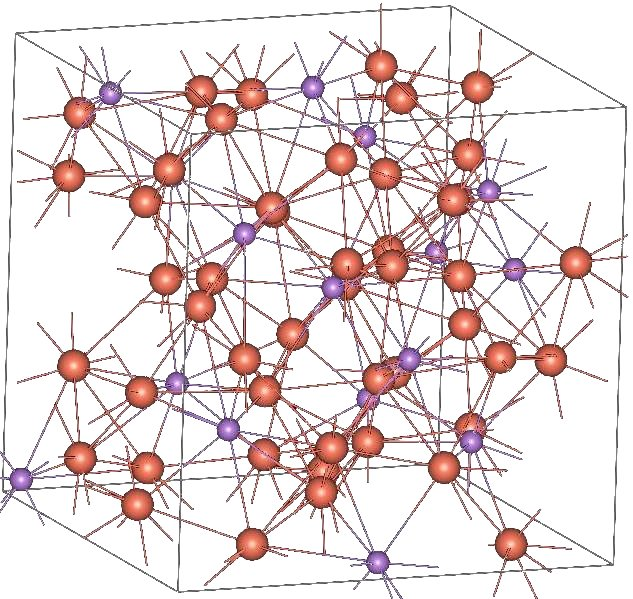
Crystal structure of domeykite

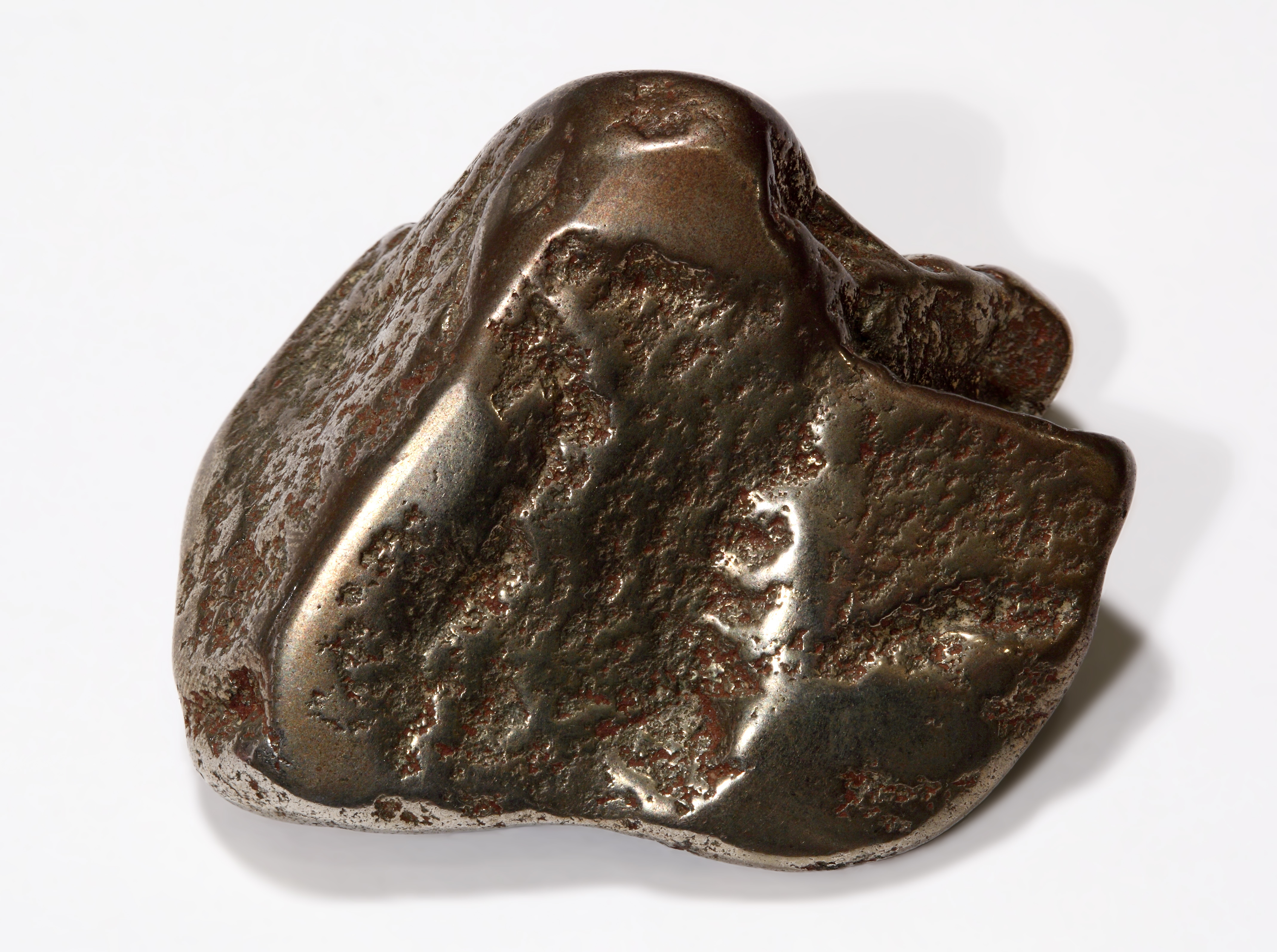
Mohawkite nugget, a mixture of domeykite, algodonite and native copper (50 × 40 × 28 mm)

== See also ==
- List of minerals
- List of minerals named after people
