= Heazlewoodite =

Sulfide mineral

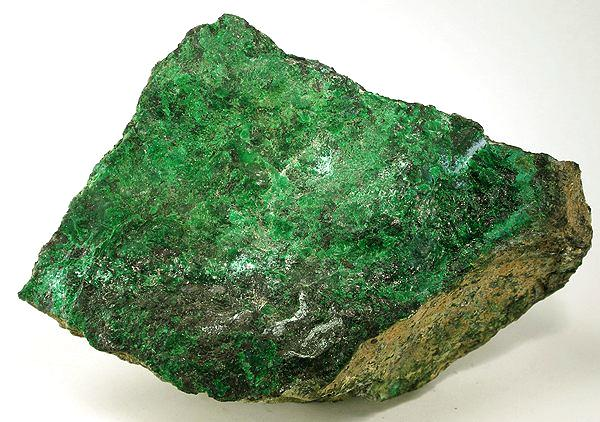
- Zaratite (emerald-green coating), hellyerite (powder-blue) and heazlewoodite (light bronze)

General
- Category: Sulfide mineral
- Formula: Ni_{3}S_{2}
- IMA symbol: Hzl
- Strunz classification: 2.BB.05
- Crystal system: Trigonal
- Crystal class: Trapezohedral (32); H-M symbol: (32)
- Space group: R32

Identification
- Color: Pale bronze
- Crystal habit: Disseminated granular to massive
- Twinning: Possibly the cause of mosaic structure seen in polished section
- Cleavage: None
- Mohs scale hardness: 4
- Luster: Metallic
- Diaphaneity: Opaque
- Specific gravity: 5.82
- Optical properties: Anisotropy – Strong, brown to bluish gray

Heazlewoodite, Ni_{3}S_{2}, is a rare sulfur-poor nickel sulfide mineral found in serpentinitized dunite. It occurs as disseminations and masses of opaque, metallic light bronze to brassy yellow grains which crystallize in the trigonal crystal system. It has a hardness of 4, a specific gravity of 5.82. Heazlewoodite was first described in 1896 from Heazlewood, Tasmania, Australia.

== Paragenesis ==
Heazlewoodite is formed within terrestrial rocks by metamorphism of peridotite and dunite via a process of nucleation. Heazlewoodite is the least sulfur saturated of nickel sulfide minerals and is only formed via metamorphic exsolution of sulfur from the lattice of metamorphic olivine.

Heazlewoodite is thought to form from sulfur and nickel which exist in pristine olivine in trace amounts, and which are driven out of the olivine during metamorphic processes. Magmatic olivine generally has up to ~4000 ppm Ni and up to 2500 ppm S within the crystal lattice, as contaminants and substituting for other transition metals with similar ionic radii (Fe^{2+} and Mg^{2+}).

During metamorphism, sulfur and nickel within the olivine lattice are reconstituted into metamorphic sulfide minerals, chiefly millerite, during serpentinization and talc carbonate alteration. When metamorphic olivine is produced, the propensity for this mineral to resorb sulfur, and for the sulfur to be removed via the concomitant loss of volatiles from the serpentinite, tends to lower sulfur fugacity.

In this environment, nickel sulfide mineralogy converts to the lowest-sulfur state available, which is heazlewoodite.

== Occurrence ==
Heazlewoodite is known from few ultramafic intrusions within terrestrial rocks. The Honeymoon Well ultramafic intrusive, Western Australia is known to contain heazlewoodite-millerite sulfide assemblages within serpentinized olivine adcumulate dunite, formed from the metamorphic process.

The mineral is also reported, again in association with millerite, from the ultramafic rocks of New Caledonia.

This mineral has been found in meteorites including irons and CV carbonaceous chondrites.

== See also ==
- Dunite or peridotite
- Glossary of meteoritics
- Metamorphism
- Millerite
- Olivine
- Polydymite
- Serpentinite
- Vaesite
