= Arsenide mineral =

An arsenide mineral is a mineral that contains arsenide as its main anion. Arsenides are grouped with the sulfides in both the Dana and Strunz mineral classification systems.

== Examples ==
- algodonite Cu_{6}As
- domeykite Cu_{3}As
- löllingite FeAs_{2}
- nickeline NiAs
- rammelsbergite NiAs_{2}
- safflorite (Co,Fe)As_{2}
- skutterudite (Co,Ni)As_{3}
- sperrylite PtAs_{2}
