= Villamanínite =

Copper sulfide mineral

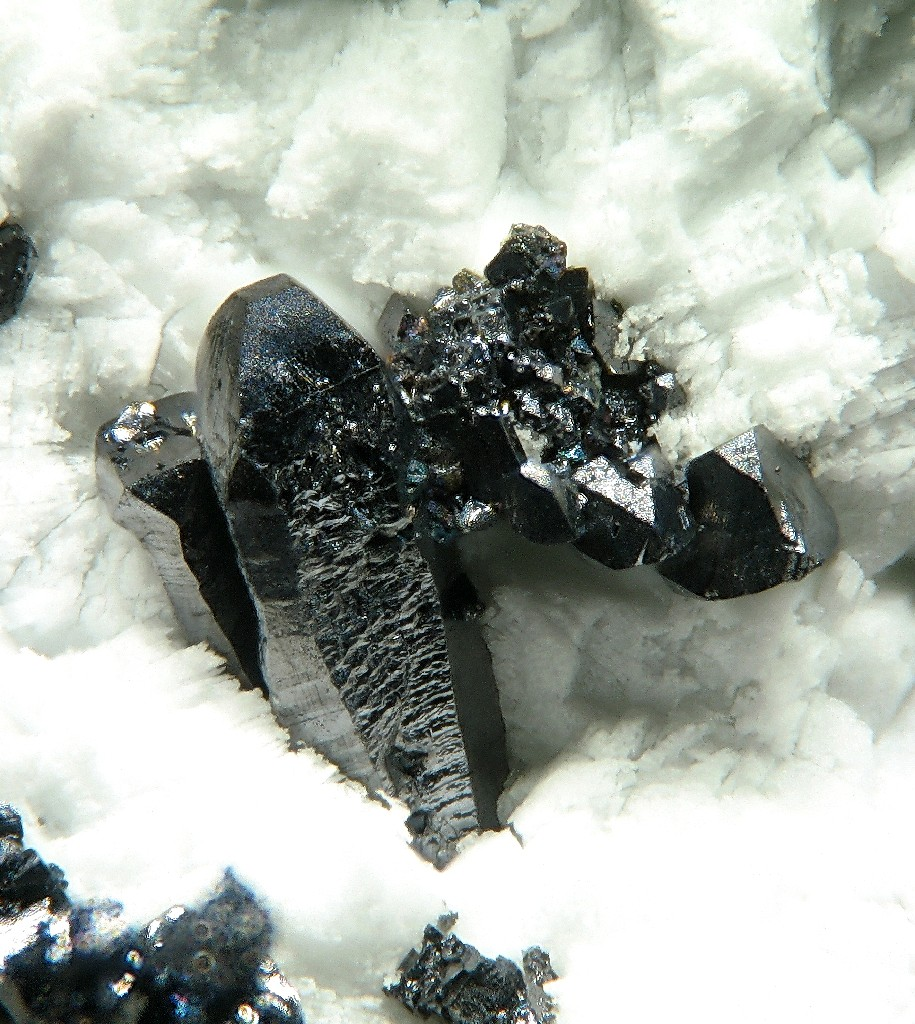
- Villamanínite. Providencia mine, Cármenes, León (Spain)

General
- Category: Sulfide mineral
- Formula: (Cu,Ni,Co,Fe)S_{2}
- IMA symbol: Vil
- Strunz classification: 2.EB.05a
- Crystal system: Cubic

Identification
- Color: Iron-black
- Crystal habit: Octahedric crystals, massive
- Fracture: Brittle
- Mohs scale hardness: 4.5
- Luster: Metallic
- Specific gravity: 4.5
- Optical properties: Opaque

Villamanínite is a copper sulfide mineral with small amounts of other elements, belonging to group II according to the Strunz classification. It was discovered in 1920 when studying the copper minerals of the Providencia mine in the municipality of Cármenes, León (Spain). The English researchers who identified it gave it the name of villamaninite when they confused the municipality in which the mine was actually located, because Villamanín is where the ore was loaded onto the railroad for export.

Villamanínite appears in the Providencia mine in two habits: either as crystals, rough in general, cubic, cuboctahedral or octahedral, usually less than 1 mm, or as fibroradiated nodules up to 1 cm in diameter. It is found in a crystalline dolomite together with other sulfides, especially bravoite, linnaeite, bornite, tetrahedrite and pyrite. The Providencia mine is located 2.3 km west of the town of Villanueva de Pontedo, and was initially exploited between 1906 and 1914. The mining work stopped due to problems in the processing of the ore. In 1920 it was reopened, sending samples to London to study the best form for its processing. In these samples the villamaninite was discovered as a new mineral. With some interruptions, the mine remained active until 1963.

Although the presence of villamanínite has also been reported in about a dozen sites around the world, the Providencia mine so far remains the only place where samples visible to the naked eye can be obtained.
