= Alloclasite =

Sulfosalt mineral

General
- Category: Minerals
- Formula: (Co,Fe)AsS
- IMA symbol: All

Identification
- Color: Steel gray to silver
- Fracture: Irregular/Uneven, Sub-Conchoidal
- Mohs scale hardness: 5
- Luster: Metallic
- Streak: Nearly black
- Diaphaneity: Opaque
- Specific gravity: 5.95

Alloclasite, or (Co,Fe)AsS, is a sulfosalt mineral (IMA symbol: Acl). It is a member of the arsenopyrite group. Alloclasite crystallizes in the monoclinic system and typically forms as columnar to radiating acicular prismatic clusters. It is an opaque steel-gray to silver-white, with a metallic luster and a black streak. It is brittle with perfect cleavage, a Mohs hardness of 5 and a specific gravity of 5.91–5.95.

It was first described in 1866 for an occurrence in Romania. Its name is derived from Greek for "other" and "to break", in reference to its distinct cleavage which distinguished it from the similar appearing mineral marcasite.

The mineral is monoclinic in the P2_{1} space group.
