= Pararealgar =

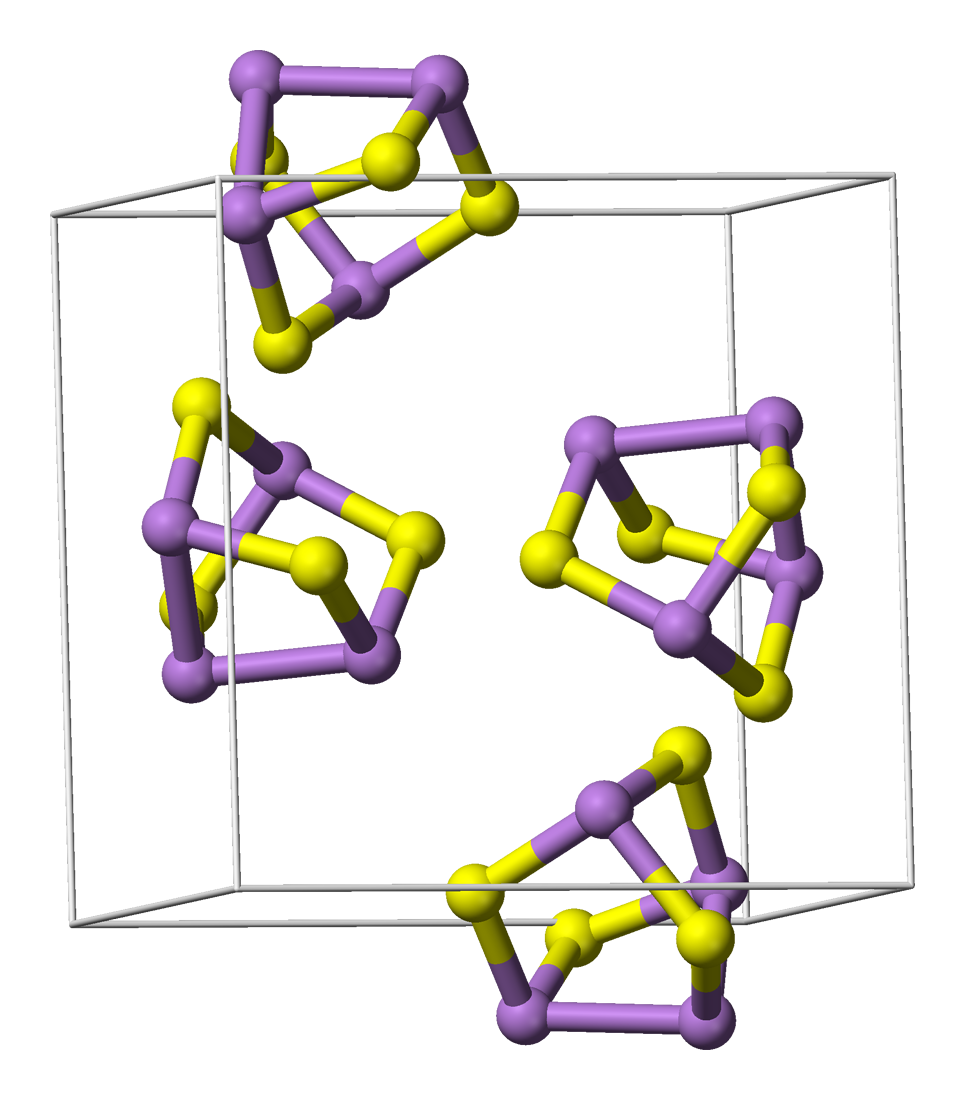

General
- Category: Sulfide mineral
- Formula: As_{4}S_{4}
- IMA symbol: Prlg
- Strunz classification: 2.FA.15b
- Crystal system: Monoclinic
- Crystal class: Prismatic (2/m) (same H-M symbol)
- Space group: P2_{1}/c
- Unit cell: a = 9.909 Å, b = 9.655 Å, c = 8.502 Å; β = 97.20°; Z = 16

Identification
- Colour: Bright yellow when powdery, to yellow-orange and orange-brown when granular
- Crystal habit: Fine powder to granular
- Fracture: Uneven
- Tenacity: Brittle
- Mohs scale hardness: 1 – 1.5
- Lustre: Vitreous to resinous
- Streak: Bright yellow
- Diaphaneity: Translucent
- Specific gravity: 3.52
- Optical properties: Biaxial (?)
- Birefringence: 2.02
- Pleochroism: High: x = orange yellow, y = bright yellow, z = orange red

Pararealgar is an arsenic sulfide mineral with the chemical formula As_{4}S_{4}, also represented as AsS. It forms gradually from realgar under exposure to light. Its name derives from the fact that its elemental composition is identical to realgar, As_{4}S_{4}. It is soft with a Mohs hardness of 1 - 1.5, is yellow orange in colour, and its monoclinic prismatic crystals are very brittle, easily crumbling to powder.

It is one of the sulfides of arsenic and is one of two isomers of As_{4}S_{4}. It forms upon exposure of the symmetrical isomer to light. Its name derives from the fact that its elemental composition is identical to realgar, As_{4}S_{4}.

== Structure ==
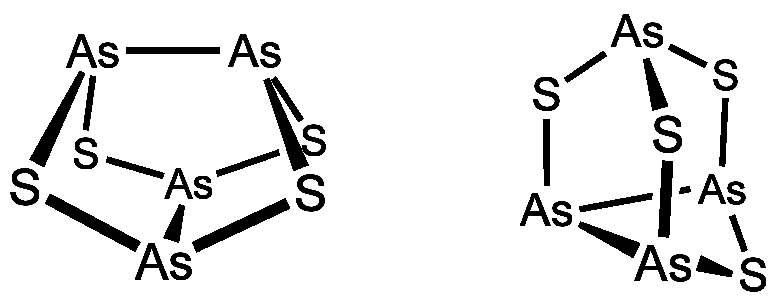
The two isomers of As_{4}S_{4}: realgar (left) and pararealgar.

Both isomers of As_{4}S_{4} are molecular, in contrast to the other main sulfide of arsenic, orpiment (As_{2}S_{3}), which is polymeric. In pararealgar, there are three kinds of As centres (and three kinds of S centres). The molecule has C_{s} symmetry. In realgar, the four As (and four S) centres are equivalent and the molecule has D_{2d} symmetry. An analogous pair of isomers is also recognized for the corresponding phosphorus sulfides P_{4}S_{4}.

== Occurrence ==
Pararealgar occurs as an alteration product of realgar in stibnite-bearing quartz veins typically as a result of exposure to light. It occurs associated with realgar, stibnite, tetrahedrite, arsenopyrite, duranusite, native arsenic, arsenolite, native sulfur, lepidocrocite and pyrite.

It was first described in 1980 for an occurrence in the Grey Rock Mine, Truax Creek, Bridge River area, Lillooet Mining Division, British Columbia, Canada. It has since been reported from a variety of locations worldwide.

=== Formation ===
Pararealgar is an alteration product of realgar resulting from exposure to light. The process of alteration is dependent on the wavelength of light, with alteration only occurring at wavelengths longer than approximately 500 nm, in the visible light spectrum.

In realgar's crystal structure, each arsenic atom is bonded to two sulfur atoms and one other arsenic atom. The As–As bonds are 30% weaker than the As–S bonds and certain wavelengths of lights interact with the crystal structure of realgar, breaking the weaker bonds between arsenic atoms. The free As formed as a result of this process destabilises the realgar structure, causing the realgar to become powdery pararealgar without changing overall chemical composition.
