= Skutterudite =

Cobalt arsenide mineral

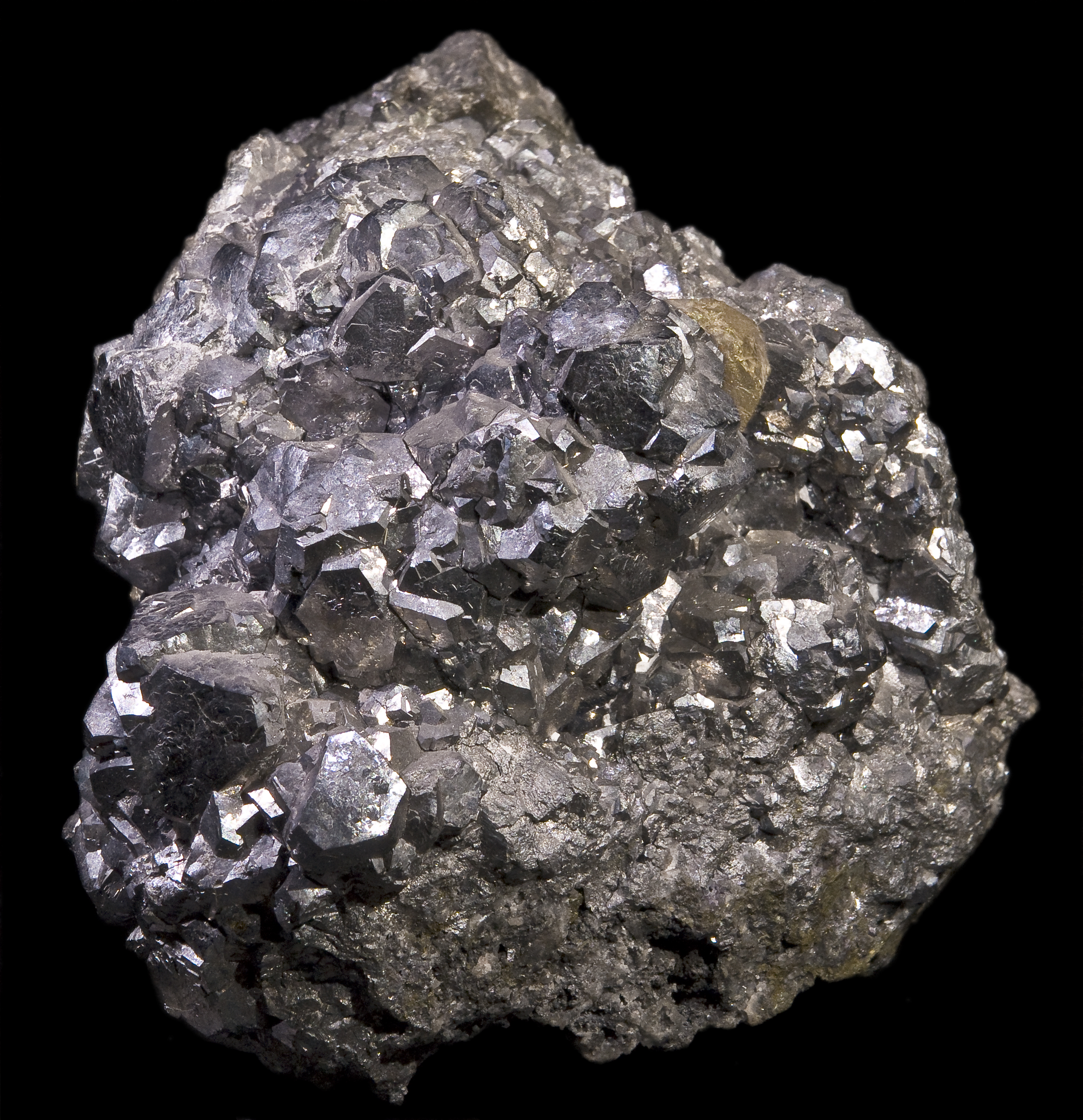
- Skutterudite from Bou Azzer, Morocco

General
- Category: Arsenide mineral
- Formula: CoAs_{3}
- IMA symbol: Skt
- Strunz classification: 2.EC.05
- Crystal system: Cubic
- Crystal class: Diploidal (m3̅); H-M symbol: (2/m 3̅)
- Space group: Im3̅
- Unit cell: a = 8.204 Å, Z = 8

Identification
- Color: Tin-white to silver-gray, tarnishes gray or iridescent; in polished section, gray, creamy or golden white
- Crystal habit: Crystals are cubes, octahedra, dodecahedra, rarely prismatic; in skeletal growth forms, distorted aggregates; also massive, granular
- Twinning: On {112} as sixlings and complex shapes
- Cleavage: Distinct on {001} and {111}; in traces on {011}
- Fracture: Conchoidal to uneven
- Mohs scale hardness: 5.5–6
- Luster: Metallic
- Streak: Black
- Diaphaneity: Opaque
- Specific gravity: 6.5

Skutterudite is a cobalt arsenide mineral containing variable amounts of nickel and iron substituting for cobalt with the ideal formula CoAs_{3}. Some references give the arsenic a variable formula subscript of 2–3. High nickel varieties are referred to as nickel-skutterudite, previously chloanthite. It is a hydrothermal ore mineral found in moderate to high temperature veins with other Ni-Co minerals. Associated minerals are arsenopyrite, native silver, erythrite, annabergite, nickeline, cobaltite, silver sulfosalts, native bismuth, calcite, siderite, barite and quartz. It is mined as an ore of cobalt and nickel with a by-product of arsenic.

The crystal structure of this mineral has been found to be exhibited by several compounds with important technological uses.

The mineral has a bright metallic luster, and is tin white or light steel gray in color with a black streak. The specific gravity is 6.5 and the hardness is 5.5–6. Its crystal structure is isometric with cube and octahedron forms similar to that of pyrite. The arsenic content gives a garlic odor when heated or crushed.

== Origins ==
Skutterudite has been known since the Middle Ages, when it was used in the production of smalt. It was discovered in the Skuterud Mines, Modum, Buskerud, Norway, in 1845. Smaltite is an alternative name for the mineral. Notable occurrences include Cobalt, Ontario and Franklin, New Jersey, in the United States.

== Structure ==
The skutterudite unit cell.

The crystal structure of the skutterudite mineral was determined in 1928 by Oftedahl to be cubic, belonging to space group Im 3̅ (number 204).

The unit cell of a skutterudite consists of a total of 32 atoms, arranged in eight smaller cubes composed of cobalt atoms, which form octahedra with cobalt at the center. Six of these cubes are filled with planar square rings of arsenic, each oriented parallel to one of the unit cell's edges. In its structure, at the 2a Wyckoff position, there are two large structural voids—each approximately five angstroms in size—that can be filled with impurity atoms. Together with the unit cell size and the assigned space group, the parameters mentioned above fully describe the crystalline structure of the material. This structure is commonly referred to as a skutterudite structure.

== Applications ==
Materials with a skutterudite structure are studied as a low cost thermoelectric material with low thermal conductivity. These materials have been synthesized with a thermoelectric figure of merit (ZT) close to 1 at 800 kelvins. A relatively high dimensionless figure of merit has been observed in a polycrystalline skutterudite partially filled with ytterbium ions. The small-diameter but heavy ytterbium atoms partially occupy the voids in the CoSb_{3} host structure, resulting in low thermal conductivity values while the favorable electronic properties are not substantially disrupted by the addition of ytterbium.
