= Algodonite =

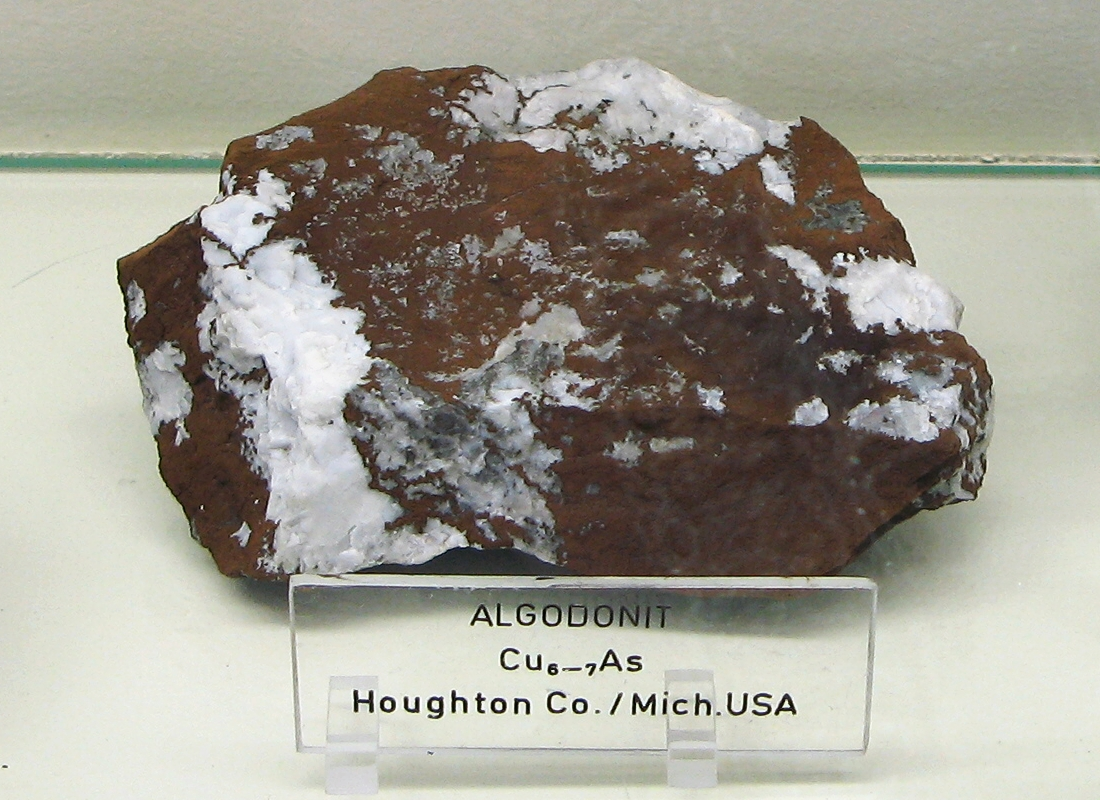
- Algodonite – Houghton County, Michigan, US

General
- Category: Sulfide mineral
- Formula: Cu_{6}As
- IMA symbol: Ago
- Strunz classification: 2.AA.10a
- Crystal system: Hexagonal
- Crystal class: Dihexagonal dipyramidal (6/mmm); H-M symbol: (6/m 2/m 2/m)
- Space group: P6_{3}/mmc
- Unit cell: a = 2.6, c = 4.228 [Å]; Z = 2

Identification
- Formula mass: 456.2 g/mol
- Color: Gray, silver white, steel gray, tarnishes dull bronze
- Crystal habit: Massive, granular. Common texture observed in granite and other igneous rock
- Fracture: Sub-conchoidal
- Mohs scale hardness: 4
- Luster: Metallic
- Diaphaneity: Opaque
- Specific gravity: 8.38 (measured), 8.72 (calculated)
- Other characteristics: Non-magnetic, non-fluorescent

Algodonite is a copper arsenide mineral with formula: Cu_{6}As. It is a gray white metallic mineral crystallizing in the hexagonal system. It has a Mohs hardness of 4 and a specific gravity of 8.38 – 8.72.

It was first described in 1857 from the Algodones silver mine, Coquimbo, Chile.
