= Millerite =

Nickel sulfide mineral

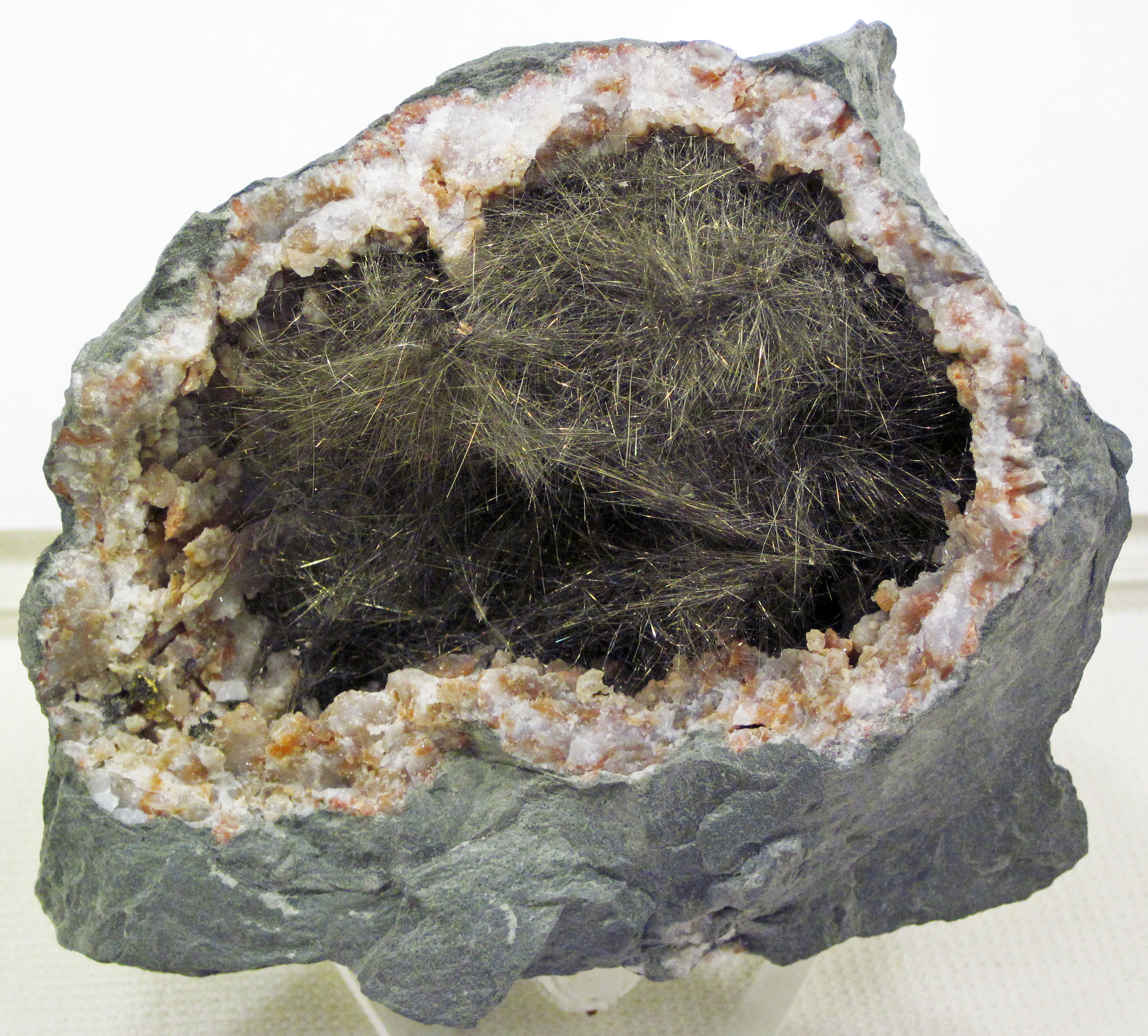

General
- Category: Sulfide mineral
- Formula: NiS
- IMA symbol: Mlr
- Strunz classification: 2.CC.20
- Crystal system: Trigonal
- Crystal class: Ditrigonal pyramidal (3m) (same H-M symbol)
- Space group: R3m
- Unit cell: a = 9.607 Å, c = 3.143 Å; Z = 9

Identification
- Colour: Pale brass-yellow to bronze-yellow, tarnishes to iridescence
- Crystal habit: Typically acicular (needle-like) often in radial sprays – also massive
- Cleavage: Perfect on {101̅1} and {011̅2} – obscured by typical form
- Fracture: Uneven
- Tenacity: Brittle; capillary crystals elastic
- Mohs scale hardness: 3–3.5
- Luster: Metallic
- Streak: Greenish black
- Diaphaneity: Opaque
- Specific gravity: 5.3–5.5
- Other characteristics: brittle and becomes magnetic on heating

Millerite or nickel blende is a nickel sulfide mineral, NiS. It is brassy in colour and has an acicular habit, often forming radiating masses and furry aggregates. It can be distinguished from pentlandite by crystal habit, its duller colour, and general lack of association with pyrite or pyrrhotite.

== Paragenesis ==
Millerite is a common metamorphic mineral replacing pentlandite within serpentinite ultramafics. It is formed in this way by removal of sulfur from pentlandite or other nickeliferous sulfide minerals during metamorphism or metasomatism.

Millerite is also formed from sulfur poor olivine cumulates by nucleation. Millerite is thought to form from sulfur and nickel which exist in pristine olivine in trace amounts, and which are driven out of the olivine during metamorphic processes. Magmatic olivine generally has up to ~4000 ppm Ni and up to 2500 ppm S within the crystal lattice, as contaminants and substituting for other transition metals with similar ionic radii (Fe^{2+} and Mn^{2+}).

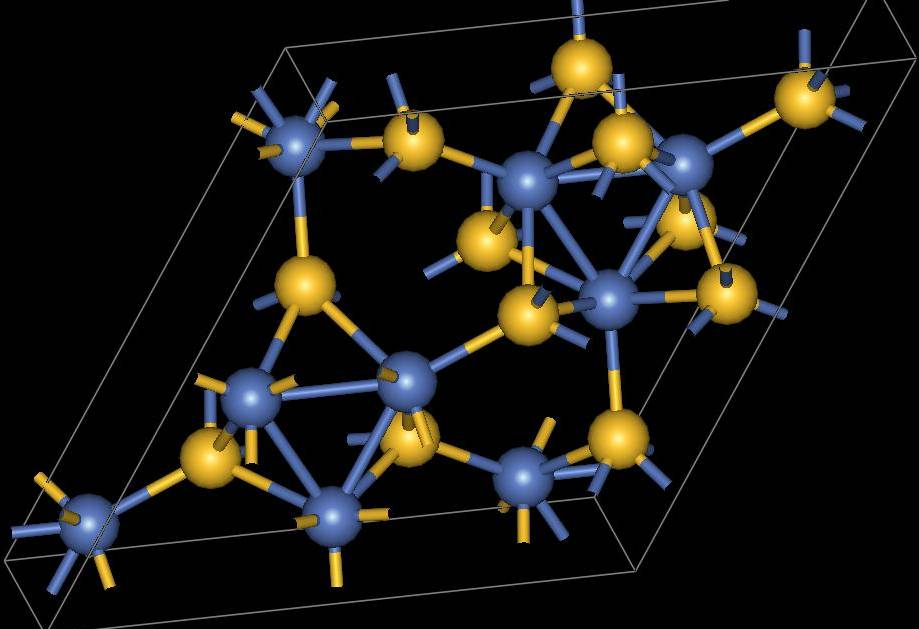
Millerite structure

During metamorphism, sulfur and nickel within the olivine lattice are reconstituted into metamorphic sulfide minerals, chiefly millerite, during serpentinization and talc carbonate alteration. When metamorphic olivine is produced, the propensity for this mineral to resorb sulfur, and for the sulfur to be removed via the concomitant loss of volatiles from the serpentinite, tends to lower sulfur fugacity.

This forms disseminated needle like millerite crystals dispersed throughout the rock mass.

Millerite may be associated with heazlewoodite and is considered a transitional stage in the metamorphic production of heazlewoodite via the above process.

== Economic importance ==
Millerite, when found in enough concentration, is a very important ore of nickel because, for its mass as a sulfide mineral, it contains a higher percentage of nickel than pentlandite. This means that, for every percent of millerite, an ore contains more nickel than an equivalent percentage of pentlandite sulfide.

Millerite forms an important ore constituent of the Silver Swan, Wannaway, Cliffs, Honeymoon Well, Yakabindie and Mt Keith (MKD5) orebodies. It is an accessory mineral associated with nickel laterite deposits in New Caledonia.

== Occurrence ==
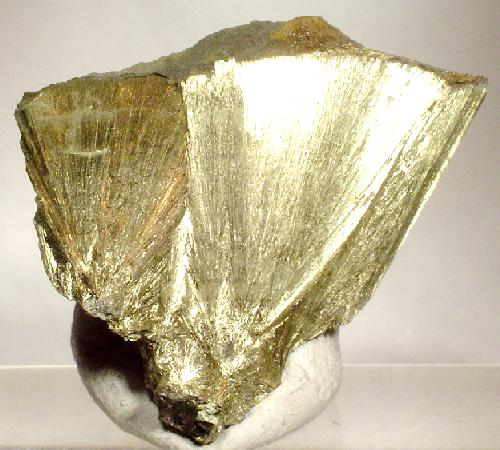
Lustrous mass of intergrown millerite needles from Kalgoorlie, Western Australia (size: 3.9 x 3.5 x 2.2 cm)

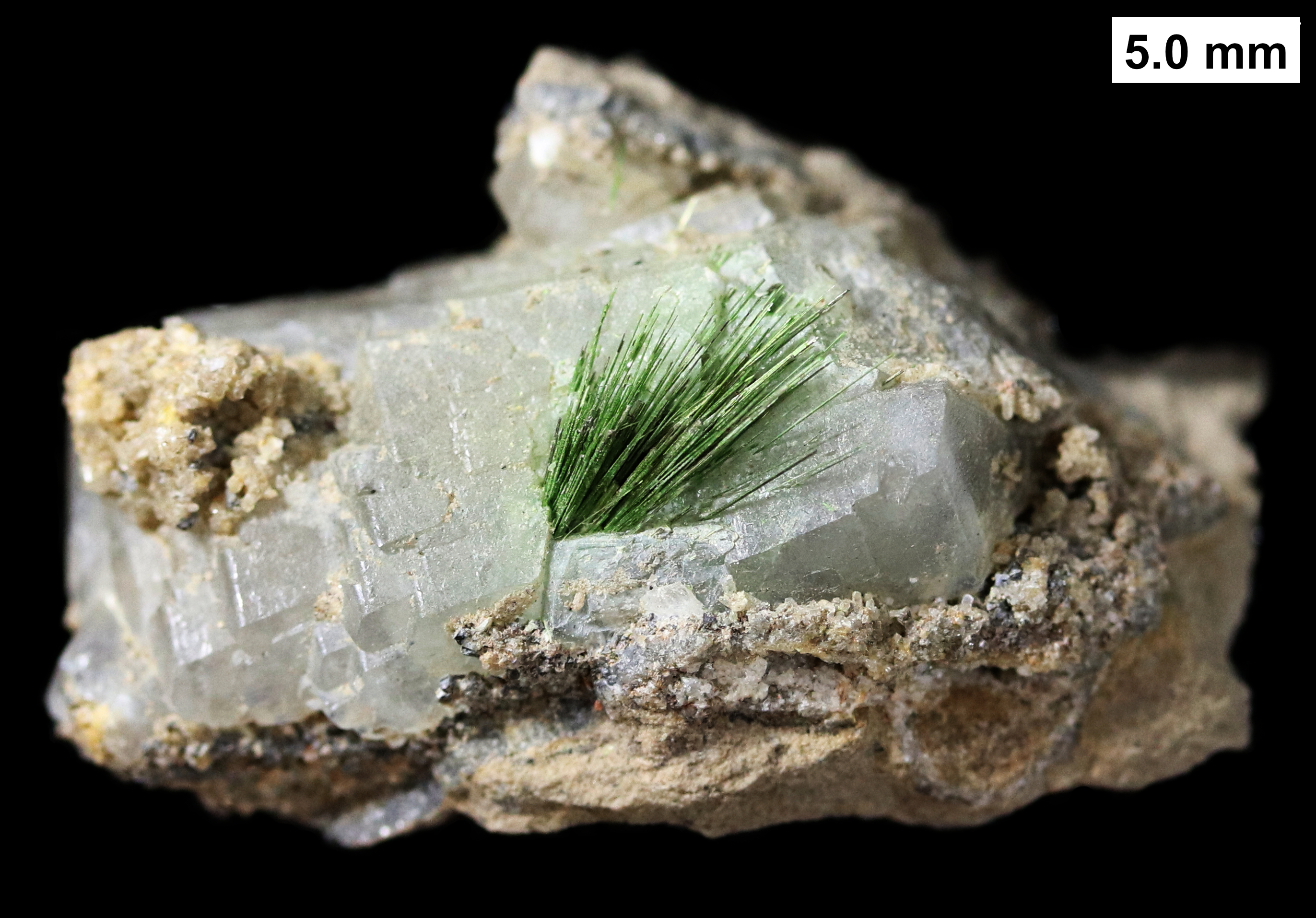
Millerite needles partially encased in calcite and oxidized to zaratite on their surfaces; from the Devonian Milwaukee Formation of Wisconsin

Millerite is found as a metamorphic replacement of pentlandite within the Silver Swan nickel deposit, Western Australia, and throughout the many ultramafic serpentinite bodies of the Yilgarn craton, Western Australia, generally as a replacement of metamorphosed pentlandite. There is one known occurrence of millerite in South Africa, near Pafuri in the Transvaal. The deposit has never been commercially mined.

It is commonly found as radiating clusters of acicular needle-like crystals in cavities in sulfide rich limestone and dolomite or in geodes. It is also found in nickel-iron meteorites, such as CK carbonaceous chondrites.

Millerite was discovered by Wilhelm Haidinger in 1845 in the coal mines of Wales. It was named for British mineralogist William Hallowes Miller. The mineral is quite rare in specimen form, and the most common source of the mineral is in the Halls Gap area of Lincoln County, Kentucky in the United States.

== See also ==
- List of minerals
- List of minerals named after people
- Nickel Mines, Pennsylvania
