= Loellingite =

Iron arsenide mineral

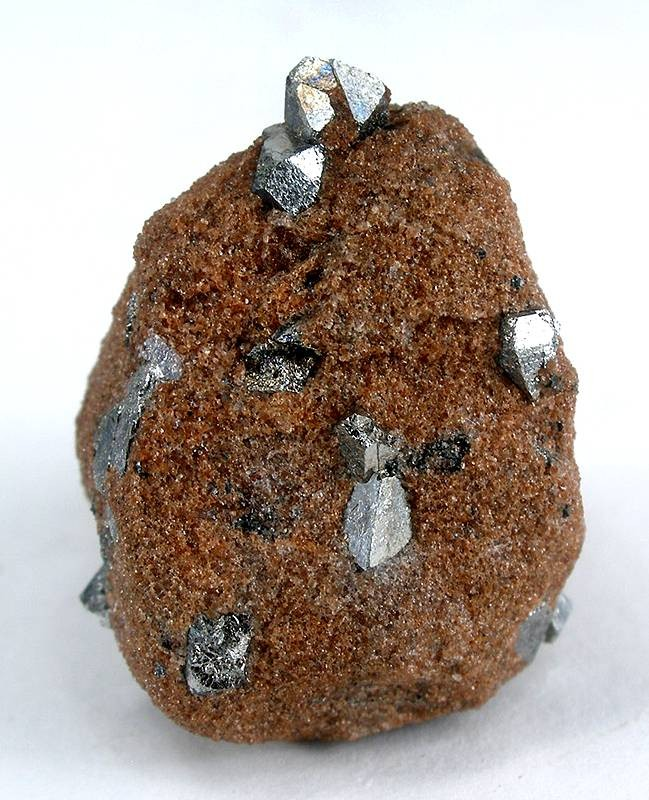
- Sharp, lustrous loellingite (and/or arsenopyrite) crystals to 4 mm on gossan matrix. Locality: Broken Hill Ore Deposit, New South Wales, Australia. Size: 2.4 × 2.2 × 2.0 cm.

General
- Category: Arsenide mineral
- Formula: FeAs_{2}
- IMA symbol: Lö
- Strunz classification: 2.EB.15a
- Crystal system: Orthorhombic
- Crystal class: Dipyramidal (mmm); H-M symbol: (2/m 2/m 2/m)
- Space group: Pnnm
- Unit cell: a = 5.16, b = 5.93 c = 3.05 [Å]; Z = 2

Identification
- Color: Steel grey to silvery white
- Crystal habit: Prismatic to pyramidal crystals, massive
- Twinning: On {001}, possibly trillings, polysynthetic on {101}
- Cleavage: Rare, distinct on {010}, {101}
- Fracture: Uneven
- Mohs scale hardness: 5–5.5
- Luster: Metallic
- Streak: Grayish black
- Specific gravity: 7.1–7.5
- Optical properties: Distinctly anisotropic in reflected light

Loellingite, also spelled löllingite, is an iron arsenide mineral with formula FeAs_{2}. It is often found associated with arsenopyrite (FeAsS) from which it is hard to distinguish. Cobalt, nickel and sulfur substitute in the structure. The orthorhombic lollingite group includes the nickel iron arsenide rammelsbergite and the cobalt iron arsenide safflorite. Leucopyrite is an old synonym for loellingite.

It forms opaque silvery white orthorhombic prismatic crystals often exhibiting crystal twinning. It also occurs in anhedral masses and tarnishes on exposure to air. It has a Mohs hardness of 5.5 to 6 and a quite high specific gravity of 7.1 to 7.5. It becomes magnetic after heating.

Loellingite was first described in 1845 at the Lölling district in Carinthia, Austria, for which it was named.

It occurs in mesothermal ore deposits associated with skutterudite, native bismuth, nickeline, nickel-skutterudite, siderite and calcite. It has also been reported from pegmatites.

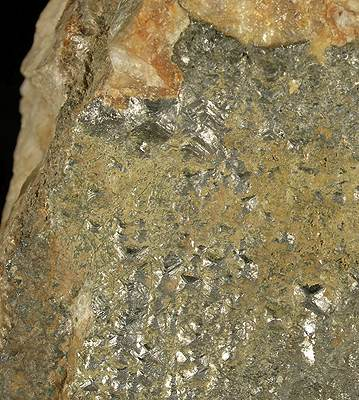
Loellingite from Franklin-Sterling (size: 10.4 × 7.0 × 6.8 cm)
