= Cobaltite =

Sulfide mineral composed of cobalt, arsenic, and sulfur

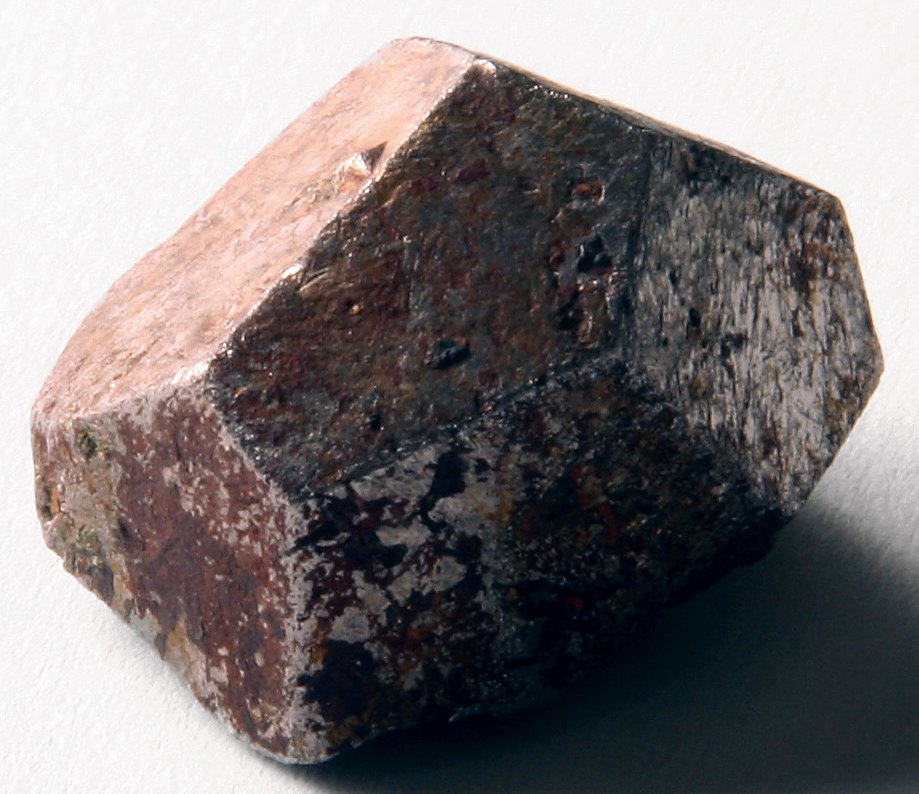
- Cobaltite from Sweden

General
- Category: Sulfide mineral
- Formula: CoAsS
- IMA symbol: Cbt
- Strunz classification: 2.EB.25
- Crystal system: Orthorhombic
- Crystal class: Pyramidal (mm2) (same H-M symbol)
- Space group: Pc2_{1}b
- Unit cell: a = 5.582 Å, b = 5.582 Å, c = 5.582 Å; Z = 4

Identification
- Color: Reddish silver white, violet steel gray to black
- Crystal habit: Granular to massive, rarely as striated crystals, pseudocubic.
- Twinning: About [111] creating pseudo-cubic forms and striations
- Cleavage: Perfect on {001}
- Fracture: Uneven
- Tenacity: Brittle
- Mohs scale hardness: 5.5
- Luster: Metallic
- Streak: Grayish-black
- Diaphaneity: Opaque
- Density: 6.33 g/cm^{3}

Cobaltite is an arsenide and sulfide mineral with the mineral formula CoAsS. It is the naming mineral of the cobaltite group of minerals, whose members structurally resemble pyrite (FeS_{2}).

== History ==
Cobaltite was first described in 1797 by Klaproth. Its name stems from the contained element cobalt, whose name is attributed to the German term Kobold, referring to an "underground spirit" or "goblin". The notion of "bewitched" minerals stems from cobaltite and other cobalt ores withstanding the smelting methods of the medieval period, often producing foul-smelling, poisonous fumes in the process.

== Properties ==
Cobaltite naturally appears in the form of a tetartoid, a form of dodecahedron with chiral tetrahedral symmetry.

Its impurities may contain up to 10% iron and variable amounts of nickel.

Cobaltite can be separated from other minerals by selective, pH controlled, flotation methods, where cobalt recovery usually involves hydrometallurgy. It can also be processed with pyrometallurgical methods, such as flash smelting.

== Occurrences ==
Although rare, it is mined as a significant source of the strategically important metal cobalt. It occurs in high-temperature hydrothermal deposits and contact metamorphic rocks. It occurs in association with magnetite, sphalerite, chalcopyrite, skutterudite, allanite, zoisite, scapolite, titanite, and calcite along with numerous other Co–Ni sulfides and arsenides. It is found chiefly in Sweden, Norway, Germany, Cornwall, England, Canada, La Cobaltera, Chile, Australia, the Democratic Republic of the Congo, and Morocco. Crystals have also been found at Khetri in Rajasthan, and under the name sehta the mineral was used by Indian jewellers for producing a blue enamel on gold and silver ornaments.

Secondary weathering incrustations of erythrite, hydrated cobalt arsenate, are common.

A variety containing much iron replacing cobalt, and known as ferrocobaltite (German: Stahlkobalt), was found at Siegen in Westphalia.
