= Nickel extraction =

Process of extracting nickel from ores

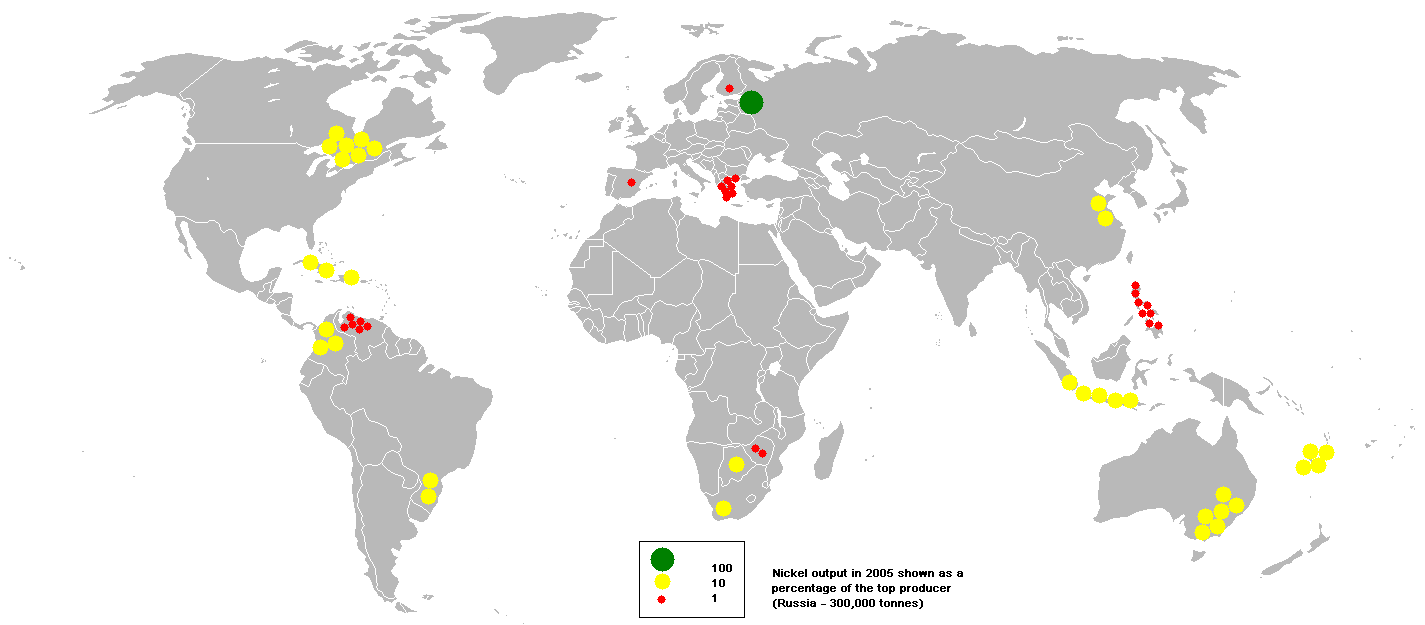
Nickel production in 2005 represented as a percentage of the largest producer: Russia with 300,000 tonnes per year.

Extractive metallurgy of nickel is the set of operations that allow the manufacture of nickel metal from ore. It also concerns the recycling of metallurgical waste containing nickel (40% of nickel consumed in 2005 was recycled).

Nickel is extracted from two types of ores: laterites and sulfides. Although 70% of nickel reserves are lateritic ores, these only account for 40% of global production. Lateritic ores are primarily used for the production of ferronickel, while sulfide ores are generally used for the production of very pure nickel.

Whether lateritic or sulfide, nickel ores are mined when their nickel content exceeds 1.3%. This low content explains the complexity and diversity of processes, determined by the nature of the ore's gangue, as well as the desired quality of nickel at the end of extraction.

== History ==
Evolution of nickel ore grade.

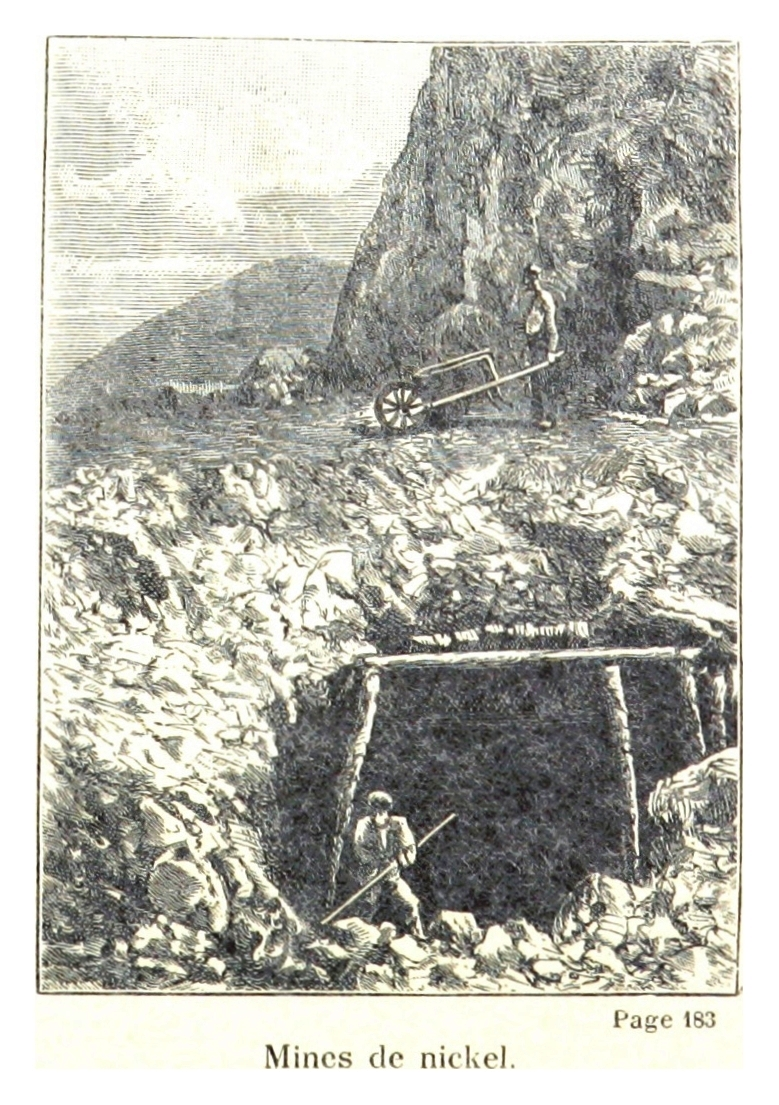
Nickel mines in New Caledonia, in Charles Lemire, Voyage à pied en Nouvelle-Calédonie et description des Nouvelles-Hébrides. Ouvrage orné de deux cartes, etc,, 1884, British Library HMNTS 10491, p. 166

Jules Garnier traveled through New Caledonia from 1863 to 1866 and discovered an ore containing a maximum of 6 to 7% nickel, which was named garnierite in his honor. Nickel production began there in 1875. At that time, there was a heated debate between those who advocated a hydrometallurgical treatment and Garnier, who opted for a pyrometallurgical process.

During the construction of the Canadian Pacific Railway in 1883, nickel was discovered in the Sudbury Basin in Ontario. This discovery led to significant European immigration. The abundance of nickel in the region earned it the nickname "Nickel Capital."

Developed in Sudbury (Canada) in 1905, the production of nickel from sulfide ores, which are also rich in copper and cobalt, quickly surpassed production from laterites.

In 1921, nickel veins were discovered in Finland in the Petsamo region. Nickel exploitation began in 1935 by the Canadian company Inco.

In 1935, Stalin decided to create the city of Norilsk in Siberia for the exploitation of a nickel deposit by the company Norilsk Nickel and a forced labor camp known as the Norillag.

After the Winter War between Russia and Finland, in 1940, a German-Soviet consortium, including IG Farben and Krupp, shared the exploitation of nickel in the Petsamo region. After World War II, the Russian nickel industry was developed by the Soviet company Norilsk Nickel.

== Primary ores ==
Evolution of annual nickel extraction according to ore types.

=== Laterites ===
Laterites are generally located in tropical regions. They are notably exploited in New Caledonia, Indonesia, the Philippines, and Cuba. This ore is mined when its nickel content exceeds 1.3%, and its cobalt content exceeds 0.1%.

Laterites are complex minerals resulting from the disintegration of oceanic peridotite floors when they emerge due to tectonic movements (as in New Caledonia). They are therefore surface deposits. The weathering of peridotite (a mixture of olivine and pyroxene) causes vertical segregation, from the soil surface to the bedrock:

- limonite, rich in hydrated iron (goethite) and low in magnesia. It forms the iron cap of the deposit;
- smectites, such as nontronite, are found in some deposits (Western Australia), beneath the limonite;
- saprolites, such as garnierite. Unlike limonite, they are rich in magnesia and poorer in iron.

The configuration of the strata changes according to climate and soil age. Each stratum measures 2 to 5 meters thick. Rain and vegetation leach the surface limonite layer, removing magnesia and silica from the original peridotite rock, enriching it with iron, nickel, and cobalt. Dissolved nickel also tends to descend through percolation, enriching the deep saprolite layer. This leaching occurs over a period of 1 to 10 million years, and its progress differs depending on the deposit.

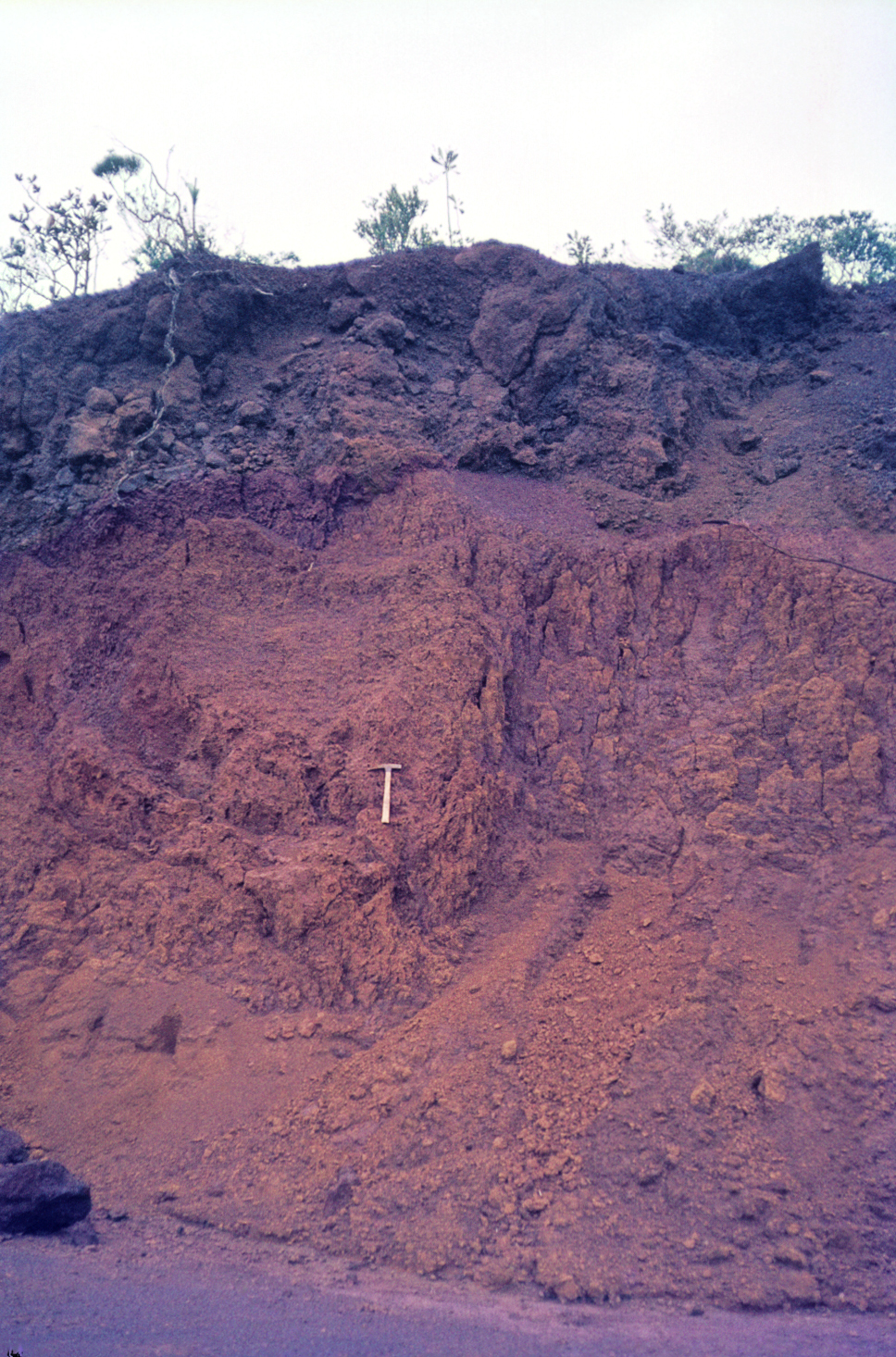
From top to bottom: lateritic crust (iron cap), soft limonite, ultramafic rock basement in Yaté, New Caledonia.

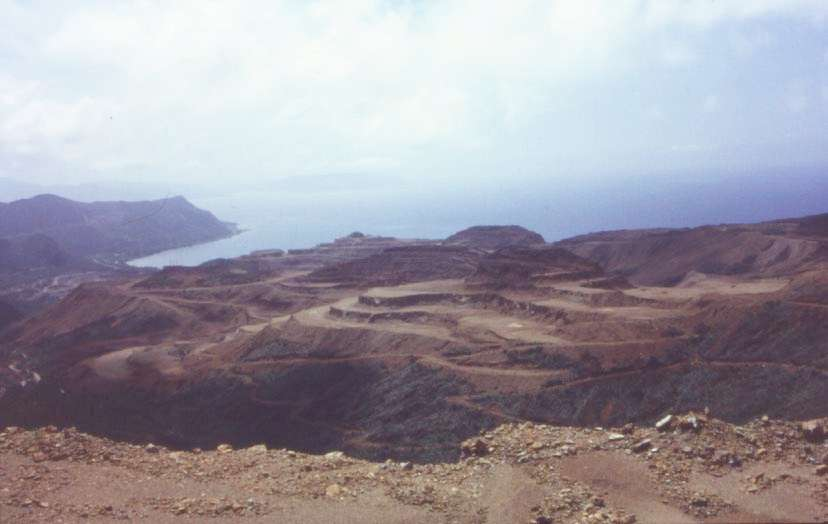
Laterite mine in Kouaoua, New Caledonia. Exploitation concerns only the surface layers.

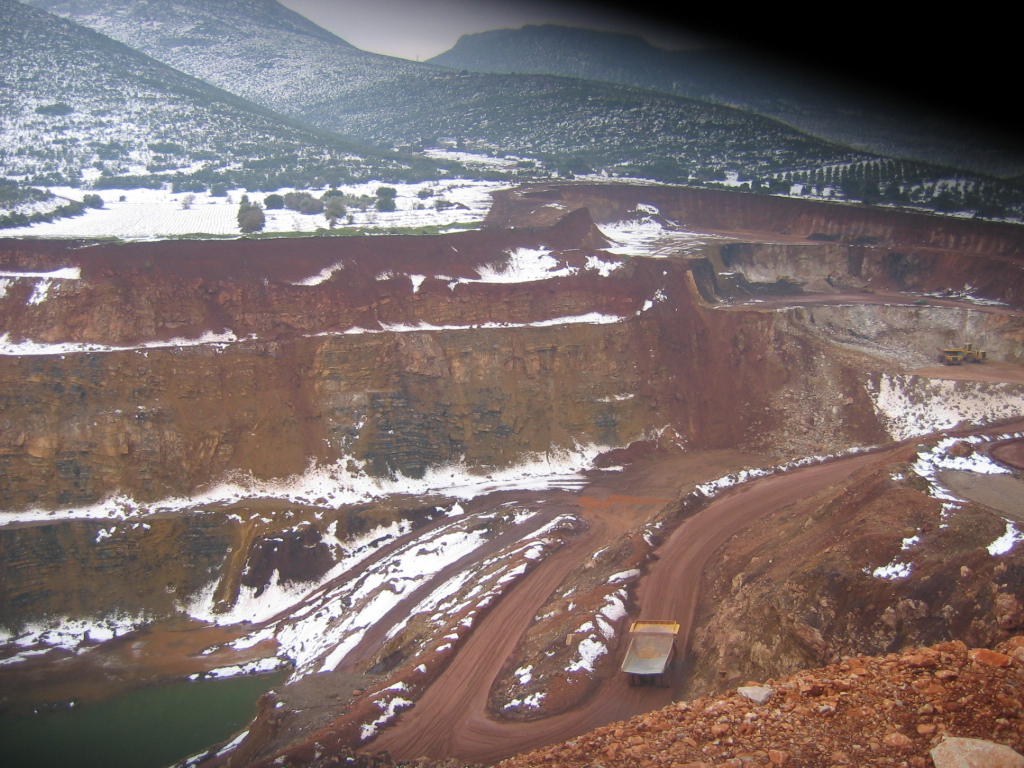
Laterite mine in Euboea, Greece, operated by Larco.

=== Sulfide ores ===
Unlike laterites, the formation of sulfide ores is independent of climate. They are found in Canada and northern Siberia. Sulfide ore deposits originate from:

- magma upwelling through the Earth's crust;
- metal concentration due to the presence of geothermal waters.

The most common mineral found in nickel sulfide deposits is pentlandite. The sulfur comes from the parent rock, and the molar ratio of nickel to iron ranges from 0.34 to 2.45, with an average of 1.15. This mineral is frequently accompanied by pyrrhotite and chalcopyrite, as well as more or less precious metals such as cobalt, silver, and platinum group metals. Deposits used for nickel extraction contain 1 to 3% nickel.

Except for pyrrhotite, where nickel substitutes for iron in varying proportions, sulfide nickel ore deposits contain very few minerals of nickel sulfide. Therefore, like lateritic deposits, the nature of their gangue has a significant influence on extraction processes.

Sulfide minerals that may contain nickel
Mineral	Chemical formula
Chalcopyrite	CuFeS_{2}
Magnetite	Fe_{3}O_{4}
Cubanite	CuFe_{2}S_{3}
Chromite	(Mg,Fe)Cr_{2}O_{4}
Galena	PbS
Sphalerite	ZnS
Bornite	Cu_{5}FeS_{4}
Mackinawite	(Fe,Ni,Co)S
Valleriite	Cu_{3}Fe_{4}S_{7}

Nickel sulfide and similar minerals
Mineral	Chemical formula	Theoretical nickel content (% by weight)
Pentlandite	Ni_{9}Fe_{9}S_{3}	34.2
Millerite	NiS	64.7
Heazlewoodite	Ni_{3}S_{2}	73.4
Polydymite	Ni_{3}S_{4}	57.9
Violarite	Ni_{2}FeS_{4}	38.9
Siegenite	(Co,Ni)_{3}S_{4}	28.9
Fletcherite	Ni_{2}CuS_{4}	75.9
Nickeline	NiAs	43.9
Maucherite	Ni_{11}As_{8}	51.9
Rammelsbergite	NiAs_{2}	35.4
Breithauptite	NiSb	32.5
Annabergite	Ni_{3}As_{2}O_{8}·8H_{2}O	34.2
Pyrrhotite	(Ni,Fe)_{7}S_{8}	1–5

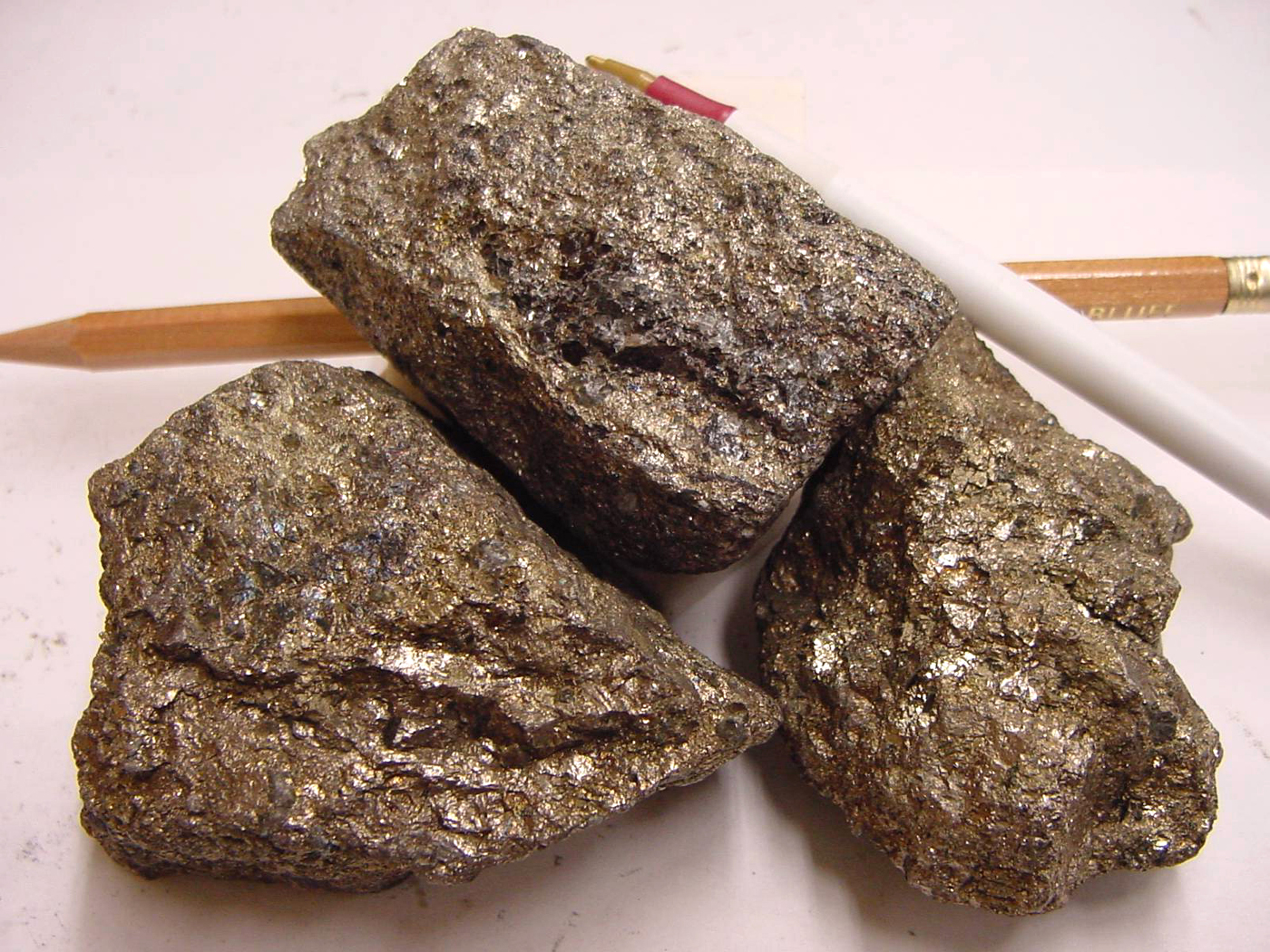
American pentlandite.

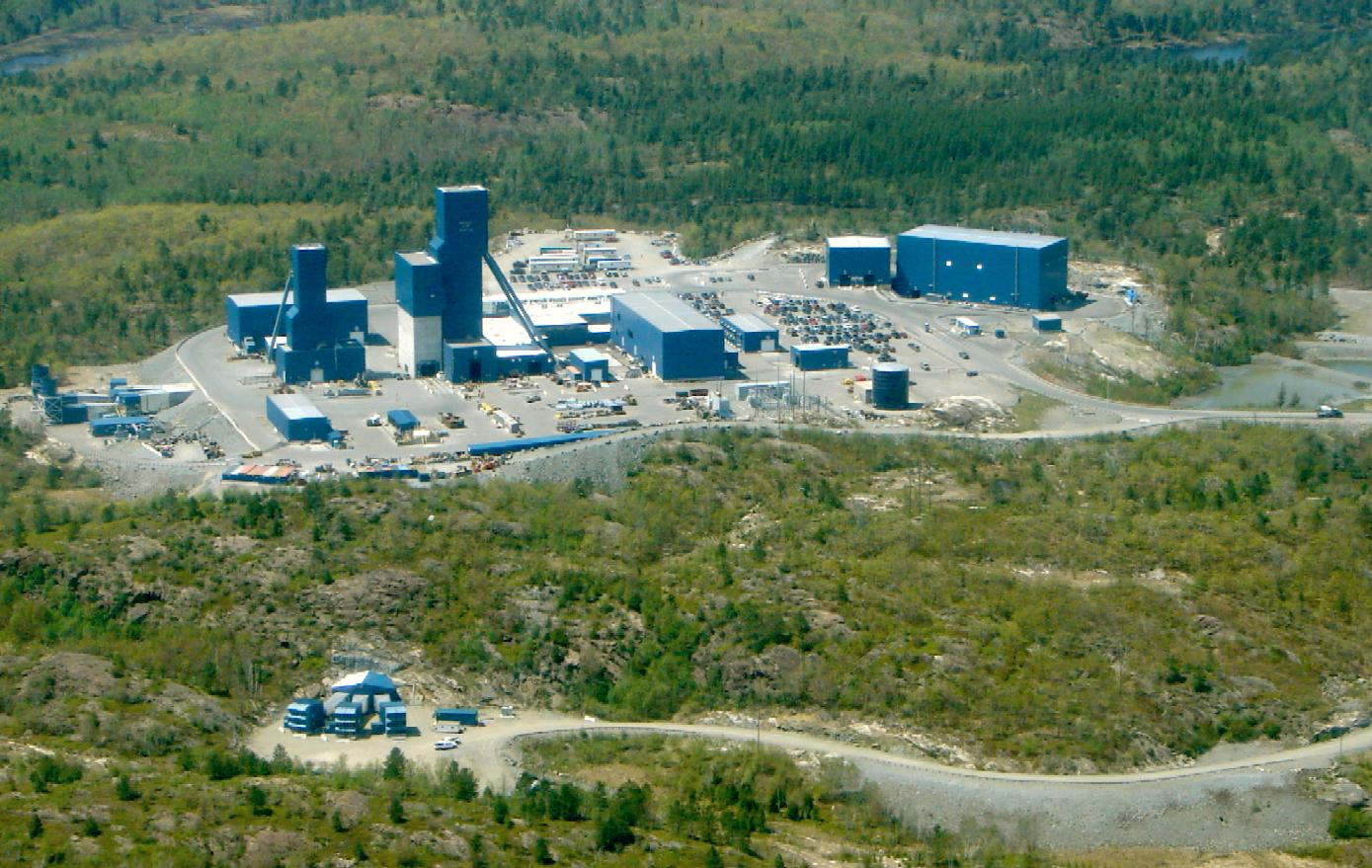
Headframes of the Nickel Rim South Mine, Sudbury, Canada. Sulfide deposits generally develop at depth.

== Extraction ==
Main metallurgical routes for nickel extraction.

=== Mining extraction ===
==== Lateritic deposits ====
It is important to distinguish between surface ores (limonite and smectite) and deep ores (saprolite) in the deposit. Indeed, the high iron content in limonite and smectite penalizes pyrometallurgical processes, whereas when dissolved in hot sulfuric acid, iron precipitates as hematite or jarosite. Moreover, the sulfuric acid consumption due to magnesia is economically acceptable, as it does not exceed 3% of the ore weight to be treated.

Conversely, the magnesia content of saprolite (20%) makes its hydrometallurgical treatment too costly due to sulfuric acid consumption. But the low iron content (15%) allows obtaining a rich ferronickel containing 20 to 30% nickel. Some cobalt is present in this ferroalloy, but in too small a quantity to influence steel customers.

=== Ore concentration by hydrometallurgy ===
Laterites, which typically contain between 1.3 and 2.5% nickel, are crushed, screened, and, if the process is wet, hydrocycloned to remove as much waste as possible. This typically doubles the nickel content. The finer the grinding (down to 75 μm), the more effective the enrichment. All laterite enrichment methods are based on the principle that rich minerals are softer than minerals not yet transformed into laterites (olivine) or transformed into hard and nickel-poor products (quartz). A condition is therefore to carry out "gentle" grinding that does not affect the hardest minerals.

Limonite is leached in a sulfuric acid solution at 250 °C and 40 bar.

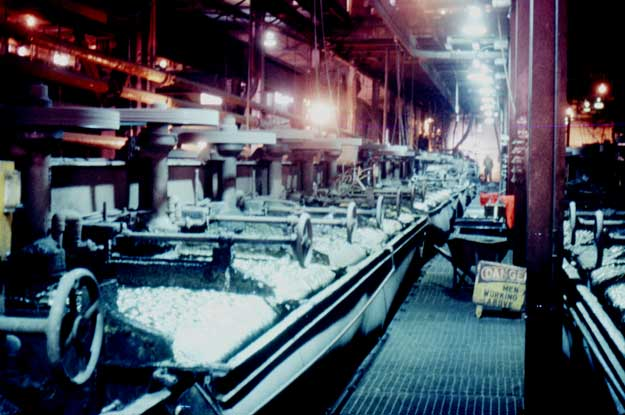
Froth flotation in a copper and nickel ore processing plant, in 1973, at Falconbridge, Ontario.

Sulfide ores are finely ground (particle size less than 50 μm), typically in two stages: a gyratory crusher followed by a ball mill working on a 50% wet product. A flotation stage allows separating:

- the sterile gangue (less than 0.3% nickel, rich in pyrrhotite)
- the nickel concentrate (10 to 20% nickel, mainly pentlandite)
- the copper concentrate.

Flotation is froth flotation with air, which consists of isolating naturally or artificially hydrophilic components (often pyrrhotite and gangue) from hydrophobic components (often pentlandite). Hydrophobic components attach to bubbles and rise in the bath, while hydrophilic ones remain in the aqueous solution. The copper and nickel concentrates are then treated by pyrometallurgy.

=== Fusion and pyrometallurgical refining ===
==== Saprolite ====
Saprolite, which contains little iron, is the only laterite suitable for fusion in an electric arc furnace. It can be used to make either ferronickel or a matte of nickel, which will be refined by pyrometallurgy.

The production of ferronickel exploits two chemical characteristics of iron and nickel:

- iron and nickel oxides are easily reduced by carbon at 800 °C through a direct reduction reaction. Alumina and magnesia are not reducible at these temperatures, while chromium(III) oxide (Cr_{2}O_{3}) and silica are to a small extent, which explains the presence of a few percent chromium and silicon in ferronickel;
- iron(II) oxide (or wüstite), which is the stable iron oxide at 800 °C, has a reducibility close to that of nickel(II) oxide: it is therefore not possible to reduce one without the other. Since iron does not add value to ferronickel, ores are selected to minimize its presence.

The concentrated saprolite ore intended for ferronickel production, which contains 35% water, is first dried in a first rotary drum (4 m in diameter and 30 m long), then calcined and pre-reduced in a large direct reduction drum (5 m in diameter and 100 m, or even 185 m, long) (Note: This configuration recalls the Krupp-Renn process, a steelmaking process of direct reduction invented in Germany in the 1930s. During the 20th century, the Japanese regularly improved this process and dedicated it to nickel extraction. At the beginning of the 21st century, the smelter of Nihon Yakin Kogyo in Ōeyama, Japan, remains the only plant in the world to use the Krupp-Renn process for ferronickel production, with a monthly production of 1,000 tonnes of luppen.) From the direct reduction drum emerges a powder, or dry calcine, containing 1.5 to 3% nickel at 900 °C, (Note: Beyond 900 °C, nickel and iron combine with silica to form less reactive silicates.) partially reduced (Note: One quarter of the nickel is in metallic form, the rest is still oxidized. Iron, which represents 15% of the powder's weight, is reduced to metal only to the extent of 5%, with 95% being FeO. Additionally, it contains 40% SiO_{2}, 25% MgO, 2% unburned coal (which will serve as fuel in the subsequent electric furnace fusion stage), and 1% Al_{2}O_{3}.) This calcine can be obtained using other furnaces, but at the beginning of the 21st century, "static furnace processes have been tried, with limited success. Most ferronickel producers invest in rotary furnaces. In 2011, only one producer installs static shaft furnaces".

The calcine is then melted in electric furnaces 15 to 20 m in diameter, producing 100 to 200 tonnes of ferronickel per day. (Note: These electric melting furnaces are fed by three large graphite electrodes (or 6 when the furnace is rectangular), each measuring 1.5 m in diameter and 25 m long. Each electrode carries about 30,000 A, with the furnace power ranging from 40 to 80 MW.) This melting stage allows the separation, by decantation, of oxides (which form slag) from molten iron and nickel. Melting, which occurs at 1500 °C, is very energy-intensive. Furthermore, the reduction of iron and nickel oxides by carbon, provided by the graphite electrodes or contained in the powder, is highly endothermic: furnaces typically consume 500 kWh per tonne of charged powder. However, in the molten metal, no reduction reaction affects the other oxides, which form the slag. (Note: The composition of electric furnace slag is typically: 40 to 55% SiO_{2}, 20 to 30% MgO, 5 to 20% FeO (efforts are made to maximize the iron content of the slag by adjusting the amount of carbon available for reduction), 1 to 7% CaO, 1 to 2% Al_{2}O_{3}, and less than 0.2% nickel (the molten metal contains 90 to 98% of the charged nickel). Slag production is significant: a large electric furnace processes 4,000 tonnes of calcined powder daily into 250 tonnes of raw ferronickel and 3,700 tonnes of slag.) The metal separates easily because, in addition to its much lower density, it is an ionic compound, not miscible with the molten metal. At this stage, raw or unrefined ferronickel is recovered from the electric furnace.

Since the electric furnace reduces iron and nickel, it cannot remove sulfur and phosphorus, undesirable elements present in ferronickel at 0.4% and 0.06%, respectively. As in steel production, these elements are typically removed by oxidation. Moreover, the elimination of their oxides requires a basic medium, rich in lime and poor in silica, to form CaS and (CaO)_{4}P_{2}O_{5}, which then float in lime-rich slag. Desulfurization and dephosphorization are therefore carried out in a separate ladle metallurgy workshop, where much less powerful electric ladle furnaces ensure the stirring of the molten metal.

It is also possible to add sulfur in the direct reduction rotary kiln. This results in a sulfide matte (63% iron, 28% nickel, 10% sulfur) at the exit of the electric furnace, which is then refined in a Peirce-Smith converter. Blowing, limited to the first stage of the Manhès-David process, (Note: There is also the process of the company "Le Nickel": instead of adding sulfur in the direct reduction rotary kiln, it is injected later, in the Peirce-Smith converter, when it blows the molten ferronickel.) removes all iron from the matte. (Note: Iron is thus evacuated as oxide in the slag, typically composed of 25% SiO_{2}, 53% FeO, and less than 0.6% nickel.) The "white matte" that comes out (78% nickel and 20% sulfur) is solidified, crushed, and roasted twice (an oxidizing roast to remove sulfur, then a reducing roast to remove oxygen introduced by the first roast) to produce pure nickel. It is also possible to purify this white matte by electrolysis, or to make nickel salts through hydrometallurgical processes. Resulfurization of nickel concerns approximately 10% of lateritic ore treatment, or less than 4% of nickel production from ores.

==== Limonite and smectite ====
Limonite and smectite are too rich in iron to be economically treated by pyrometallurgical processes. However, their low magnesia content facilitates their treatment by hydrometallurgy. Indeed, it is important to minimize sulfuric acid consumption, which combines with magnesia, a base.

The concentrated ores from limonite and smectite are therefore leached with sulfuric acid. The reaction takes place in an autoclave 4.5 m in diameter and 30 m long, capable of treating 2,000 tonnes of concentrates per day. This process, called "HPAL process" for High-pressure Acid-Leaching process, is conducted at 250 °C and 40 bar. It removes more than 95% of nickel and cobalt and consists of:

- precipitating iron, which arrived as goethite, by transforming it into hematite. This is discharged with the mud, containing 51% iron by weight;
- transforming nickel(II) hydroxide Ni(OH)_{2} into soluble nickel(II) sulfate NiSO_{4}. This solution contains 95% of the nickel and cobalt from the concentrated ore.

The acidic liquid rich in nickel (6 g/L nickel, 0.5 g/L cobalt, 30 to 50 g/L H_{2}SO_{4}), is then purified of impurities (aluminium, chromium, copper, etc.) by neutralization. Finally, a new treatment with sulfuric acid at lower temperature and pressure allows the precipitation of nickel sulfate NiSO_{4} as a compound based on nickel sulfide NiS (composition: 55% nickel, 5% cobalt, 40% sulfur).

==== Sulfide ores ====
The nickel concentrates (10 to 20% nickel, mainly pentlandite) produced by froth flotation of sulfide ores are treated by pyrometallurgy. Indeed, sulfide ores like pentlandite generally contain appreciable amounts of precious metals (gold, silver, platinum, etc.), which are difficult to recover by hydrometallurgical processes. The concentrates can be melted in two ways: flash smelting or the electric arc furnace. In both cases, a slag, which is discarded, and a nickel matte, both at 1450 °C, are obtained. In 2009, a quarter of nickel sulfides are melted in an electric furnace. Before melting in the electric furnace, the concentrated ore is roasted in a fluidized bed reactor (typical characteristics: 5 m in diameter, 6 m high, production of 50 t/h) at a temperature between 600 and 760 °C. This roasting is oxidizing: part of the sulfur leaves as gaseous SO_{2}, further enriching the concentrate in nickel. The hot and dry calcine (about 300 °C) is then fed into the electric furnace, generally rectangular and heated by 6 electrodes. The fusibility of the slag is improved by adding siliceous flux. Like in ferronickel production, the fusion-reduction in the furnace consumes about 500 kWh per tonne of charged calcine. Similarly, carbon is added to the bath to produce CO, maintaining a reducing environment for NiO. However, unlike ferronickel production, it is sulfur, present as iron(II) sulfide FeS, that performs most of the reduction of nickel oxide NiO, which becomes nickel sulfide NiS. The matte from the electric furnace contains about 30% nickel.

The alternative process is flash smelting, which treats three-quarters of nickel sulfides (Note: In 2011, there are 9 flash smelting furnaces worldwide: 7 Outotec type furnaces (U-shaped) accounting for 70% of nickel flash smelting, and 2 Inco type furnaces (inverted T-shaped) accounting for the remaining 30%.) It performs roasting and smelting operations in the same reactor. Indeed:

- flash smelting is oxidizing (while electric furnace smelting is reducing), allowing part of the sulfur to be evacuated as gaseous SO_{2}, and part of the iron as FeO, an oxide that goes with the slag;
- prior roasting before electric furnace smelting, which is an oxidation operation of the concentrated ore, is not necessary. Moreover, since this roasting is exothermic, it aids smelting.

A flash smelting furnace typically measures 25 m long and 8 m wide. Such a furnace continuously produces between 1,000 and 2,000 tonnes of molten matte per day, containing about 40% nickel.

The matte, which collects 98% of the nickel from the calcine or concentrate, separates easily from the slag, although the slag from flash smelting often contains an appreciable amount of oxidized nickel, sometimes leading to its recovery in a dedicated electric furnace. The matte is then refined in a Peirce-Smith converter, following the Manhès-David process (a process derived from the Bessemer process), which is stopped when all iron is oxidized and has passed into the slag. The refined matte (sometimes called white matte or converter matte) then contains 40 to 70% nickel, sulfur, and metals not oxidized by the converter (copper, gold, silver, and platinum group metals).

The slag from the converter is almost systematically sent to an electric furnace that keeps it molten to settle all the metal droplets it contains. Indeed, the significant agitation of the bath in the converter does not allow perfect separation between slag and matte.

Nearly half of the nickel mattes from sulfide ores are slowly cooled (three days at 500 °C then one day at 200 °C). This allows the average grain size to increase from 10 to 100 μm. Then, grinding the metal to this particle size prepares the separation of Cu_{2}S, Ni_{3}S_{2}, and Ni-Cu. A first magnetic separation removes the Ni-Cu metallic alloy (65% nickel, 17% copper, and precious metals) from the sulfides. Then, these sulfides are treated by leaching in a basic solution (pH 12), with Cu_{2}S floating while Ni_{3}S_{2} sinks to the bottom.

=== Final refining ===
Four main final refining methods can be distinguished:

- oxidizing then reducing roasting;
- hydrometallurgical treatment;
- carbonylation of nickel, or Mond process;
- electrolysis.

==== Roasting of the matte ====
Roasting concerns the converter matte (or "white matte") produced by sulfur injection in the treatment of saprolites. This process belongs to a rather marginal metallurgical route. The converter matte (78% nickel and 20% sulfur) is solidified, crushed, and roasted twice: an oxidizing roast to remove sulfur, then a reducing roast to remove oxygen introduced by the first roast. The result is pure nickel.

==== Hydrometallurgy of nickel sulfides ====
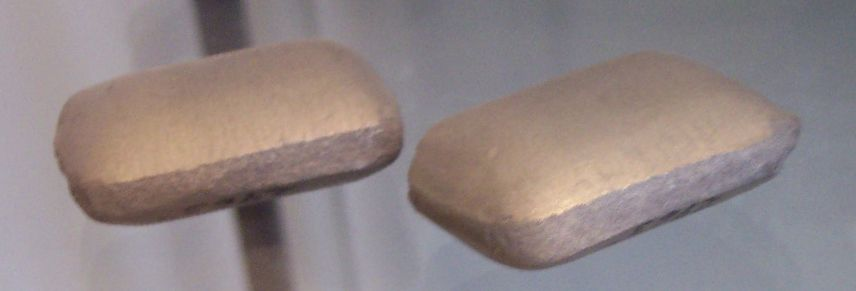
Briquettes of nickel sintered at 950 °C after reduction by hydrogen. Their purity is about 99.8%.

A final hydrometallurgical step can treat both the matte from the Peirce-Smith converter and the sulfides from the treatment of iron-rich laterites (limonite and smectite). The processes are numerous and complex, both due to patents and the diversity of ores. Indeed, because of the richness in nickel of the products, the quantities to be treated are limited: complexity does not significantly affect profitability. But it is essential to recover all metals without waste. Hydrometallurgical refining consists successively of:

- leaching, which can be done using three different chemistries: either chlorine gas in a chlorinated solution (usually followed by electrolysis), or oxygen in ammonia (the Sherritt process, consisting of precipitating a nickel methenamine sulfate (2Ni(NH_{3})_{6}SO_{4})), or oxygen in sulfuric acid;
- purifying the solution to remove precipitates of cobalt and copper. This is done by crystallization or by liquid-liquid extraction;
- reduction by hydrogen to give a sintered nickel powder in briquettes, or electrolysis.

Nickel sulfides from laterite treatment have a composition of 55% nickel, 5% cobalt, and 35% sulfur. They are easier to treat than those from sulfide ores, which contain copper.

==== Carbonylation ====
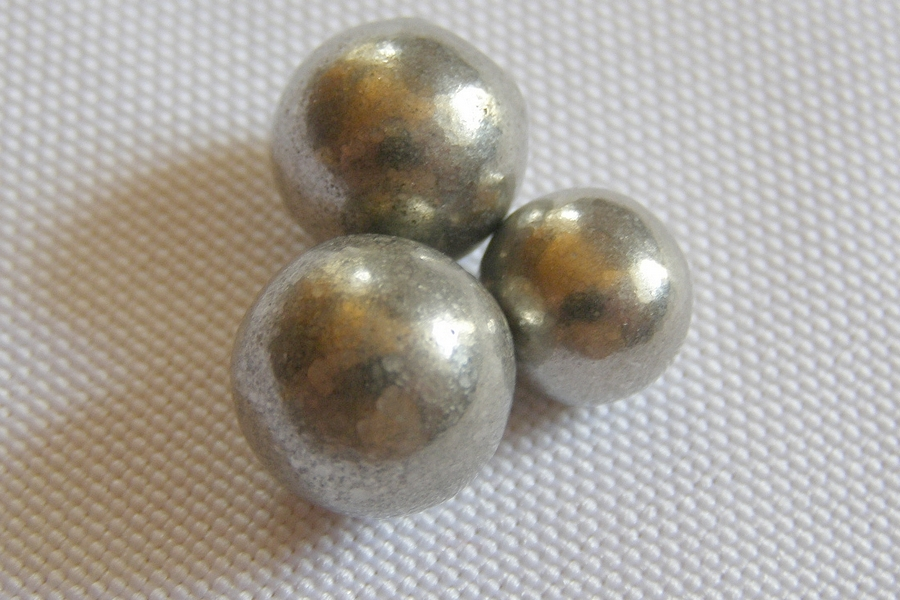
Nickel pellets from the Mond process.

The carbonylation of nickel, or Mond process, is a refining method capable of efficiently extracting nickel from metal alloys low in iron. Among metals, nickel has the characteristic of forming nickel tetracarbonyl Ni(CO)_{4} gas at 50 °C in the presence of carbon monoxide, which, when heated to 220–250 °C, decomposes back into pure metallic nickel and carbon monoxide. The decomposition of nickel tetracarbonyl is typically done by passing the gas through a bed of nickel pellets heated to 240 °C. Since iron can also form iron pentacarbonyl under the process conditions, the iron content in the metal to be refined is minimized, which is why the Mond process is applied to converter mattes freed of iron by the Manhès-David process. In 2009, this process concerns a little less than 300,000 tonnes per year of nickel out of the 1,500,000 tonnes of primary nickel produced worldwide.

==== Electrolysis ====
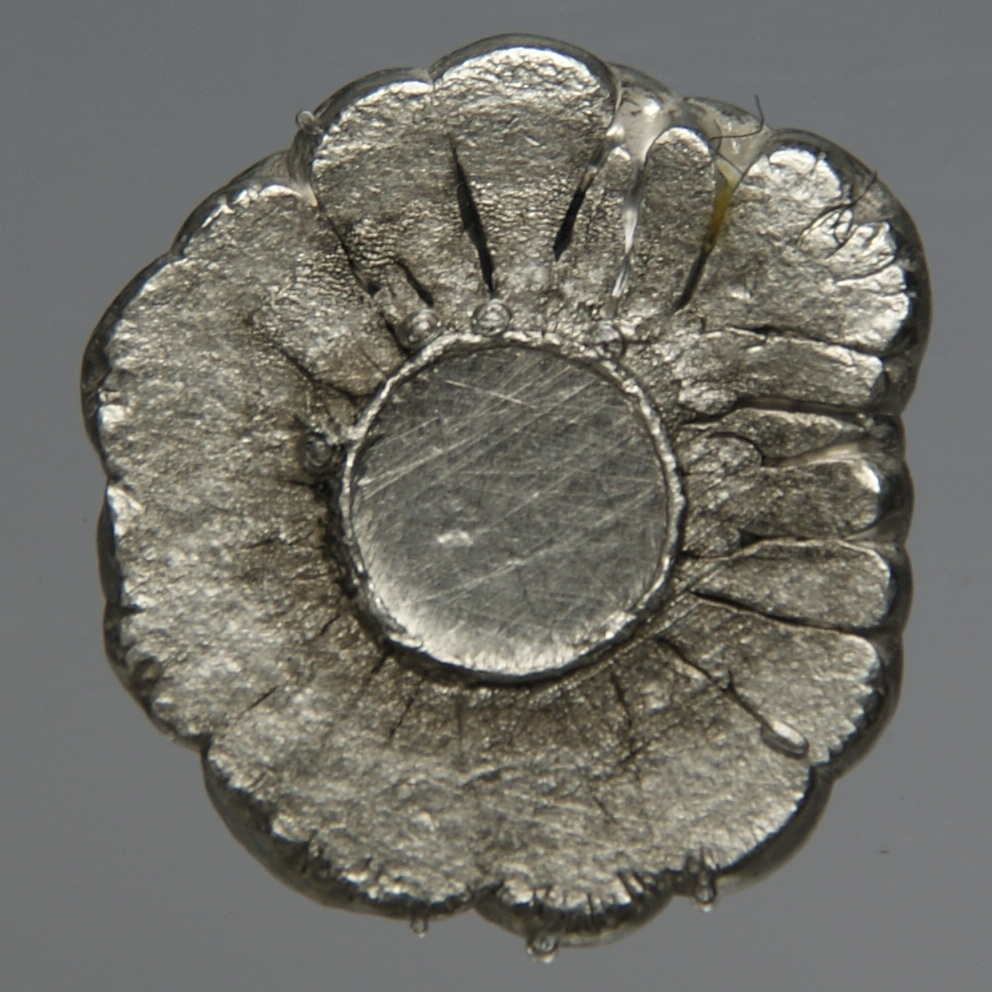
Metallographic section showing nickel accretion around the cathode.

Nickel can be refined by electrolysis. It accumulates on the cathode, while oxygen escapes at the anode, with the electrolyte being a mixture of nickel sulfide and sulfuric acid. Cathodes are harvested after about 7 days.

In 2009, approximately 200,000 tonnes per year of nickel with a purity of 99.9%, out of the 1,500,000 tonnes of primary nickel produced worldwide, are refined by electrolysis.

== Economic aspects ==
=== Industrial characteristics ===
Like all mining industries, it is essential to accurately assess the size of the deposit since the facilities will be useless once it is depleted. In 2004, an extraction project must have a minimum capacity of 40,000 tonnes per year for 20 years.

The investment costs related to the commissioning of a nickel mine depend heavily on the type of exploitation (open-pit mines are significantly less expensive than underground mines). Of course, the richness of the ore allows for a considerable reduction in the investment cost of both the mine and the associated plant. The enrichment level of a lateritic ore should not exceed three. In practice, industries abandon ores requiring an enrichment level greater than two.

At the beginning of the 21st century, some projects allow estimating the construction cost of a plant producing 60,000 tonnes per year of ferronickel from laterite at approximately 4 billion dollars (Koniambo, New Caledonia). This represents an investment of 70,000 dollars per tonne of nickel produced annually. The minimum capacity for a profitable ferronickel plant is estimated at 60,000 tonnes per year. For a plant producing pure nickel, the costs are similar.

In 2010, the tonne of nickel traded as ferronickel is quoted at 26,000 dollars. The cost of transforming ore into ferronickel at the same time is between 4,000 and 6,000 dollars for an efficient plant: capital amortization explains much of the difference between selling price and production cost.

Like many metallurgical processes, energy consumption is a key factor in profitability. The use of coal instead of hydrocarbons, electricity generation from dams are some of the most common methods to reduce energy costs.

=== Economic importance ===
For the few countries with nickel deposits, extraction can be a key element of their economy. In the 2010s, nickel mines and metallurgy represent 80% of the value of New Caledonia's exports, although only 45% of the extracted ore is processed locally. At the same time, nickel is the third source of export revenue for Cuba, after tourism and sugar.

== Current and future developments ==
The extraction of nickel from laterite, which began in the early 20th century in New Caledonia, quickly became minor compared to extraction from sulfide ores, which started shortly after in Sudbury. However, given current projects, production from sulfide ores is expected to stagnate, while production from laterites is expected to account for most of the growth.

A current research axis concerns the development of "omnivorous" processes, compatible with both saprolite and smectite, i.e., capable of treating nickel laterite deposits without having to separate these two ores.

Ore enrichment is essential for profitability. But "all lateritic deposits are different. For this reason, all ores must be carefully tested to determine how far they can be enriched". Thus, some companies, such as Le Nickel, strongly defend the interest of enrichment while remaining very discreet about the details of their processes.

It is also worth noting the revival, from 2005, of the production of nickel pig iron, a ferronickel containing 4 to 13% nickel when produced in a blast furnace, and 8 to 15% nickel when produced in an electric furnace. In 2010, this cheap substitute for ferronickel produced in China represents 10% of the nickel extraction market. That year, one-third is from small blast furnaces (the rest from electric furnaces), using laterites from Indonesia and the Philippines. This Chinese innovation is closely studied by industrialists. However, in January 2014, Indonesia's ban on nickel ore exports threatens this sector, which sources half of its supply from that country, pushing some producers to build blast furnaces on the extraction site itself, in Indonesia

== See also ==
- Pentlandite
- Garnierite
- Speiss
- Matte (metallurgy)
- Leaching (metallurgy)
- Flotation
- Electric arc furnace
- Manhès-David process
- Electrolysis
- Krupp-Renn process
- Mond process

== Sources ==
- Krundwell, Frank K.; Moats, Michael S.; Ramachandran, Venkoba; Robinson, Timothy G.; Davenport, William G. (2011). Extractive Metallurgy of Nickel, Cobalt and Platinum Group Metals. Elsevier. ISBN 978-0-08-096809-4.
