= Nickel Asia Corporation =

Philippine mining company

- Type: Public
- Traded as: PSE: NIKL
- Industry: Mining and Oil
- Founded: 1969
- Headquarters: NAC Tower, 32nd Street, Bonifacio Global City, Taguig, Metro Manila
- Key people: Gerard Brimo (Chairman & CEO); Philip T. Ang (Vice Chairman); Martin Antonio G. Zamora President; Jose B. Anievas (SVP, COO & CRO); Manuel B. Zamora Jr. (Chairman Emeritus)
- Website: www.nickelasia.com

Nickel Asia Corporation (NAC) is a Philippine mining company based at the Bonifacio Global City in Taguig, Metro Manila which primarily mines lateritic nickel ore.

== Mining ==
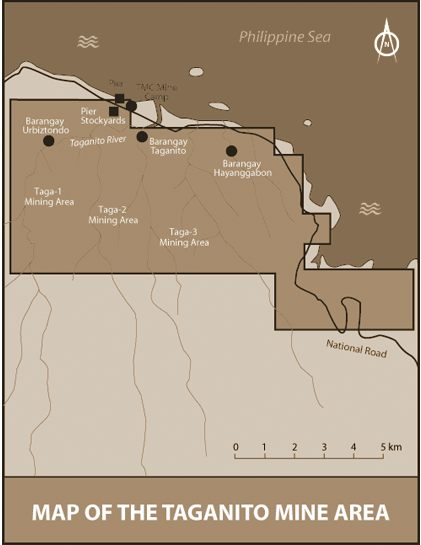
Taganito Mining Area. Claver, Surigao del Norte

Founded in 1969 by Manuel “Manny” B. Zamora Jr, brother of businessman Salvador “Buddy” B. Zamora and former San Juan City Congressman Ronaldo “Ronnie” B. Zamora of the Zamora family, it currently has four operational mining sites:

- The Rio Tuba mine near Bataraza town, Palawan, operated by Rio Tuba Nickel Mining Corporation (RTNMC, oldest, opened in 1969, shipped nickel internationally in 1970)
- The Taganito Mine in Claver, Surigao del Norte operated by Taganito Mining Corporation
  - The Taganito HPAL Nickel Plant is situated on the coastline ~ 10 km to east of Claver at the Taganito river estuary.9.5407°N 125.8134°E
- The Hinatuan Mine (Tagana-an Nickel Project) is located on Hinatuan Island, Tagana-an, Surigao del Norte and operated by Hinatuan Mining Corporation.
- The Cagdianao Mine, with the Valencia Pit and adjacent Boa Pit in Cagdianao, Dinagat covers 249.48 square kilometers, was acquired in 1998 and is operated by the Cagdianao Mining Corporation.

Formerly Cagdianao operated the South Dingagat Mine, which was closed in October 2007 due to substantial depletion of the higher grade saprolite ore reserves. It has since reopened since 2021. They also operated the Manicani Mine, Manicani Island, Guiuan, Eastern Samar, from 1992 to 1994, and briefly again in 2001, and 2014 to 2016. But the Manicani Mine closed for good in 2016.

The main products, saprolite and limonite ore, are used by NAC's Japanese, Chinese and Australian customers to produce ferronickel and nickel pig iron (NPI).

NAC's sites were among those under critical inspection of the DENR (Department of Environment and Natural Resources), accused of a range of environmental law violations with uncontrolled siltation and soil erosion, dust emissions cited as the main reasons amongst others. The Hinatuan site was one of 20 mining sites subsequently proposed for close-down in September 2016. In February 2017, the late Environment Secretary Gina Lopez ordered the closure of the Hinatuan Mine. The mine has since reopened after her appointment was turned down by the Commission on Appointments.

== Other ventures ==
Besides the mining business, NAC also has invested in renewable energy and power generation with Emerging Power Inc (established in 2001), (EPI), operating in Subic Bay Freeport, Nauhan, Mindoro Oriental, and Biliran. NAC has also ventured into gold and copper exploration with subsidiaries, Cordillera Exploration Co Inc, and Newminco Pacific Mining Corp.They have also ventured into the copper industry. MRC Allied Inc on March 11, 2022, sold 100% of their stakes in Tampakan Copper-Gold Project and Marihatag Copper-Gold Project in Tampakan, Davao Del Sur, and the Boston-Cateel Copper-Gold Project and Paquibato Copper-Gold Project in Davao Oriental and Davao Del Norte to Salvador “Buddy” Zamora, former campaign manager of Manny Pacquiao during the 2022 Philippine elections.

Aside from Nickel Asia Corporation, the Zamora family also owns or has interests in the following industries: Security Bank (Banking; purchased from Rolando Gapud in 1986), MANTA Equities Inc (Real estate firm established in 1990), Informatics Philippines (Part of the Informatics Group in Singapore; College established in 1993), Philippine International Air Terminal Co. (Aviation), St Luke’s Medical Center (Healthcare, established in 1903), Zamora and Poblador law (Law firm established in 1993), Cafe Lyon/Dome Cafe (Food and beverage; franchised in 1993) YUKI (Food and beverage; franchised 2019), and Pepper Lunch (Food and beverage; franchised in 2008), Tranzen Group (Holding company established in 2008), MRC Allied (Holding company established in 1990), 5G Security Inc, Philippine Phosphate Fertilizer Corporation, Bacavalley Energy, Inc., One Pacstar Realty Corporation, Two Pactstar Realty Corporation, Agusan Power Corporation, Philphos Trading Inc., Lear Aero Ltd., Inc., Libjo Mining Corporation, and Lake Mainit Hydro Holdings Corporation, and PT&T (Broadband established in 1962)

Besides their business ventures, the Zamora family are also active in politics: Mayor Francis Zamora and Congresswoman Ysabel Zamora are currently serving as Mayor and Congresswoman of San Juan city respectively. While the sister of the Mayor and Congresswoman, is former Congresswoman Amparo Maria Zamora who was the representative for the second district of Taguig City.

== See also ==
- Nickel mining
- Laterite
