= Carrollite =

Mineral

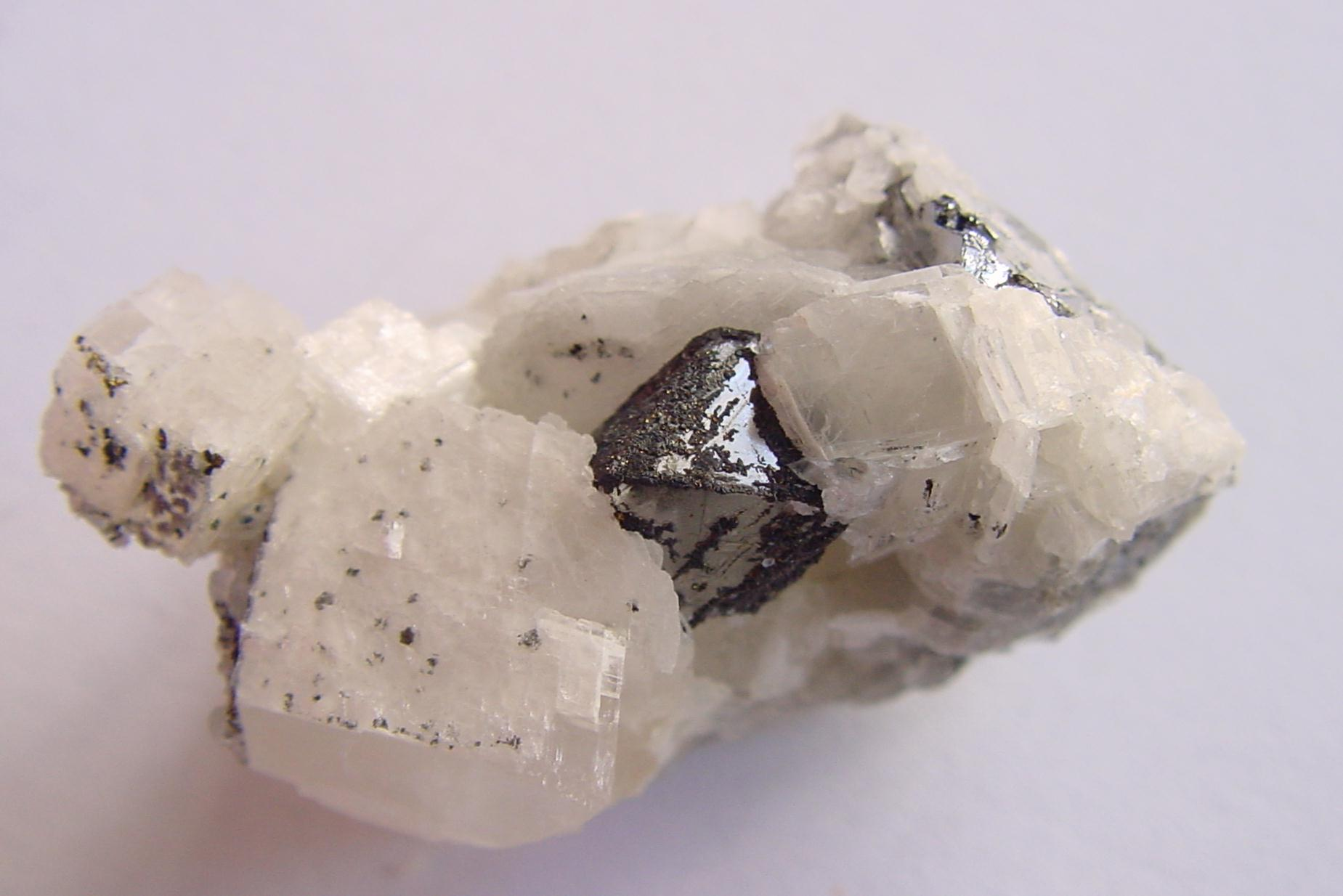
- Carrollite from Kambove, Katanga. This specimen is 4.3 cm wide, with a 1.2 cm carrollite crystal partly covered by pyrite, between calcite crystals.

General
- Category: Sulfide mineral Thiospinel group (Spinel structural group)
- Formula: CuCo_{2}S_{4}
- IMA symbol: Cli
- Strunz classification: 2.DA.05
- Dana classification: 2.10.1.2
- Crystal system: Isometric
- Crystal class: Hexoctahedral (m3̅m); H-M symbol: (4/m 3̅ 2/m)
- Space group: Fd3̅m

Identification
- Color: Light to dark gray, rarely tarnishes to copper red or violet gray
- Crystal habit: Octahedral and cubic crystals, also massive, granular or compact
- Twinning: {111} Polysynthetic or spinel twins
- Cleavage: Imperfect on {001}
- Fracture: Conchoidal, subconchoidal or uneven
- Tenacity: Very brittle
- Mohs scale hardness: 4.5 to 5.5
- Luster: Metallic
- Streak: Grey black
- Diaphaneity: Opaque. R is 43% to 45% for lambda = 560 nm
- Specific gravity: 4.5 to 4.8 measured, 4.83 calculated
- Refractive index: n is not determined for an opaque mineral
- Solubility: Minerals of the linneite group are partly etched by nitric acid, with slight effervescence.
- Other characteristics: Not radioactive, not fluorescent

Carrollite, CuCo_{2}S_{4}, is a sulfide of copper and cobalt, often with substantial substitution of nickel for the metal ions, and a member of the linnaeite group. It is named after the type locality in Carroll County, Maryland, US, at the Patapsco mine, Sykesville.

== Unit cell ==
Space group: Fd3m. Unit cell parameters = a = 9.48 Å, Z = 8. Unit cell volume: V = 851.97 Å^{3} (calculated from unit cell parameters).

== Linnaeite group ==
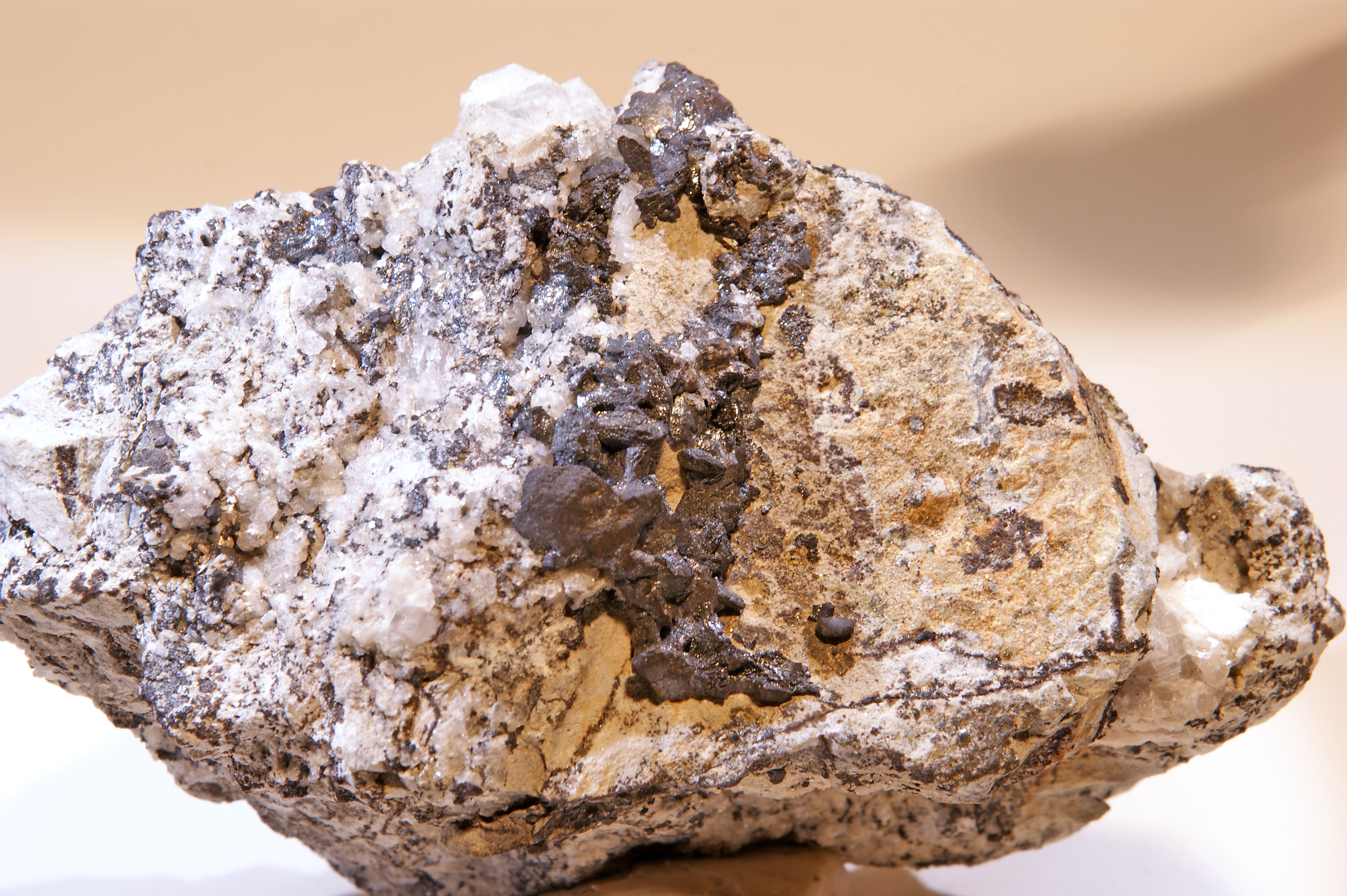
Carrollite from Katanga, specimen 11 × 6 cm

The linnaeite group is a group of sulfides and selenides with the general formula AB_{2}X_{4} in which X is sulfur or selenium, A is divalent Fe, Ni, Co or Cu and B is trivalent Co, Ni or, for daubréelite, Cr. The minerals are isometric, space group Fd3m and isostructural with each other and with minerals of the spinel group.

The structure of the linnaeite group consists of a cubic close packed array of X (X is oxygen in the spinels and sulfur or selenium in the linnaeite group). Within the array of Xs there are two types of interstices, one type tetrahedrally co-ordinated and one type octahedrally co-ordinated. One eighth of the tetrahedral sites A are typically occupied by 2^{+} cations, and half of the octahedral sites B by 3^{+} cations. Charnock et al. confirmed that carrollite contains Cu wholly within the tetrahedral sites. Thus, the ideal formula one would expect for a spinel like carrollite is Cu^{2+}Co^{3+}_{2}S^{2−}_{4}, but as in the case of copper sulfides in general the oxidation state of the copper atom is 1+, not 2+. An assignment of valences as Cu^{+}Co^{3+}_{2}S^{1.75−}_{4} is more appropriate; this was confirmed in a study of 2009. The one missing electron per four sulfur atoms is delocalized, leading to metallic conductivity and even superconductivity at very low temperatures, combined with a complicated magnetic behavior.

== Solid solutions ==
A solid solution results when one cation can substitute for another across an appreciable composition range. In carrollite Co^{2+} can substitute for Cu^{+} at the A sites, and when the substitution is complete the mineral formed is called linnaeite, Co^{2+}Co^{3+}_{2}S_{4}. This means that there is a solid solution series between carrollite and linnaeite. Also, Ni substitutes for both Co and Cu in the carrollite structure, giving a solid solution from carrollite to cuprian siegenite. Siegenite, Co^{2+}Ni^{3+}_{2}S_{4}, is itself a member of the solid solution series between linnaeite and polydymite, Ni^{2+}Ni^{3+}_{2}S_{4}. (Wagner and Cook found no evidence for solid solution between carrollite and fletcherite, CuNi_{2}S_{4}).

== Environment ==
Carrollite occurs in hydrothermal vein deposits associated with tetrahedrite, chalcopyrite, bornite, digenite, djurleite, chalcocite, pyrrhotite, pyrite, sphalerite, millerite, gersdorffite, ullmannite, cobaltoan calcite, and with linnaeite group members linnaeite, siegenite and polydymite.

Phase relations in the Cu-Co-S system have been investigated. At temperatures around 900 °C a chalcocite-digenite solid solution coexists with cobalt sulfides. With decreasing temperature, at 880 °C a carrollite-linnaeite solid solution develops, becoming more copper-rich on cooling, with the carrollite composition at about 500 °C. Below 507 °C covellite is stable and coexists with copper-bearing cattierite. Low chalcocite appears at 103 °C, djurleite appears at 93 °C, and digenite disappears and anilite appears around 70 °C. There is some evidence for supergene replacement of an intermediate member of the linnaeite-carrollite series by djurleite.

== Distribution ==
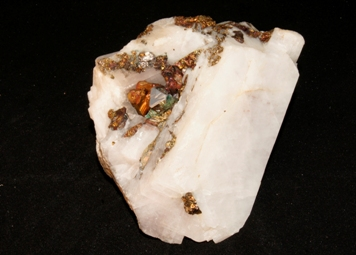
Carrollite and native copper on calcite

Carrollite is found worldwide; reported in Australia, Austria, Azerbaijan, Brazil, Bulgaria, Canada, Chile, China, the Czech Republic, the Democratic Republic of Congo, France, Germany, Japan, Morocco, Namibia, North Korea, Norway, Oman, Poland, Romania, Russia, Slovakia, Sweden, Switzerland, US and Zambia.
