= Cobalt sulfide =

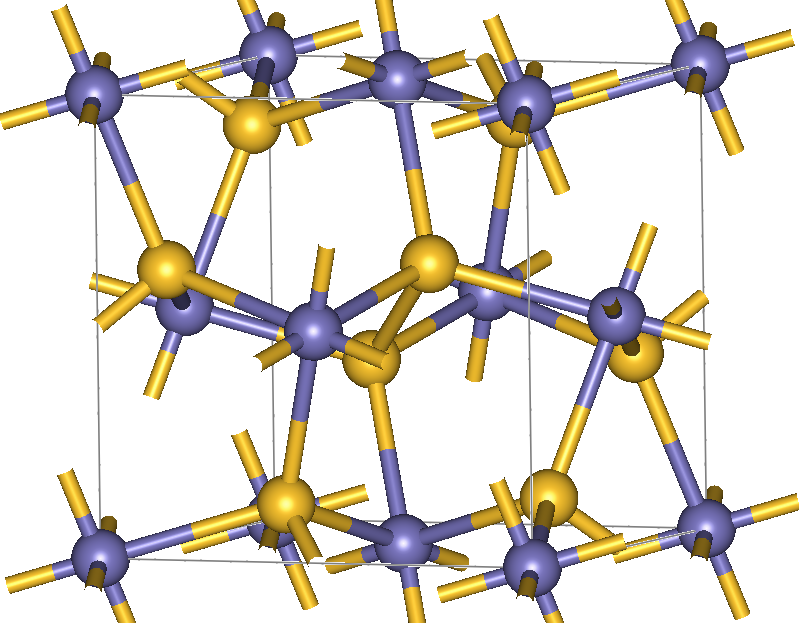

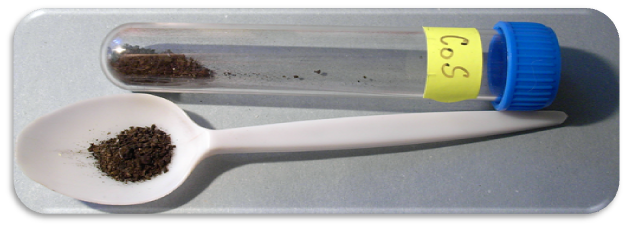

Identifiers
CAS Number	CoS: 1317-42-6
3D model (JSmol)	CoS: Interactive image
ChemSpider	CoS: 140220
EC Number	CoS: 215-273-3
PubChem CID	CoS: 14832
RTECS number	CoS: GG332500
UNII	CoS: INZ5E36Y1V
- InChI: InChI=1S/Co.S Key: VRRFSFYSLSPWQY-UHFFFAOYSA-N
- SMILES: CoS: S=[Co]

Properties
Chemical formula	Co_{x}S_{y}
Molar mass	90.9982 g/mol
Appearance	black solid (alpha) grayish-red crystals (beta)
Density	5.45 g/cm^{3}
Melting point	1195 °C
Solubility in water	0.00038 g/100 mL (18 °C)
Solubility	slightly soluble in acid
Magnetic susceptibility (χ)	+225.0·10^{−6} cm^{3}/mol

Structure
Crystal structure	octahedral (beta)

Hazards
- GHS labelling
Pictograms	(GHS07: Exclamation mark) (GHS09: Environmental hazard)
Signal word	Warning
Hazard statements	H317, H410
Precautionary statements	P261, P272, P273, P280, P302+P352, P321, P333+P317, P362+P364, P391, P501
- Except where otherwise noted, data are given for materials in their standard state (at 25 °C [77 °F], 100 kPa). verify (what is ?) Infobox references

Cobalt sulfide is the name for chemical compounds with a formula Co_{x}S_{y}. Well-characterized species include minerals with the formulas CoS, CoS_{2}, Co_{3}S_{4}, and Co_{9}S_{8}. In general, the sulfides of cobalt are black, semiconducting, insoluble in water, and nonstoichiometric. Cobalt sulfides can be prepared in the laboratory by treating an aqueous solution of cobalt(II) nitrate with hydrogen sulfide according to the following idealized equation:

Co(NO_{3})_{2} + H_{2}S → CoS + 2HNO_{3}

== Minerals and hydrometallurgy ==
Cobalt sulfides occur widely as minerals, comprising major sources of all cobalt compounds. Binary cobalt sulfide minerals include the cattierite (CoS_{2}) and linnaeite (Co_{3}S_{4}). CoS_{2} (see image in table) is isostructural with iron pyrite, featuring disulfide groups, i.e. Co^{2+}S_{2}^{2−}. Linnaeite, also rare, adopts the spinel motif. The Co_{9}S_{8} compound is known as a very rare cobaltpentlandite (the Co analogue of pentlandite). Mixed metal sulfide minerals include carrollite (CuCo_{2}S_{4}) and siegenite (Co_{3−x}Ni_{x}S_{4}).

CoS is known as jaipurite. However, this species is questionable.

Cobalt sulfide minerals are converted to cobalt via roasting and extraction into aqueous acid. In some processes, cobalt salts are purified by precipitation when aqueous solutions of cobalt(II) ions are treated with hydrogen sulfide. Not only is this reaction useful in the purification of cobalt from its ores, but also in qualitative inorganic analysis.

== Applications and research ==
In combination with molybdenum, the sulfides of cobalt are used as catalysts for the industrial process called hydrodesulfurization, which is implemented on a large scale in refineries. Synthetic cobalt sulfides are widely investigated as electrocatalysts.

== Selected literature ==
- Congiu, M.; Albano, L. G. S.; Decker, F.; Graeff, C. F. O. (2015-01-01). "Single precursor route to efficient cobalt sulphide counter electrodes for Dye-sensitized solar cells". Electrochimica Acta. 151: 517–524. doi:10.1016/j.electacta.2014.11.001.
- Huo, Jinghao; Zheng, Min; Tu, Yongguang; Wu, Jihuai; Hu, Linhua; Dai, Songyuan (2015-03-20). "A high performance cobalt sulfide counter electrode for dye-sensitized solar cells". Electrochimica Acta. 159: 166–173. doi:10.1016/j.electacta.2015.01.214.
- Congiu, M.; Albano, L. G. S.; Decker, F.; Graeff, C. F. O. (2015-01-01). "Single precursor route to efficient cobalt sulphide counter electrodes for dye sensitized solar cells". Electrochimica Acta. 151: 517–524. doi:10.1016/j.electacta.2014.11.001.
- Congiu, Mirko; Lanuti, Alessandro; di Carlo, Aldo; Graeff, Carlos F. O. (2015-12-01). "A novel and large area suitable water-based ink for the deposition of cobalt sulfide films for solar energy conversion with iodine-free electrolytes". Solar Energy. 122: 87–96. Bibcode:2015SoEn..122...87C. doi:10.1016/j.solener.2015.08.032. hdl:11449/177482.
- Lin, Jeng-Yu; Liao, Jen-Hung; Wei, Tzu-Chien (2011-04-01). "Honeycomb-like CoS Counter Electrodes for Transparent Dye-Sensitized Solar Cells". Electrochemical and Solid-State Letters. 14 (4): D41–D44. doi:10.1149/1.3533917. ISSN 1099-0062.
- Lin, Jeng-Yu; Liao, Jen-Hung; Chou, Shu-Wei (2011-10-01). "Cathodic electrodeposition of highly porous cobalt sulfide counter electrodes for dye-sensitized solar cells". Electrochimica Acta. 56 (24): 8818–8826. doi:10.1016/j.electacta.2011.07.080.
- Congiu, Mirko; Bonomo, Matteo; Marco, Maria Letizia De; Dowling, Denis P.; Di Carlo, Aldo; Dini, Danilo; Graeff, Carlos F. O. (2016-07-16). "Cobalt Sulfide as Counter Electrode in p-Type Dye-Sensitized Solar Cells". ChemistrySelect. 1 (11): 2808–2815. doi:10.1002/slct.201600297. ISSN 2365-6549.
- Nattestad, Andrew; Ferguson, Michael; Kerr, Robert; Cheng, Yi-Bing; Bach, Udo (2008). "Dye-sensitized nickel(II)oxide photocathodes for tandem solar cell applications". Nanotechnology. 19 (29) 295304. Bibcode:2008Nanot..19C5304N. doi:10.1088/0957-4484/19/29/295304. PMID 21730603. S2CID 30601690.
