= List of exports of Albania =

Exports of Albania by product category (2019) Chemical products Transportation Machines Mineral products Plastics and rubbers Metals Foodstuffs Precious metals Textiles Instruments Animal products Vegetable products Paper goods Footwear and headwear Miscellaneous Stone and glass Wood products Animal and vegetable bi-products Animal hides Arts and antiques Weapons

The following is a list of the exports of Albania.

Data is for 2012, in millions of United States dollars, as reported by The Observatory of Economic Complexity. The top ten exports are listed.

#	Product	Value
1	Crude petroleum	473,075
2	Leather footwear	194,420
3	Footwear parts	111,021
4	Semi-finished iron	70,421
5	Chromium ore	69,274
6	Non-knit men's suits	60,969
7	Ferroalloys	48,872
8	Padlocks	45,976
9	Cement	41,652
10	Copper ore	40,261
