= Pacific Metals =

Japanese metal company

Pacific Metals Co Ltd. is a Japanese company. It is listed on the Nikkei 225. The company manufactures and sells ferronickel products. Through its four subsidiaries and seven associate companies, Pacific Metals engages in the complete production cycle from refining ore, to product creation, to sales, to energy production and waste recycling. In 2015, a comparison of Pacific Metals with three other Asian metal producers yielded evidence of a stable production model with sales for the quarter ended in March 2015 reported at ¥61.23 billion (US$508.17 million) as compared to 2010 sales of ¥58.49 billion. The data represents overall sales, as the electrical segment showed a decrease in sales over the same period of ¥1.36 billion.
