= Thiospinel group =

Group of sulfide minerals

The thiospinel group is a group of sulfide minerals with a general formula AB_{2}X_{4} where A is nominally a +2 metal, B is a +3 metal and X is -2 sulfide or similar anion (selenide or telluride). Thio refers to sulfur and spinel indicates their isometric, spinel-like structure.

As the chalcogens S, Se and Te are less electronegative than oxygen, the bonding in these materials is generally more covalent than in the oxospinels. Some are (magnetic) semiconductors but others display, at times complicated, metallic behavior, often coupled with equally complicated magnetic properties. The assignment of oxidation states is also not always as straightforward as in the more ionic oxocompounds, as is shown in the case of carrollite.

Group members include:

- Cadmoindite – CdIn_{2}S_{4}
- Carrollite – CuCo_{2}S_{4}
- Fletcherite – Cu(Ni,Co)_{2}S_{4}
- Greigite – Fe^{2+}Fe^{3+}_{2}S_{4}
- Indite – FeIn_{2}S_{4}
- Kalininite – ZnCr_{2}S_{4}
- Linnaeite – Co^{2+}Co^{3+}_{2}S_{4}
- Polydymite - Ni^{2+}Ni^{3+}_{2}S_{4}
- Siegenite – (Ni,Co)_{3}S_{4}
- Tyrrellite – Cu(Co,Ni)_{2}Se_{4}
- Violarite – Fe^{2+}Ni^{3+}_{2}S_{4}
