= Ferroaluminum =

Alloy of iron and aluminium

Ferroaluminum (FeAl) is a ferroalloy, consisting of iron and aluminium. The metal usually consists of 40% to 60% aluminium. Applications of ferroaluminum include the deoxidation of steel, hardfacing applications, reducing agent, thermite reactions, AlNiCo magnets, and alloying additions to welding wires and fluxes. The alloy is also known for the ability to manufacture low melting point alloys and its ability to carry out aluminothermic welding. Ferroaluminum does not currently have a CAS Registry Number. The presence of iron in aluminum helps in the decrease of casting defects, improves tensile, yield, hardness, and maintains strength at high temperatures.

The first recorded usage of the word "ferroaluminum" was in 1887. Ferroaluminum can also be nitrided, as the aluminium bonds well with the nitrogen forming a hard case. The aluminum provided in the alloy helps with this process. The majority of the world's ferroaluminum is produced by Australia, China, Russia, the US and Canada, with the cost of electricity being the main factor in the aluminum smelting process.

== Manufacturing process ==
Ferroaluminum is manufactured in an electricity-intensive process that involves three steps. First, aluminium oxide (Al_{2}O_{3}) is obtained through the Bayer process by digestion of bauxite with sodium hydroxide (NaOH) at about 240 °C. Second, the aluminium oxide is subjected to a Hall–Héroult process together with cryolite to obtain aluminium that will then be combined with iron to create the ferroaluminum. Last, after the solidification of the metal, milling and sieving processes are carried out, which obtains the suitable particle size for its applications.

== Chemical composition ==
Chemical Composition of Ferroaluminum
Element	Content
Silicon, Si	maximum of 2%
Aluminum, Al	40% to 60%
Carbon, C	maximum of 0.50%
Sulfur, S	maximum of 0.10%
Phosphorus, P	maximum of 0.10%
Iron, Fe	main constituent

== Physical properties ==
Physical Properties of Ferroaluminum
Properties	Metric	Imperial
Melting Point	1160 °C at 60% Al 1250 °C at 40% Al	2120 °F at 60% Al 2282 °F at 40% Al
