= Indite =

General
- Category: Sulfide mineral Thiospinel group Spinel structural group
- Formula: FeIn_{2}S_{4}
- IMA symbol: Idt
- Strunz classification: 2.DA.05
- Dana classification: 02.10.01.12
- Crystal system: Cubic
- Crystal class: Hexoctahedral (m3̅m); H-M symbol: (4/m 3̅ 2/m)
- Space group: Fd3̅m

Identification
- Color: Black
- Crystal habit: Massive, granular
- Mohs scale hardness: 5
- Luster: Metallic
- Diaphaneity: Opaque
- Specific gravity: 4.67

Indite is an extremely rare indium-iron sulfide mineral, found in Siberia. Its chemical formula is FeIn_{2}S_{4}.

It occurs as replacement of cassiterite in hydrothermal deposits. It is associated with dzhalindite, cassiterite and quartz. It was first described in 1963 for an occurrence in the Dzhalinda tin deposit, Malyi Khingan Range, Khabarovskiy Kray, Far-Eastern Region, Russia.
