= Ferrovanadium =

Alloy of iron and vanadium

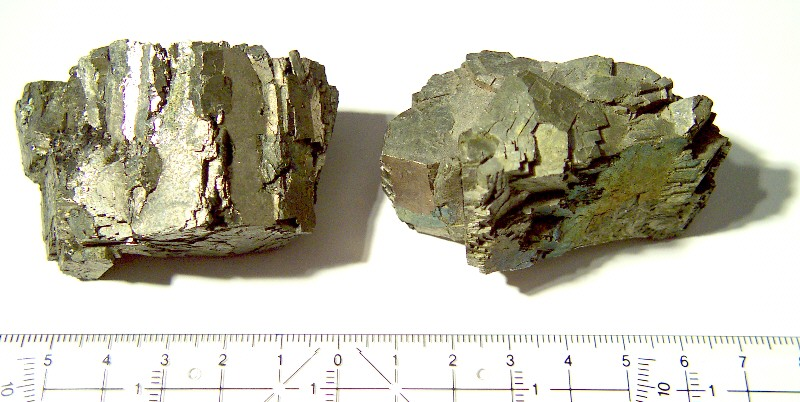

Names
- IUPAC name iron;vanadium

Identifiers
CAS Number	12604-58-9
3D model (JSmol)	Interactive image
ChemSpider	50645136
ECHA InfoCard	100.107.726
EC Number	603-118-6
PubChem CID	14928220
- InChI: InChI=1S/Fe.V Key: PNXOJQQRXBVKEX-UHFFFAOYSA-N
- SMILES: [V].[Fe]

Properties
Chemical formula	FeV
Molar mass	106.786 g/mol
Appearance	grey or silver semi-metallic crystalline solid
Density	Varies by composition
Melting point	1,480 °C (2,700 °F; 1,750 K)
Solubility in water	Insoluble in water

Thermochemistry
Heat capacity (C)	0 J/mol K
Std molar entropy (S^{⦵}_{298})	0 J/mol K
Std enthalpy of formation (Δ_{f}H^{⦵}_{298})	0 kJ/mol

Hazards
- GHS labelling
Pictograms	(GHS07: Exclamation mark) (GHS08: Health hazard)
Signal word	Warning
Hazard statements	H320, H335, H373
Precautionary statements	P260, P264, P271, P304+P340, P305+P351+P338, P312, P314, P337+P313, P403+P233, P405, P501
NFPA 704 (fire diamond)	0 0 0
Flash point	Non-flammable, but dust may be explosive
- Except where otherwise noted, data are given for materials in their standard state (at 25 °C [77 °F], 100 kPa). (what is ?) Infobox references

Ferrovanadium (FeV) is an alloy formed by combining iron and vanadium with a vanadium content range of 35–85%. The production of this alloy results in a grayish silver crystalline solid that can be crushed into a powder called "ferrovanadium dust". Ferrovanadium is a universal hardener, strengthener and anti-corrosive additive for steels like high-strength low-alloy steel, tool steels, as well as other ferrous-based products. It has significant advantages over both iron and vanadium individually. Ferrovanadium is used as an additive to improve the qualities of ferrous alloys. One such use is to improve corrosion resistance to alkaline reagents as well as sulfuric and hydrochloric acids. It is also used to improve the tensile strength to weight ratio of the material. One application of such steels is in the chemical processing industry for high pressure high throughput fluid handling systems dealing with industrial scale sulfuric acid production. It is also commonly used for hand tools e.g. spanners (wrenches), screwdrivers, ratchets, etc.

== Composition ==
Vanadium content in ferrovanadium ranges from 35% to 85%. FeV80 (80% Vanadium) is the most common ferrovanadium composition. In addition to iron and vanadium, small amounts of silicon, aluminum, carbon, sulfur, phosphorus, arsenic, copper, and manganese are found in ferrovanadium. Impurities can make up to 11% by weight of the alloy. Concentrations of these impurities determine the grade of ferrovanadium.

Elemental composition of alloy grades (Maximum % weight per element)
Grade	V	Si	Al	C	S	P	As	Cu	Mn
FeV75C0.1	70-85	0.8	2.0	0.1	0.05	0.05	0.05	0.1	0.4
FeV75C0.15	70-85	1.0	2.5	0.15	0.1	0.1	0.05	0.1	0.6
FeV50C0.4	48-60	1.8	0.2	0.4	0.02	0.07	0.01	0.2	2.7
FeV50C0.5	48-60	2.0	0.3	0.5	0.02	0.07	0.01	0.2	4.0
FeV50C0.6	48-60	2.0	0.3	0.6	0.03	0.07	0.02	0.2	5.0
FeV50C0.3	> 50	2.0	2.5	0.3	0.1	0.1	0.05	0.2	0.2
FeV50C0.75	> 50	2.0	2.5	0.75	0.1	0.1	0.05	0.2	0.2
FeV40C0.5	35-48	2.0	0.5	0.5	0.05	0.08	0.03	0.2	2.0
FeV40C0.75	35-48	2.0	0.5	0.75	0.05	0.08	0.03	0.4	4.0
FeV40C1	35-48	2.0	0.5	1.0	0.05	0.1	0.03	0.4	6.0

== Synthesis ==
Eighty-five percent of all vanadium extracted from the Earth is used to create alloys such as ferrovanadium. There are two common ways in which ferrovanadium is produced: silicon reduction and aluminum reduction.

=== Reduction by silicon ===
Vanadium pentoxide (V_{2}O_{5}), ferrosilicon (FeSi75), lime (CaO) and slag (recycled vanadium containing waste) are combined in an electric arc furnace heated to 1850 °C. Silicon in the ferrosilicon reduces the vanadium in V_{2}O_{5} to vanadium metal. The vanadium then interacts with the iron to form ferrovanadium. Excess lime and V_{2}O_{5} are added to use up the silicon and refine the metal. This process produces vanadium concentrations between thirty-five and sixty percent.

2 V_{2}O_{5} + 5 (Fe_{y/5}Si)_{alloy} + 10 CaO → 4 (Fe_{y/4}V)_{alloy} + 5 Ca_{2}SiO_{4}

=== Reduction by aluminum ===
Iron, V_{2}O_{5}, aluminum, and lime are combined in an electric arc furnace. Like the silicon, aluminum reduces the vanadium in V_{2}O_{5} to vanadium metal. The vanadium dissolves into the iron and forms the ferrovanadium alloy. The resulting ferrovanadium has a vanadium concentration between seventy and eighty-five percent.

3 V_{2}O_{5} + 10 Al → 6 V + 5 Al_{2}O_{3}

V_{x} + Fe_{1−x} → (Fe_{1−x}V_{x})_{alloy}

== Toxicology ==
Ferrovanadium dust is a mild irritant that affects the eyes when touched by contaminated skin and the respiratory tract when inhaled. The dust caused chronic bronchitis and pneumonitis in animals exposed to high concentration (1000–2000 mg/m^{3}) at intervals for two months. However, no such long-term effects have been observed in humans.

=== Occupational exposure ===
The American Conference of Governmental Industrial Hygienists (ACGIH) states that an employee who is working eight hours a day, five days a week, can be exposed to ferrovanadium dust in their place of work at concentrations of up to 1.0 mg/m^{3} without adverse effects. Short-term exposures should be kept below 3.0 mg/m^{3}. It is suggested that those working with high concentrations of ferrovanadium dust wear a respirator to prevent inhalation and irritation of the respiratory tract.

== Steel ==
The most common use of ferrovanadium is in the production of steel. In 2017, 94% of consumption of vanadium in the USA was to produce iron and steel alloys. Ferrovanadium and other vanadium alloys are used in carbon steel, alloy steel, high strength steel, and HSLA (High Strength Low Alloy) steel. These steels are then used to make automotive parts, pipes, tools, and more.

The addition of ferrovanadium toughens the steel making it more resistant to temperature and torsion. This increase in strength is a result of the formation of vanadium carbides which have a rigid crystal structure as well as a finer grain size which decreases the ductility of the steel. In addition to adding to the composition of the steel, ferrovanadium can also be used as a coating on the steel. When coated with nitrated ferrovanadium, the abrasion resistance of steel increases 30-50%.

== Market ==
Between 2013 and 2017, the United States imported 13,510 tons of ferrovanadium, a majority of which came from Czechia, Austria, Canada, and South Korea. The price of ferrovanadium has fluctuated dramatically since 1996, hitting an all-time high in 2008 at $76041.61/ton FeV80. In more recent years, it has once again seen an increase in price as environmental standards shut down some of the vanadium producers in China. These shutdowns, as well as the closure of a South African vanadium mine, created a vanadium shortage, forcing ferrovanadium factories to reduce their production of ferrovanadium, decreasing its supply and driving up the price.

== See also ==
- Ferroalloy
- Steel alloy
- Vanadium
- Vanadium(V) oxide
