= Ferrotungsten =

Alloy of tungsten and iron

Identifiers
CAS Number	12604-57-8
3D model (JSmol)	Interactive image
ECHA InfoCard	100.108.319
EC Number	603-117-0
- InChI: InChI=1S/Fe.W; Key: AHIVCQLQCIBVOS-UHFFFAOYSA-N
- SMILES: [Fe].[W]

Properties
Chemical formula	Tungsten (70–82%); Iron
Appearance	white solid
Melting point	1,650 °C (3,000 °F; 1,920 K)
- Except where otherwise noted, data are given for materials in their standard state (at 25 °C [77 °F], 100 kPa). Infobox references

Ferrotungsten (FeW) is a ferroalloy, consisting of iron and tungsten. The metal usually consists of 75%-82% or 70%-75% tungsten.

== Applications ==
Because of its high melting point, ferrotungsten is a robust alloy with applications in aerospace and making of tungsten-containing steel. Tungsten's unique electrical capabilities have made ferrotungsten useful in electron microscopes and IC chips.

== Production ==
Discovered in 1874, world ferrotungsten production today is dominated by China, which in 2008 exported 4,835 t (gross weight) of the alloy. Ferrotungsten is relatively expensive, with the prices around $31–44 per kilogram of contained tungsten. During World War 2, over 21,000,000 lb of Ferro-tungsten and other ferroalloys were shipped to Russia on lend-lease. The cost was more than $12,000,000.

Ferrotungsten comes from rich ore raw materials primarily of wolframite or scheelite.
