= Kalininite =

Thiospinel mineral

General
- Category: Minerals
- Formula: (ZnCr_{2}S_{4})

Kalininite (ZnCr_{2}S_{4}) is a thiospinel mineral found in Russia in 1985 in the Pereval Marble Quarry, Slyudyanka (Sludyanka), Lake Baikal area, Irkutskaya Oblast', Prebaikalia (Pribaikal'e), Eastern-Siberian Region. It was named for P. V. Kalinin, Russian mineralogist and petrologist, investigator of the southern Baikal region.
