= Rio Tuba mine =

Nickel mine in the Philippines

- Location in Philippines
- Location: Palawan, Philippines; 8°34′12″N 117°25′08″E
- Products: Nickel

The Rio Tuba mine is a large nickel mine run by Nickel Asia Corporation in the west of the Philippines in Bataraza, Palawan. Rio Tuba represents one of the largest nickel reserves in the Philippines having an estimated reserve of 60.2 million tonnes (59,200,000 long tons; 66,400,000 short tons) of ore grading 1.27% nickel. The 60.2 million tonnes of ore contains 764,000 tonnes (752,000 long tons; 842,000 short tons) tonnes of nickel metal. Production started in 1969.

The Rio Tuba Mine produced an estimated 46,780 tonnes of nickel in 2022.
