= Cadmoindite =

Cadmium indium sulfide mineral

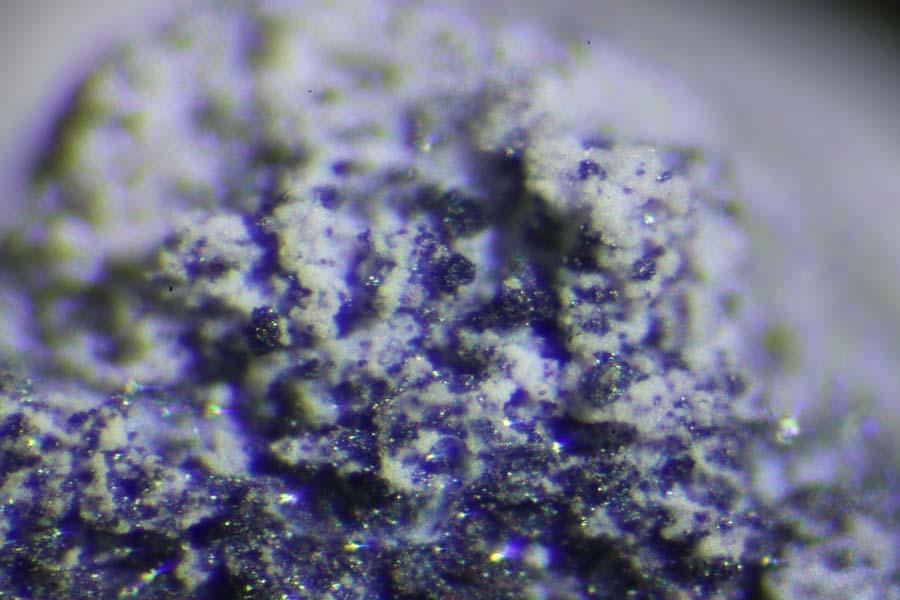
- Cadmoindite, from Kudriavy Volcano, Far Eastern Region, Russian Federation

General
- Category: Sulfide mineral Thiospinel group Spinel structural group
- Formula: CdIn_{2}S_{4}
- IMA symbol: Cad
- Strunz classification: 2.DA.05
- Crystal system: Cubic
- Crystal class: Hexoctahedral (m3̅m); H-M symbol (4/m 3̅ 2/m)
- Space group: Fd3̅m
- Unit cell: a = 10.81 Å; Z = 8

Identification
- Formula mass: 470.32 g/mol
- Color: Black to dark brown
- Crystal habit: Microscopic octahedral crystals
- Fracture: Conchoidal
- Luster: Adamantine
- Diaphaneity: translucent
- Optical properties: Isotropic

Cadmoindite (CdIn_{2}S_{4}) is a rare cadmium indium sulfide mineral discovered in Siberia around the vent of a high-temperature (450–600 °C) fumarole at the Kudriavy volcano, Iturup Island in the Kuril Islands. It has also been reported from the Kateřina Coal Mine in Bohemia, Czech Republic.

== Crystal structure ==
CdIn_{2}S_{4} exhibits the spinel structure, which can be described by a cubic unit cell with 8 tetrahedrally coordinated and 16 tetrahedrally coordinated cation sites. The distribution of Cd(II) and In(III) over the cation sites is difficult to elucidate from standard X-ray diffraction techniques because the two species are isoelectronic, but both Raman spectroscopy measurements on synthetic samples and density functional theory simulations indicate that about 20% of the tetrahedral sites are occupied by In(III) cations.
