= Siegenite =

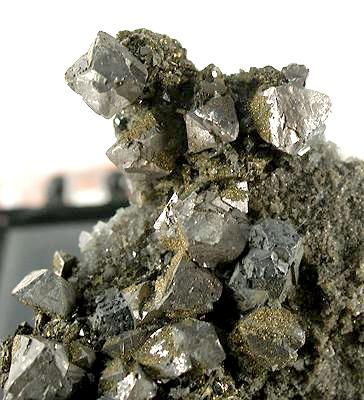
- Siegenite from Buick mine, Bixby, Viburnum Trend District, Iron County, Missouri, USA

General
- Category: Sulfide mineral Thiospinel group Spinel structural group
- Formula: (Ni,Co)_{3}S_{4}
- IMA symbol: Seg
- Strunz classification: 2.DA.05
- Crystal system: Cubic
- Crystal class: m3̅m
- Space group: Fd3̅m (#227)
- Unit cell: a = 9.33 Å; V = 810.94Å^{3}

Identification
- Formula mass: 304.3 - 305 g/mol
- Color: Light to steel-grey, violet-gray (tarnished)
- Crystal habit: As octahedral crystals, granular, massive
- Twinning: On {111}; polysynthetic
- Cleavage: Imperfect on {001}
- Fracture: Irregular to uneven, sub-conchoidal
- Mohs scale hardness: 4.5 - 5.5
- Luster: Metallic
- Streak: Grayish black
- Diaphaneity: Opaque
- Density: 4.5 - 4.8 g/cm^{3} (Measured) 4.83 g/cm^{3} (Calculated)

Siegenite (also called grimmite, or nickel cobalt sulfide) is a ternary transition metal dichalcogenide compound with the chemical formula (Ni,Co)_{3}S_{4}. It has been actively studied as a promising material system for electrodes in electrochemical energy applications due to its better conductivity, greater mechanical and thermal stability, and higher performance compared to metal oxides currently in use. Potential applications of this material system include supercapacitors, batteries, electrocatalysis, dye-sensitized solar cells, photocatalysis, glucose sensors, and microwave absorption.

In synthetic chemistry, a range of chemical compositions with the formula Ni_{x}Co_{3−x}S_{4} (0 < x < 3) are often referred to as the siegenite system. However, according to the new IMA list of minerals (updated November 2022), the normal spinel NiCo_{2}S_{4} is called grimmite, the inverse spinel CoNi_{2}S_{4} is called siegenite, and the endmembers Ni^{2+}(Ni^{3+})_{2}S_{4} and Co^{2+}(Co^{3+})_{2}S_{4} are called polydymite and linnaeite, respectively. In 2020, NiCo_{2}S_{4} (grimmite) is approved as a valid mineral species by the IMA.

== Discovery and occurrence ==
Siegenite was first described in 1850 for an occurrence in the Stahlberg Mine in Müsen, Siegerland, North Rhine-Westphalia, Germany and named for the locality. It occurs in hydrothermal copper-nickel-iron sulfide bearing veins associated with chalcopyrite, pyrrhotite, galena, sphalerite, pyrite, millerite, gersdorffite and ullmannite.

It occurs in a variety of deposits worldwide, including Brestovsko in the central Bosnian Mountains of Serbia; at Kladno in the Czech Republic; Blackcraig, Kirkcudbrightshire, Scotland. In the United States occurrences include the Mine la Motte of Madison County and the Buick mine, Bixby, Iron County and in the Sweetwater mine of Reynolds County in the Lead Belt of Missouri. In Canada, it is known from the Langis mine, Cobalt-Gowganda area, Ontario. In Africa it occurs at Shinkolobwe, Katanga Province and Kilembe, Uganda. In Japan, it is reported from the Kamaishi mine, Iwate Prefecture, and the Yokozuru mine, north Kyushu. It also occurs at Kalgoorlie, Western Australia. It is found at the Browns deposit, Batchelor, Northern Territory, Australia.

== Crystal structure ==
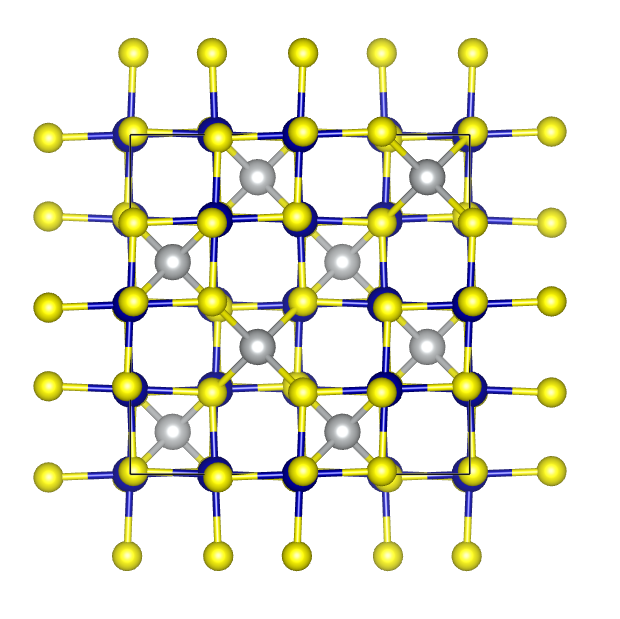
Conventional unit cell of NiCo_{2}S_{4} looking down at the [100] direction. Gray atoms are Ni, blue atoms are Co, and yellow atoms are S.

Siegenite is a member of the thiospinel group, which belongs to the cubic space group $Fd\bar{3}m$ (#227) and has the Pearson symbol $cF56$. Similar to normal spinels, a normal thiospinel unit cell consists of eight FCC sub unit cells of two different types, where S^{2-} anions occupy all the FCC lattice points. The first type of sub unit cell has 2+ cations occupying 2 of the 8 tetrahedral sites and 3+ cations occupying 3/2 of the 4 octahedral sites. The second type of sub unit cell has only 3+ cations occupying 5/2 of the 4 octahedral sites. These two types of sub unit cells are alternatively stacked, forming a NaCl-type superstructure.

For a normal thiospinel (NiCo_{2}S_{4}), Ni^{2+} cations occupy 1/8 of the tetrahedral sites to form NiS_{4} tetrahedra and Co^{3+} cations occupy 1/2 of the octahedral sites to form CoS_{6} octahedra. Each tetrahedron shares corners with 12 neighboring octahedra, and each octahedron shares corners with 6 tetrahedra and edges with 6 octahedra. For an inverse thiospinel (CoNi_{2}S_{4}), Ni^{2+} occupy 1/8 of the octahedral sites and Co^{3+} occupy 1/4 of the tetrahedra sites and 1/4 of the octahedral sites. For a mixed/complex thiospinel, both metal ions occupy tetrahedral and octahedral sites and can be expressed as (A_{x}B_{1−x})_{T_{d}}[A_{2-x}B_{x}]_{O_{h}}X_{4} (0 < x < 1), where A and B are metal ions, x is the degree of inversion, and $T_d$ and $O_h$ denote the tetrahedral and octahedral sites, respectively.

The powder X-ray diffraction (XRD) pattern of siegenite exhibits strong diffraction signals between 20° and 60° 2θ angles. The lattice constant of siegenite is measured to be 9.319 Å based on the strongest reflection at around 32°, corresponding to lattice plane (311), which agrees with the calculated lattice constant of 9.325 Å.

== Electronic properties ==
Unlike many binary and ternary semiconductor oxides, NiCo_{2}S_{4} exhibits metallic properties and high electrical conductivity, which makes it useful as an electrode material in energy storage devices. The resistivity of NiCo_{2}S_{4} is ~10^{3} μΩ cm at room temperature and its temperature coefficient of resistivity is positive and stays constant between 40 K and 300 K, which is indicative of a metallic compound. NiCo_{2}S_{4} also has a very low Seebeck coefficient of 5 μV K^{−1} and a carrier density of 3.18 × 10^{22} cm^{−3} higher than that of silver.

== Synthesis ==
Reported synthetic routes of nickel cobalt sulfide include hydrothermal and solvothermal reactions, solvent-free thermal decomposition of xanthates, SILAR method for thin films, and solution-phase organometallic synthesis. The hydrothermal reaction is the most widely used synthesis method to fabricate intricate nanostructures on highly porous substrates, yielding hierarchical structures that maximize redox-active surface areas and promote high-rate supercapacitive performance of Ni-Co-S-based electrodes.

== Applications ==
=== Batteries and supercapacitors ===
(Ni,Co)_{3}S_{4} is a promising electrode material for batteries and supercapacitors. Since the electronegativity of sulfur is lower than that of oxygen, (Ni,Co)_{3}S_{4} has a more flexible lattice compared to its oxide counterpart, which allows easier electron and ion transport through the structure. Its high ionic conductivity can be attributed to the abundance of available cation sites in the thiospinel structure, and its high redox activity comes from the highly electrochemically active Ni^{2+}/Ni^{3+} and Co^{2+}/Co^{3+} redox couples. In literatures, nanoporous Ni-Co-S composite materials have been shown to have both high specific capacity in Li-based batteries and high capacitance in supercapacitors.

=== Electrocatalysis ===
(Ni,Co)_{3}S_{4} has been considered as an alternative electrocatalyst for HER and OER reactions because of its high conductivity and low cost. It is reported that a overpotential of 87 mV for HER and 251 mV for HER can be achieved using NiCo_{2}S_{4}-based electrode, showing good potential for water splitting applications.
