= Violarite =

Supergene sulfide mineral

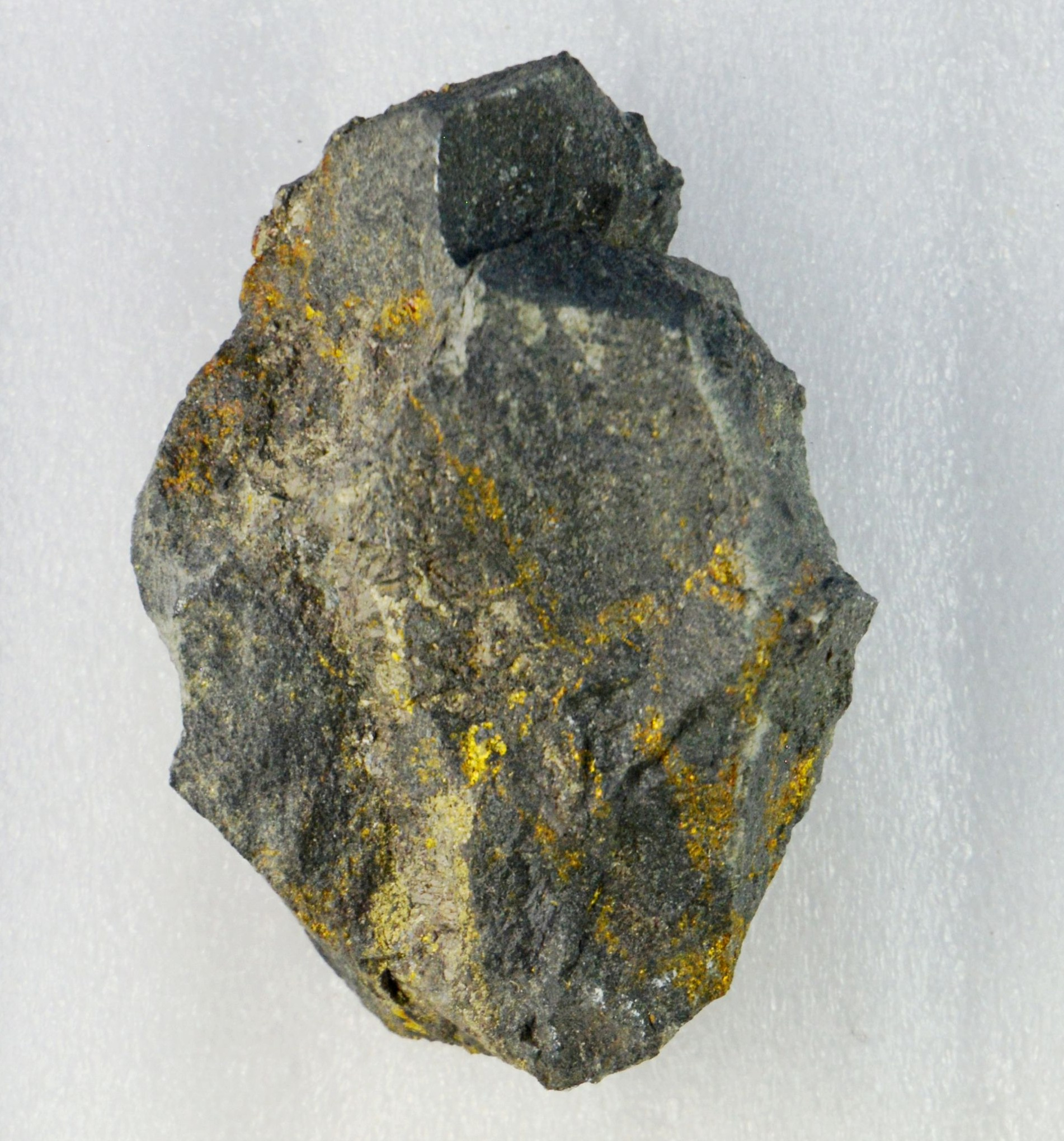

General
- Category: Sulfide mineral Thiospinel group Spinel structural group
- Formula: (Fe^{2+}Ni_{2}^{3+}S_{4})
- IMA symbol: Vio
- Strunz classification: 2.DA.05
- Crystal system: Isometric
- Crystal class: Hexoctahedral (m3̅m); H-M symbol: (4/m 3̅ 2/m)
- Space group: Fd3̅m
- Unit cell: a = 9.46 Å; Z = 8

Identification

Violarite (Fe^{2+}Ni_{2}^{3+}S_{4}) is a supergene sulfide mineral associated with the weathering and oxidation of primary pentlandite nickel sulfide ore minerals.

Violarite crystallises in the isometric system, with a hardness of 4.5 to 5.5 and a specific gravity of about 4, is dark violet grey to copper-red, often with verdigris and patina from associated copper and arsenic sulfides, and is typically in amorphous to massive infill of lower saprolite ultramafic lithologies.

Violarite has a characteristic violet colour, hence the name from the Latin 'violaris' alluding to its colour especially when viewed in polished section under a microscope.

== Paragenesis ==
Violarite is formed by oxidisation of primary sulfide assemblages in nickel sulfide mineralisation. The process of formation involves oxidation of Ni^{2+} and Fe^{2+} which is contained within the primary pentlandite-pyrrhotite-pyrite assemblage.

Violarite is produced at the expense of both pentlandite and pyrrhotite, via the following basic reaction;

Pentlandite + Pyrrhotite --> Violarite + Acid

(Fe,Ni)_{9}S_{8} + Fe_{(1-x)}S + O_{2} → Fe^{2+}Ni_{2}^{3+}S_{4} + H_{2}SO_{3}

Violarite is also reported to be produced in low-temperature metamorphism of primary sulfides, though this is an unusual paragenetic indicator for the mineral.

Continued oxidation of violarite leads to replacement by goethite and formation of a gossaniferous boxwork, with nickel tending to remain as impurities within the goethite or haematite, or rarely as carbonate minerals.

== Occurrence ==
Violarite is reported widely from the oxidised regolith above primary nickel sulfide ore systems worldwide. It is of particular note from the Mount Keith dunite body, Western Australia, where it forms an important ore mineral.

It is also reported from open cast mines around the Kambalda Dome, and Widgiemooltha Dome, in association with polydymite, gaspeite, widgiemoolthalite and hellyerite, among other supergene nickel minerals.

=== Economic importance ===
Violarite is an important transitional ore in many nickel sulfide mines, as it has increased nickel tenor (Ni% as a total of sulfide) and occupies a position within the mineralised profile where it must be extracted to pay for development down to the most valuable fresh mineralisation.

Violarite mineralisation requires different metallurgy to primary nickel sulfides, due to the different nature of its gangue and its flotation properties. This may require additional treatment and processing, so in some cases low-grade violarite mineralisation is considered refractory ore.
