= Fletcherite =

Rare thiospinel sulfide mineral

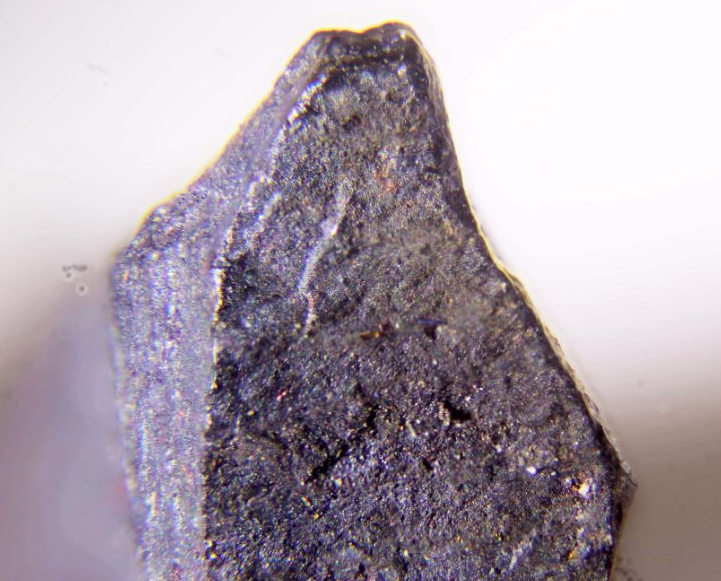

General
- Category: Sulfide mineral Thiospinel group Spinel structural group
- Formula: Cu(Ni,Co)_{2}S_{4}
- IMA symbol: Ftc
- Strunz classification: 2.DA.05
- Crystal system: Cubic
- Crystal class: Hexoctahedral (m3̅m); H–M Symbol: (4/m 3̅ 2/m)
- Space group: Fd3̅m
- Unit cell: a = 9.520 Å; Z = 8

Identification
- Color: Steel gray, creamy white in polished section
- Crystal habit: Minute subhedral to euhedral crystals typically enclosed within other sulfide minerals
- Mohs scale hardness: 5
- Luster: Metallic
- Diaphaneity: Opaque
- Specific gravity: 4.76 calculated
- Polish luster: Good polish with moderate reflectivity
- Optical properties: Isotropic

Fletcherite is a rare thiospinel sulfide mineral with formula Cu(Ni,Co)_{2}S_{4}. It is an opaque metallic steel gray mineral which crystallizes in the cubic crystal system. It is a member of the linnaeite group.

It was first described in 1977 for an occurrence in the Fletcher Mine, Viburnum Trend (New Lead Belt), near Centerville, Reynolds County, Missouri.

It occurs as a dissemination within copper sulfide minerals in mineralization replacing dolomite at the type locality in the Fletcher mine where it is associated with vaesite, pyrite, covellite, chalcopyrite, bornite and digenite. In an occurrence in Kalgoorlie, Australia it is found in black slate associated with pyrrhotite.
