= Nickel pig iron =

World production of nickel pig iron, and proportion of that in the primary nickel production.

Nickel pig iron (NPI) is a low grade ferronickel invented in China as a cheaper alternative to pure nickel for the production of stainless steel. The production process of nickel pig iron utilizes lateritic nickel ores instead of pure nickel sold on the world market. The alternative was developed as a response to the high price of pure nickel. The estimated cost of a ton of nickel pig iron ranged between US$16,500 and $18,000 in 2012, and this cheaper substitute for pure nickel influences the price of nickel on the world market by lowering the demand in certain applications, the most important being the production of stainless steel, representing about two-thirds of nickel use.

Nickel pig iron is made of low-grade nickel ore, coking coal, and a mixture of gravel and sand as an aggregate. This mixture is heated in either a blast furnace or an electric arc furnace depending on the desired grade. Impurities are then removed via smelting and sintering processes and the resulting nickel pig iron contains four to 13 percent pure nickel. According to the Canadian city of Sudbury, nickel pig iron equals "dirty nickel" because the production process is not environmentally friendly, the carbon dioxide emissions being particularly high. China had imported most of the nickel containing ore from Indonesia and the Philippines, but as of Jan 2014, Indonesia has banned the export of ore. China imported 53 percent of the nickel ore from Indonesia in 2011.

While China is credited with the invention of NPI, there are reports that NPI has been around for more than 100 years, but it was the Chinese who successfully made the production commercially viable.

== See also ==
- Pig iron
