= Polydymite =

Supergene thiospinel sulfide mineral

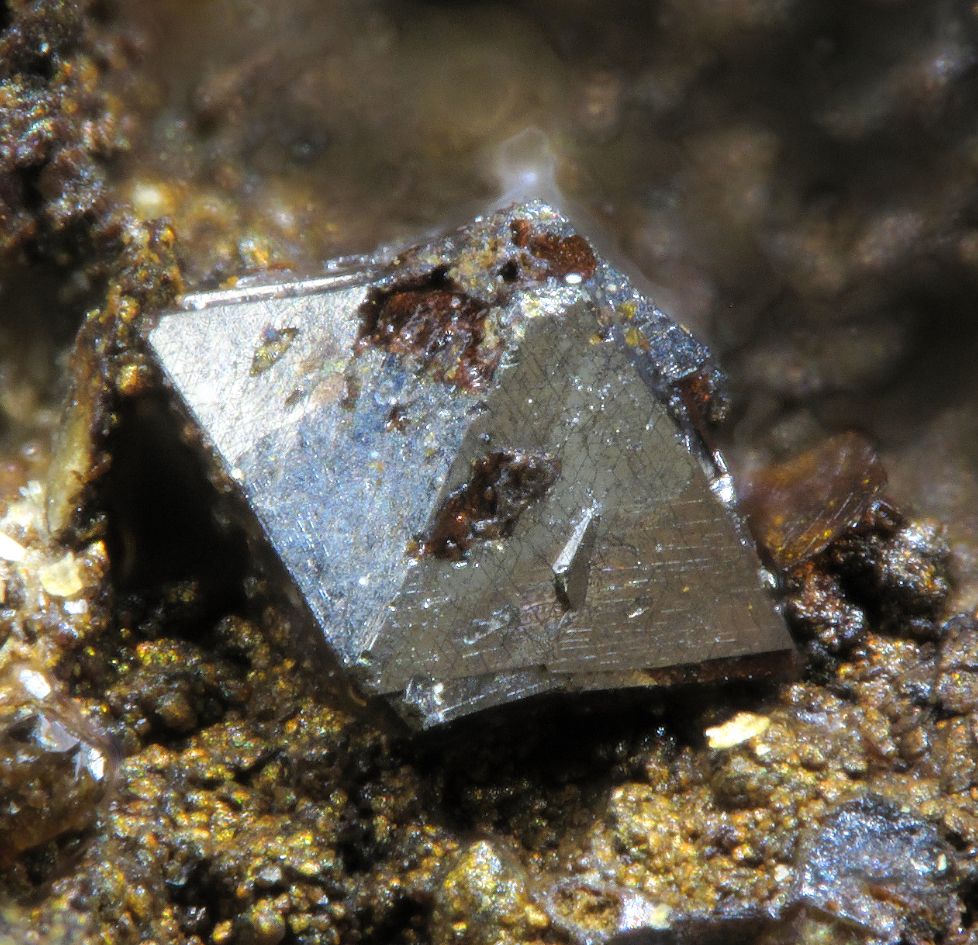

General
- Category: Sulfide mineral Thiospinel group Spinel structural group
- Formula: Ni_{3}S_{4}
- IMA symbol: Pld
- Strunz classification: 2.DA.05
- Crystal system: Cubic
- Crystal class: Hexoctahedral (m3̅m); H-M symbol: (4/m 3̅ 2/m)
- Space group: Fd3̅m
- Unit cell: a = 9.48 Å; Z = 8

Identification
- Color: Pale to steel-gray
- Crystal habit: As octahedral crystals, massive, granular to compact
- Twinning: Twinning on {111}
- Cleavage: Indistinct on {001}
- Fracture: Conchoidal to uneven
- Mohs scale hardness: 4.5 – 5.5
- Luster: Metallic
- Streak: Black gray
- Diaphaneity: Opaque
- Specific gravity: 4.5 – 4.8
- Alters to: Tarnishes to copper-red

Polydymite, Ni^{2+}Ni_{2}^{3+}S_{4}, is a supergene thiospinel sulfide mineral associated with the weathering of primary pentlandite nickel sulfide.

Polydymite crystallises in the isometric system, with a hardness of 4.5 to 5.5 and a specific gravity of about 4, is dark violet gray to copper-red, often with verdigris and patina from associated copper and arsenic sulfides, and is typically in amorphous to massive infill of lower saprolite ultramafic lithologies.

Polydymite is the nickel equivalent of violarite and in many cases these two minerals are formed together, potentially in solid solution.

Common contaminants of polydymite are cobalt and iron. Polydymite forms a series with linnaeite, Co^{+2}Co^{+3}_{2}S_{4}.

== Paragenesis ==
Polydymite is formed by oxidisation of primary sulfide assemblages in nickel sulfide mineralisation. The process of formation involves oxidation of Ni^{2+} and Fe^{2+} which is contained within the primary pentlandite-pyrrhotite-pyrite assemblage.

Continued oxidation of polydymite leads to replacement by goethite and formation of a gossaniferous boxwork, with nickel tending to remain as impurities within the goethite or hematite, or rarely as carbonate minerals.

== Occurrence ==
Polydymite is reported widely from the oxidised regolith above primary nickel sulfide ore systems worldwide. It is less common than related violarite, due to the high iron content of most primary sulfides.

=== Economic importance ===
Polydymite is an important transitional ore in many nickel sulfide mines, as it has increased nickel tenor (Ni% as a total of sulfide) and occupies a position within the mineralised profile where it must be extracted to pay for development down to the more valuable primary (hypogene) mineralisation.
