= Linnaeite =

Cobalt sulfide mineral

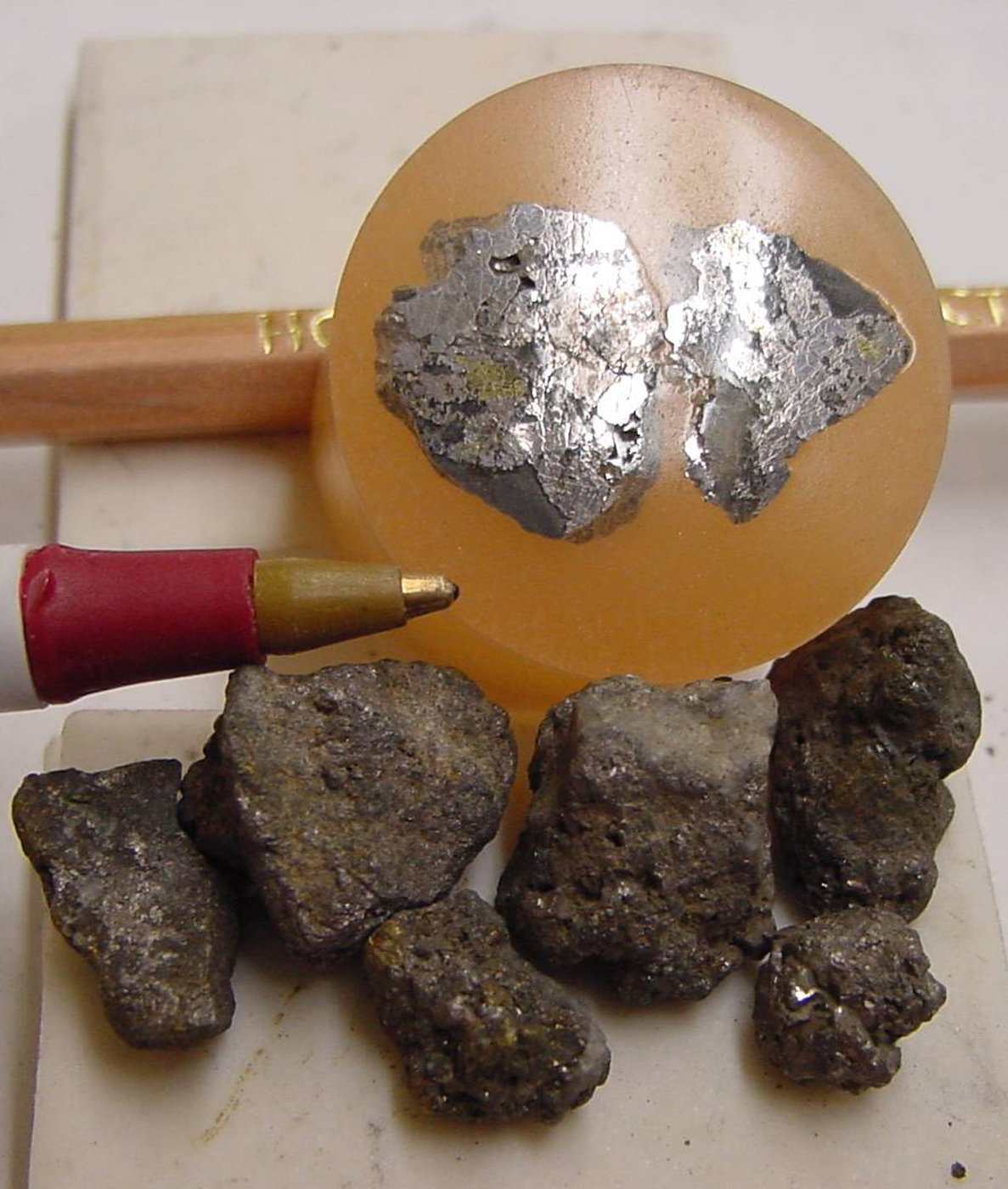
- Linnaeite samples and polished section

General
- Category: Sulfide mineral Thiospinel group Spinel structural group
- Formula: Co^{+2}Co^{+3}_{2}S_{4}
- IMA symbol: Lin
- Strunz classification: 2.DA.05
- Crystal system: Cubic
- Crystal class: Hexoctahedral (m3̅m); H-M symbol: (4/m 3̅ 2/m)
- Space group: Fd3̅m
- Unit cell: a = 9.43 Å; Z = 8

Identification
- Color: Steel gray to gray violet
- Crystal habit: As octahedral crystals; massive, granular
- Twinning: On {111}
- Cleavage: Imperfect on {001}
- Fracture: Subconchoidal
- Mohs scale hardness: 4.5–5.5
- Luster: Metallic
- Streak: Grayish-black
- Diaphaneity: Opaque
- Specific gravity: 4.8–5.8
- Alters to: Tarnishes in air

Linnaeite is a cobalt sulfide mineral with the composition Co^{+2}Co^{+3}_{2}S_{4}. It was discovered in 1845 in Västmanland, Sweden, and was named to honor Carl Linnaeus (1707–1778).

Linnaeite forms a series with polydymite, Ni^{+2}Ni^{+3}_{2}S_{4}. Linnaeite is found in hydrothermal veins with other cobalt and nickel sulfides in many localities around the world.
