= Ferroalloy =

Class of iron alloys

A ferroalloy is an alloy of iron with a high proportion of one or more other elements such as manganese (Mn), aluminium (Al), or silicon (Si). They are used in the production of steels and alloys. The alloys impart distinctive qualities to steel and cast iron or serve important functions during production and are, therefore, closely associated with the iron and steel industry, the leading consumer of ferroalloys. The leading producers of ferroalloys in 2014 were China, South Africa, India, Russia and Kazakhstan, which accounted for 84% of the world production. World production of ferroalloys was estimated as 52.8 million tonnes in 2015.

== Compounds ==
The main ferroalloys are:

- FeAl – ferroaluminum
- FeB – ferroboron – 12–20% of boron, max. 3% of silicon, max. 2% aluminium, max. 1% of carbon
- FeCe – ferrocerium
- FeCr – ferrochromium
- FeMg – ferromagnesium
- FeMn – ferromanganese
- FeMo – ferromolybdenum – min. 60% Mo, max. 1% Si, max. 0.5% Cu
- FeNb – ferroniobium
- FeNi – ferronickel (and nickel pig iron)
- FeP – ferrophosphorus
- FeSi – ferrosilicon – 15–90% Si
- FeSiMg – ferrosilicon magnesium (with Mg 4 to 25%), also called nodulizer
- FeTa – ferrotantalum
- FeTi – ferrotitanium – 10..30–65..75% Ti, max. 5–6.5% Al, max. 1–4% Si
- FeU – ferrouranium
- FeV – ferrovanadium
- FeW – ferrotungsten

== Production, by processes ==
Evolution of the global ferroalloys production, by processes

Ferroalloys are produced generally by two methods : in a blast furnace or in an electric arc furnace. Blast furnace production continuously decreased during the 20th century, whereas the electric arc production is still increasing. Today, ferromanganese can be still efficiently produced in a blast furnace, but, even in this case, electric arc furnace are spreading. More commonly, ferroalloys are produced by carbothermic reactions, involving reduction of oxides with carbon (as coke) in the presence of iron. Some ferroalloys are produced by the addition of elements into molten iron.

It is also possible to produce some ferroalloys by direct reduction processes. For example, the Krupp-Renn Process is used in Japan to produce ferronickel.

== Production and consumption, by ferroalloys ==
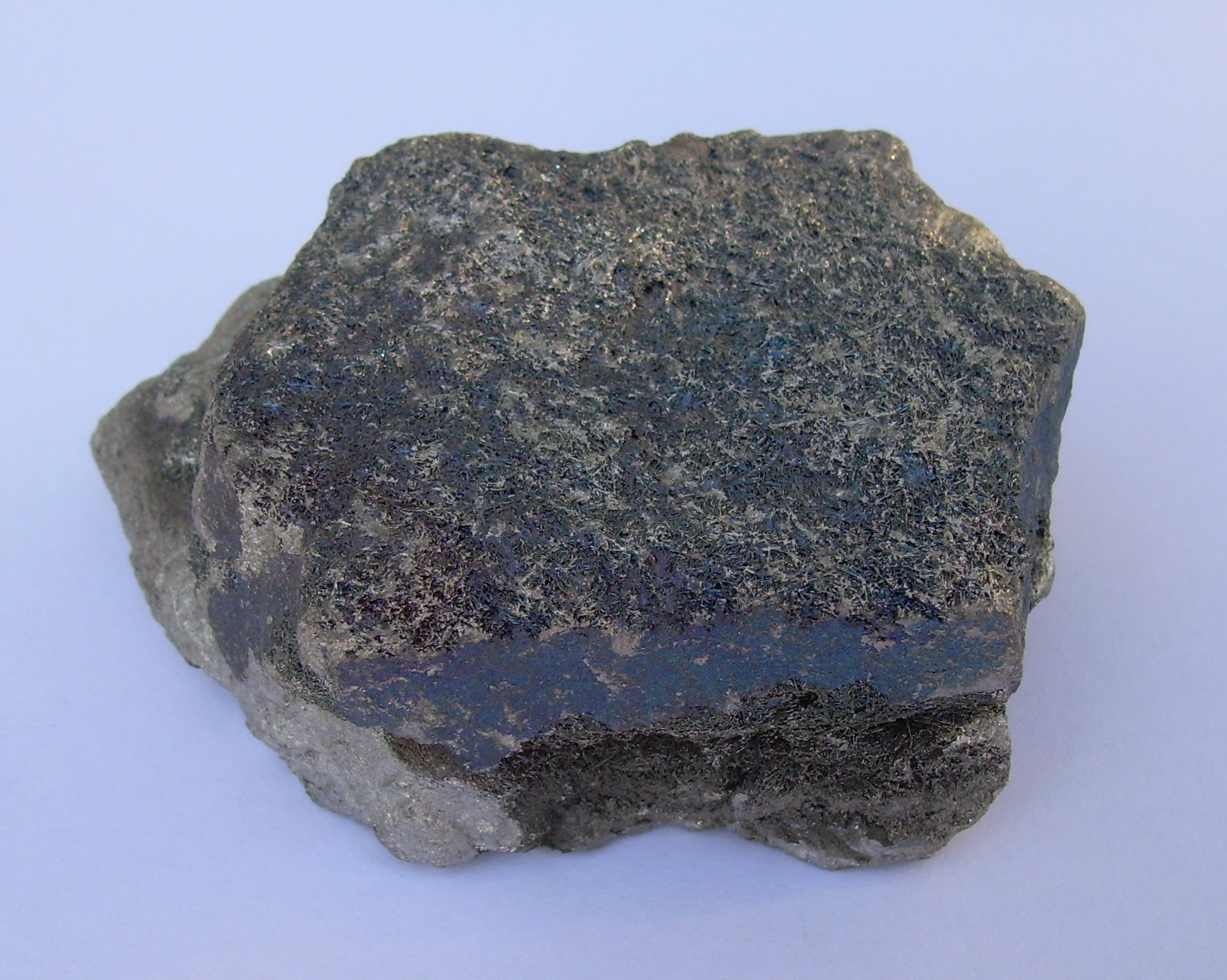
Ferrochromium

=== Ferrochromium ===
The leading world chromite ore-producing countries in 2014 were South Africa (12 Mt), Kazakhstan (3.7 Mt), India (3.5 Mt), and Turkey (2.6 Mt). Most of the chromite ore production was smelted in electric-arc furnaces to produce ferrochromium for the metallurgical industry. The leading world ferrochromium-producing countries in 2014 were China (4.5 Mt), South Africa (3.6 Mt), Kazakhstan (1.2 Mt) and India (0.9 Mt). Most of the 11.7 Mt of ferrochromium produced worldwide was consumed in the manufacture of stainless steel which totalled 41.7 Mt in 2014.

=== Ferromanganese ===
Two manganese ferroalloys, ferromanganese and silicomanganese, are key ingredients for steelmaking. China is the leading world producer of manganese ferroalloys (2.7 Mt), with output much larger than the combined output of the next three biggest producers—Brazil (0.34 Mt), South Africa (0.61 Mt) and Ukraine (0.38 Mt).

=== Ferromolybdenum ===
Major producers of ferromolybdenum are Chile (16,918 t), China (40,000 t) and the United States (which, in 2008, accounted for 78% of world molybdenite ore production. Canada, Mexico and Peru accounted for the remainder. Molybdenite concentrates are roasted to form molybdic oxide, which can be converted into ferromolybdenum, molybdenum chemicals, or molybdenum metal. Although the United States was the second leading molybdenum-producing country in the world in 2008, it imported more than 70% of its ferromolybdenum requirements in 2008, mostly for the steel industry (83% of ferromolybdenum consumed).

=== Ferronickel ===
Characteristics, 17–24% Ni
Density	3.8 g/cm^{3}
Melting point	1500°C
Boiling point	2900°C

In 2014, about 33% of the world’s annual new nickel was ferronickel, an extensive review article of which was published by Swartzendruber et al in 1991. Many of the meteorites that fall to Earth turn out to be ferronickel, and take the form of kamacite and/or taenite. Ferronickel has a face-centred cubic crystal structure (via Ni). It can take the form of ferrite, martensite, or austenite. The binary Fe-Ni system has been investigated for analogic purposes to steel because the presence of nickel in high-alloy steels such as austenitic stainless steels and maraging steels is a key driver for the transition from body-centered cubic ferrite to face-centered cubic austenite.

In the late 20th century, 60% of nickel production was based on the matte smelting of sulfide ores, this did not lend itself to ferronickel production. According to 2003 data, the share of laterites in primary nickel production was reported to be 42%. World annual production of ferronickel in 2014 was around 250,000 tonnes. The two largest producers were BHP and Société Le Nickel. Laterite ores are often used to supply the production process. The RKEF process is often used. The energy consumption per tonne of product is high for laterite ores because of the low-grade feed, and hence produces a lot of waste slag and gaseous pollution. Generally, over 90% of the furnace output is in the form of slag. The technique of refining molten ferronickel is a topic for specialists, and because of ore content variability the processes might even need to be tailored by source: for example the Larco process of Greek ores. "The main reason for adding nickel in ferrous alloys is to promote an austenitic microstructure. Nickel generally increases ductility, toughness and corrosion resistance." Nickel pig iron is distinguished from ferronickel by the former's low weight fraction (4–10%) of nickel and high carbon content (>3%). In contrast, ferronickel is a relatively pure binary alloy.

In 2008, the major ferronickel-producing countries were Japan (301,000 t), New Caledonia (144,000 t) and Colombia (105,000 t). Together, these three countries accounted for about 51% of world production if China is excluded. Ukraine, Indonesia, Greece, and Macedonia, in descending order of gross weight output, all produced between 68,000 t and 90,000 t of ferronickel, accounting for an additional 31%, excluding China. China was excluded from statistics because its industry produced large tonnages of nickel pig iron in addition to a spectrum of conventional ferronickel grades, for an estimated combined output of 590,000 t gross weight. The nickel content of individual Chinese products varied from about 1.6% to as much as 80%, depending upon customer end use.

In the United States, the steel industry accounted for virtually all the ferronickel consumed in 2008, with more than 98% used in stainless and heat-resistant steels; no ferronickel was produced in the US in 2008.

The nickel pig iron is a low grade ferronickel made in China, which is very popular since the 2010s.

=== Ferrosilicon ===
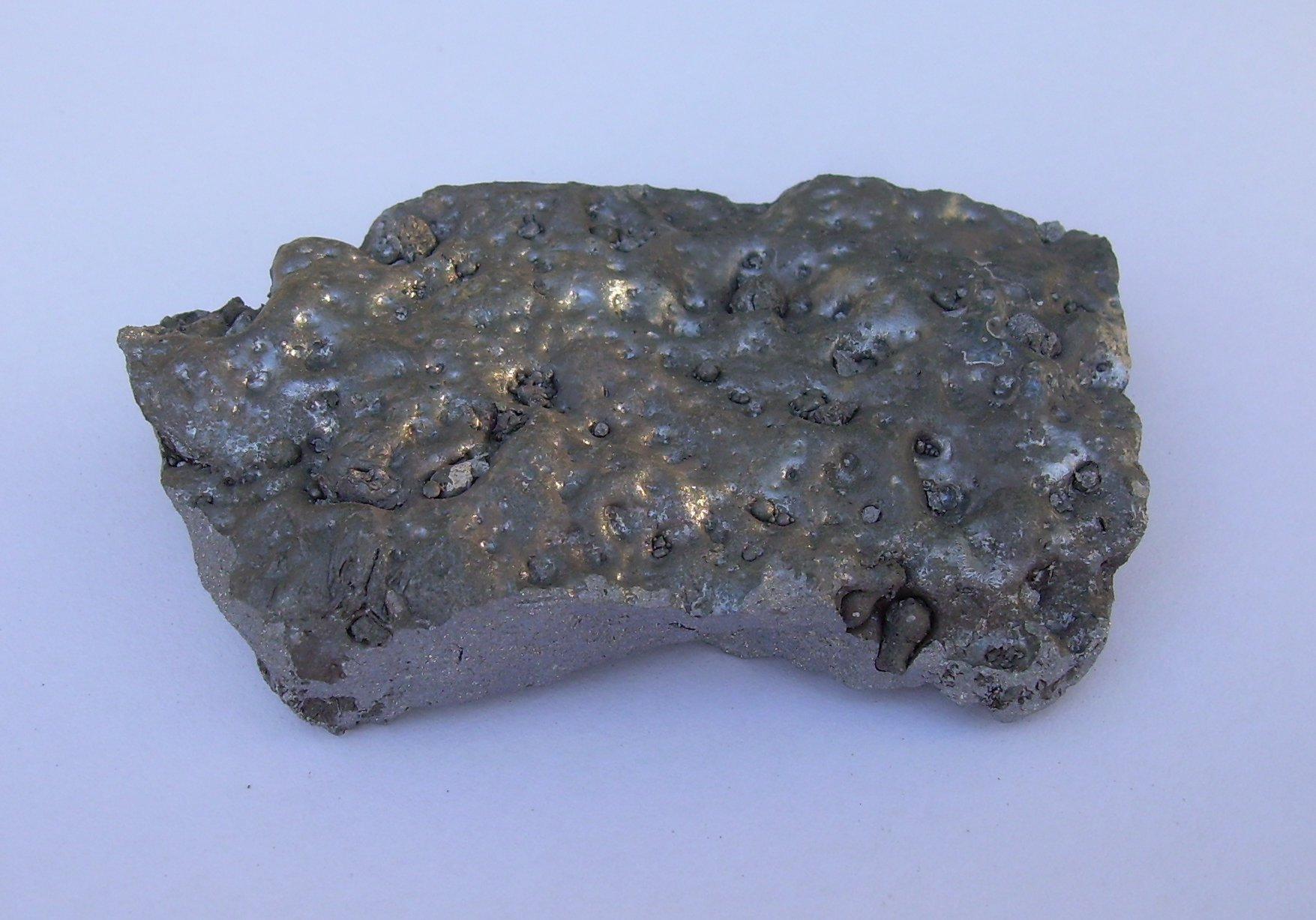
Ferrosilicon

Silicon ferroalloy consumption is driven by cast iron and steel production, where silicon alloys are used as deoxidizers. Some silicon metal was also used as an alloying agent with iron. On the basis of silicon content, net production of ferrosilicon and miscellaneous silicon alloys in the US was 148,000 t in 2008. China is the major supplier, which in 2008 produced more ferrosilicon (4.9 Mt) than the rest of the world combined. Other major manufacturers are Norway (0.21 Mt), Russia (0.85 Mt) and US (0.23 Mt).

=== Ferrotitanium ===
Titanium is used in steelmaking for deoxidation, grain-size control, and carbon and nitrogen control and stabilization. During steelmaking, titanium is usually introduced as ferrotitanium because of its relatively low melting temperature and high density. Steels with relatively high titanium content include interstitial-free, stainless and high-strength low-alloy steels. Ferrotitanium is usually produced by induction melting of titanium scrap with iron or steel; however, it also is produced directly from titanium mineral concentrates. The standard grades of ferrotitanium are 30% and 70% titanium. Ferrosilicon-titanium also is produced to allow the simultaneous addition of silicon and titanium. The leading ferrotitanium producing countries include Brazil, China, India, Japan, Russia, Ukraine, United Kingdom and the United States.

=== Ferrotantalum ===
Ferrotantalum is added to molten steel to create hardenable specialty steels. It is also used as welding material, spraying powder, and for powder metallurgy applications.

=== Ferrotungsten ===
Tungsten is an important alloying element in high-speed and other tool steels, and is used to a lesser extent in some stainless and structural steels. Tungsten is often added to steel melts as ferrotungsten, which can contain up to 80% tungsten. World ferrotungsten production is dominated by China, which in 2008 exported 4,835 t (gross weight) of the alloy. Ferrotungsten is relatively expensive, with the prices around $31–44 per kilogram of contained tungsten.

=== Ferrovanadium ===
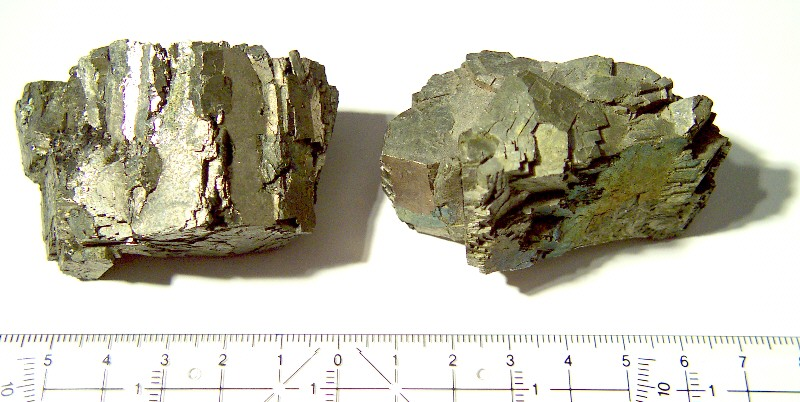
Ferrovanadium chunks

In 2008, China, Russia (12,000 t) and South Africa (17,000 t) accounted for 98% of world vanadium mine production. In these three countries, vanadium was primarily recovered from titanium-bearing magnetite ore processed to produce pig iron. The process entails aluminothermic reduction of vanadium(V) oxide, aluminium (as oxide getter), and scrap iron. This produces a slag containing 20% to 24% vanadium pentoxide, which can be further processed to ferrovanadium containing 40% to 50% vanadium. Of the 5,090 t of vanadium consumed in the United States in 2008, 84% came from ferrovanadium and nearly all of it (99%) went into steel manufacturing.
