= Krupp–Renn process =

Direct-reduction steelmaking process

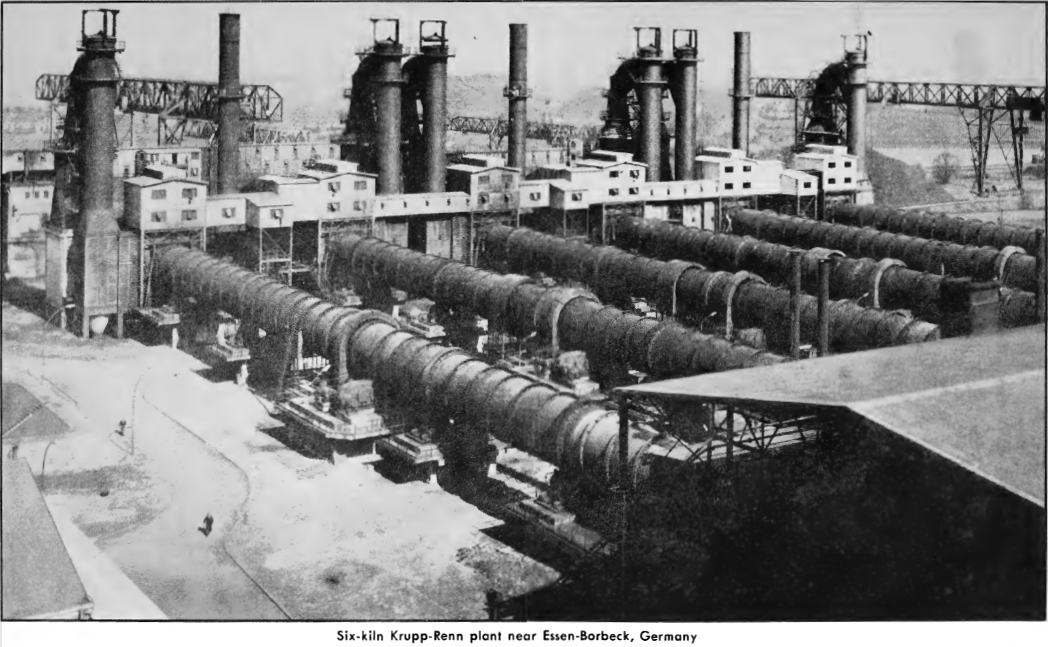
View of the six rotary furnaces at the Essen–Borbeck direct reduction plant, c. 1964

The Krupp–Renn process was a direct reduction steelmaking process used from the 1930s to the 1970s. It used a rotary furnace and was one of the few technically and commercially successful direct reduction processes in the world, acting as an alternative to blast furnaces due to their coke consumption. The Krupp–Renn process consumed mainly hard coal and had the unique characteristic of partially melting the charge. This method is beneficial for processing low-quality or non-melting ores, as their waste material forms a protective layer that can be easily separated from the iron. It generates Luppen, nodules of pre-reduced iron ore, which can be easily melted down.

The first industrial furnaces emerged in the 1930s, firstly in Nazi Germany and then in the Japanese Empire. During the 1950s, new facilities were constructed, notably in Czechoslovakia and West Germany. The process was discontinued in the early 1970s, with a few nuances.

It was unproductive, intricate to master, and only pertinent to certain ores. In the beginning of the 21st century, Japan modernized the process to manufacture ferronickel, which is the sole surviving variant.

== History ==
=== Setting up ===
The direct reduction of iron ore principle was tested in the late 19th century using high-temperature stirring of ore powder mixed with coal and a small amount of limestone to adjust the ore's acidity. Carl Wilhelm Siemens' direct reduction process, which was sporadically employed in the United States and United Kingdom in the 1880s, is particularly noteworthy. This process is based on using a 3-meter in diameter and similarly lengthy drum with a horizontal axis for blowing gases preheated by two regenerators.

The metallurgy industry underwent much research regarding the implementation of rotary tubular furnaces, inspired by similar equipment used in cement works. The Basset process, developed during the 1930s, is capable of even producing molten cast iron. In the 1920s, German metallurgist Friedrich Johannsen, head of the metallurgy department at the Gruson plant and professor at the Clausthal University of Technology, explored the metallurgical applications of this type of furnace. He filed a series of patents for removing volatile metals from steel raw materials.

During the 1930s Johannsen initiated the development of direct-reduction iron production. The first installation underwent testing from 1931 to 1933 at the Gruson plant in Magdeburg. Research on the Krupp–Renn process continued until 1939 at the Krupp facility in Essen-Borbeck. The process, named after the Krupp company that created it and the Rennfeuer, translating to "low furnace," displayed potential. As a result, Krupp procured patents overseas to safeguard the invention after 1932.

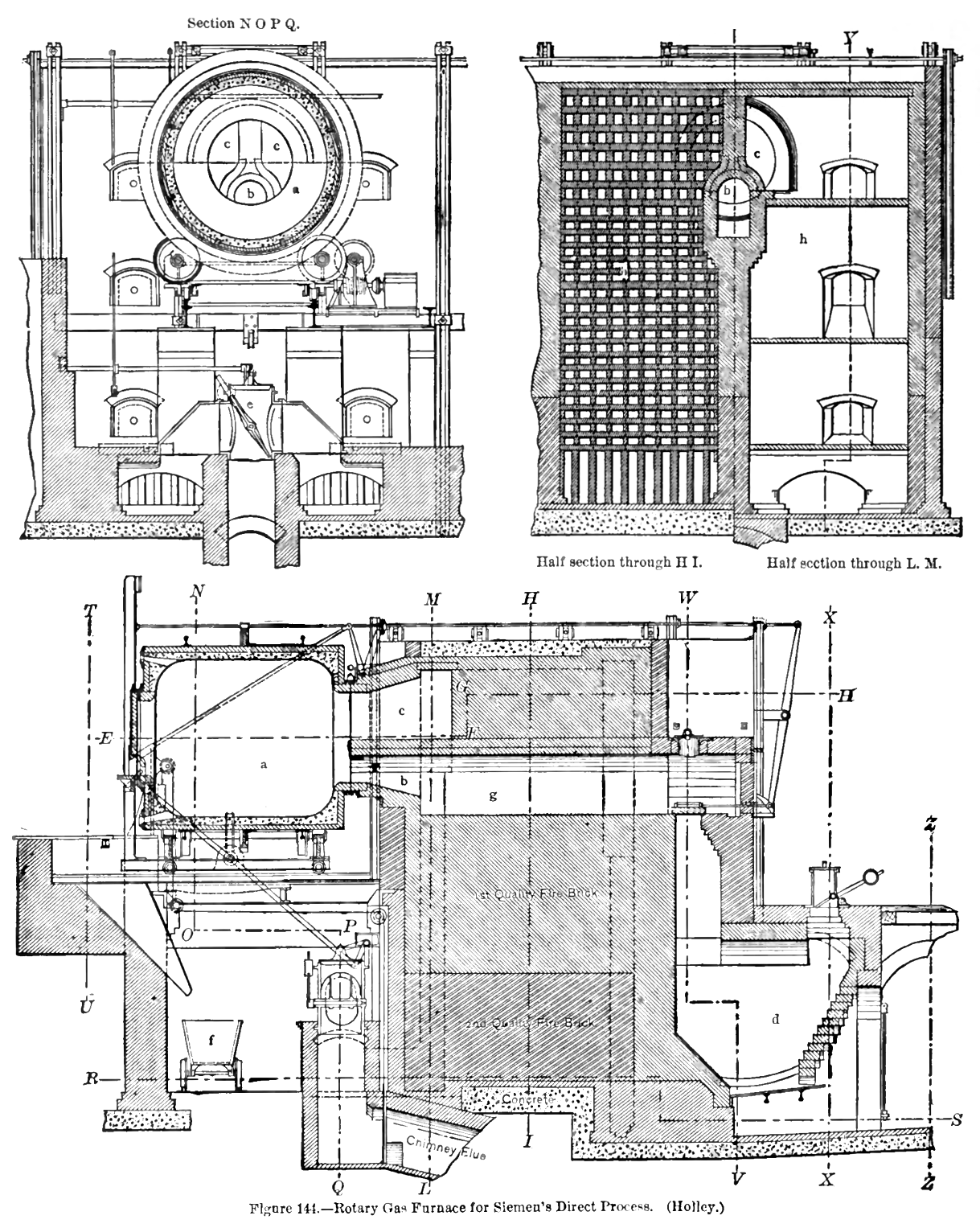
Direct reduction furnace invented by Siemens

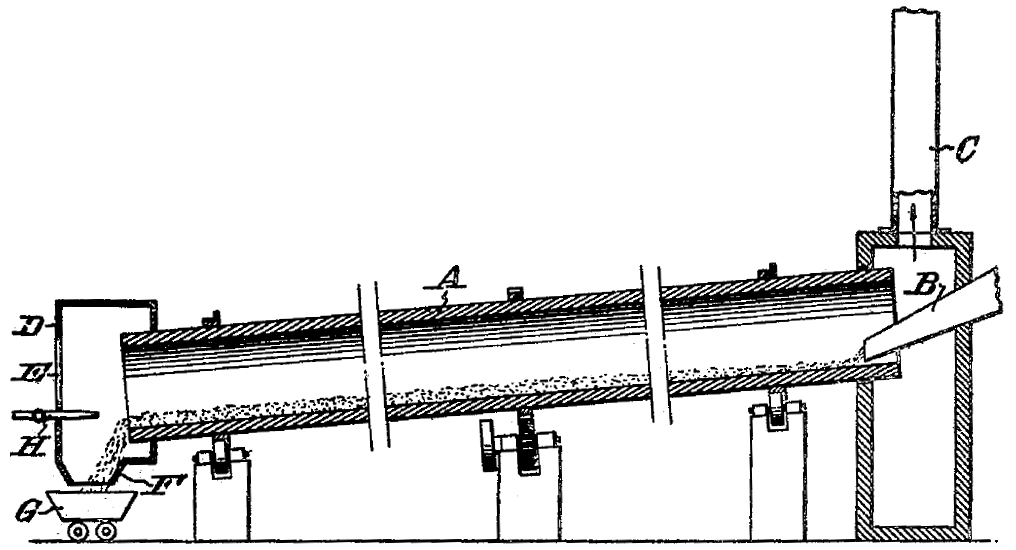
Johannsen's 1927 patent on a furnace for recovering volatile elements

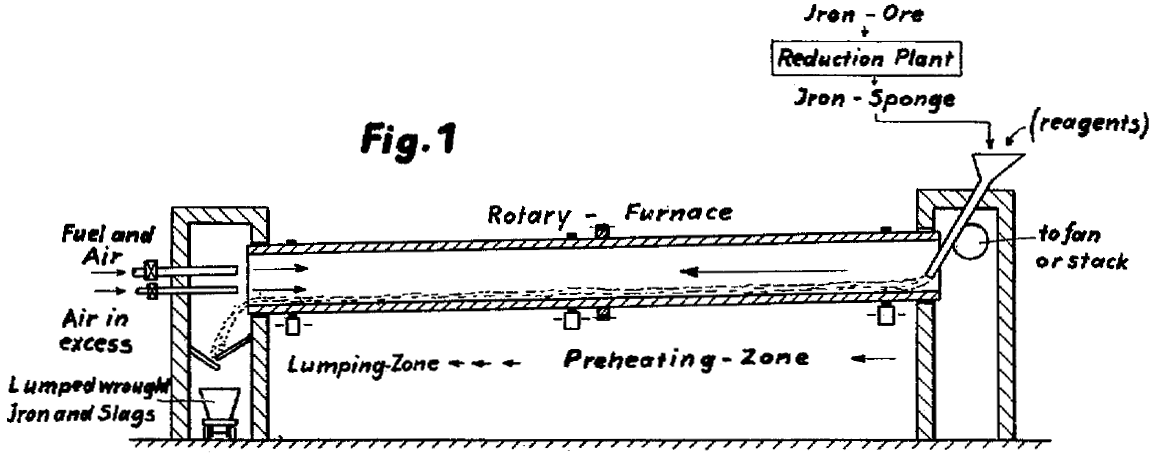
Johannsen's first US patent on the Krupp–Renn process, filed in 1934

=== Adoption ===
In 1945 there were 38 furnaces worldwide, each with a capacity of 1 Mt/year. (Note: Johannsen arrived at a cumulative built capacity of 3.2 Mt/year in 1945.) The process was favored in Germany due to the autarky policy of the Nazi regime, which prioritized the use of low-quality domestic iron ore. The transfer of technology between Nazi Germany and Imperial Japan led to the Japanese Empire benefiting from this process. Furnaces were installed in the co-prosperity sphere and operated by Japanese technicians. By the eve of the Pacific War, the process was being used in four steelworks in Japan.

After World War II all installations in Germany, China, and North Korea were dismantled, with 29 furnaces sent to the Soviet Union as war reparations. Only the Japanese and Czechoslovak plants remained functional.

In the 1950s Krupp rebuilt several large furnaces in Spain, Greece, and Germany. The Czechoslovaks were the primary drivers, constructing 16 furnaces and increasing process efficiency. The Great Soviet Encyclopedia reports that over 65 industrial plants, ranging from 60 to 110 meters in length and 3.6 to 4.6 meters in diameter, were constructed between 1930 and 1950. By 1960, 50 furnaces were producing 2 million tons per year in several countries.

=== Disappearance ===
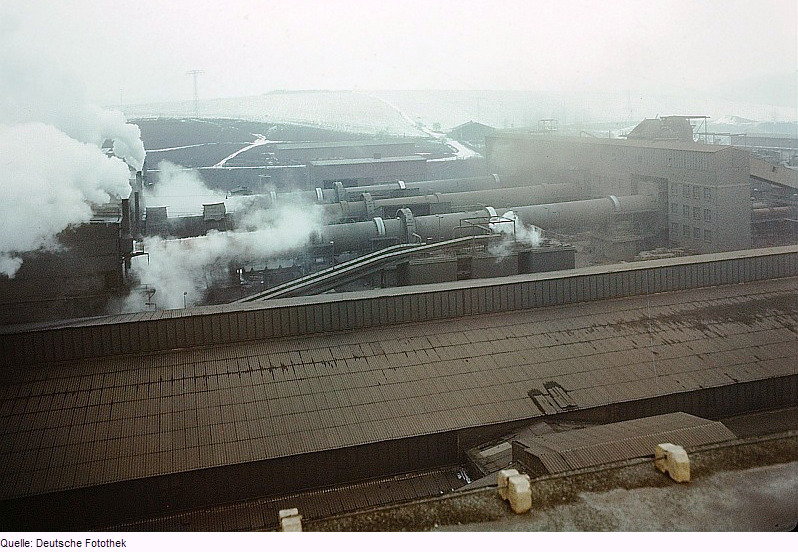
Krupp-Renn furnaces at the nickel smelter in St. Egidien, GDR, in 1982. These furnaces, shut down in 1990, were among the last to be operational.

The Soviet Union recovered 29 furnaces as war damage, but failed to gain significant profits from them. According to sources, the Red Army's destructive techniques in dismantling German industrial plants proved inappropriate and wasted valuable resources. It was also challenging for Russians to reconstruct these factories within the Soviet Union. Travelers from Berlin to Moscow reported observing German machinery scattered, largely deteriorating, along every meter of track and shoulder, suffering from the harsh climatic conditions. The Russian iron and steel industry did not heavily rely on technological input from the West. Eventually, the Eastern Bloc only maintained this marginal technology to a limited extent in the recently sovietized European countries, where it was eventually abandoned.

Meanwhile large furnaces rebuilt in the 1950s in West Germany operated for approximately ten years before shutting down, due to the low cost of scrap and imported ore. (Note: In 1962, ore imported from the Kiruna mine (northern Sweden) had an iron content of 63.69 points, compared with 53.80 points for Ruhr ore. Between 1959 and 1960, ore imports into Germany rose from 20 to 33.7 million tonnes annually.) The process then vanished from West Germany, concurrently with Western Europe.

In Japan furnaces also progressed towards increasingly bigger tools. However, the dwindling of local ferruginous sand deposits, along with the low cost of scrap and imported ores, eventually resulted in the gradual discontinuation of the process. The process was steadily improved by the Japanese, who developed it under various names for specialized products including ferroalloys and the recycling of steelmaking by-products. Currently, at the start of the 21st century, the Krupp–Renn process is exclusively used for ferronickel production in Japan.

By 1972 most plants in Czechoslovakia, Japan, and West Germany had ceased operations. The process was widely considered obsolete and no longer garnered the attention of industrialists.

== Process ==
=== General principles ===
Schematic diagram of the Krupp–Renn process

The Krupp–Renn process is a direct reduction process that uses a long tubular furnace similar to those found in cement production. The most recent units constructed have a diameter of approximately 4.5 meters and a length of 110 meters. The residence time of the product is influenced by the slope and speed of rotation of the rotary kiln, which is inclined at an angle of roughly 2.5 percent.

Prior to usage, the iron ore is crushed to less than 6 mm in particle size. The iron ore is introduced into the furnace upstream and mixed with a small amount of fuel, typically hard coal. After 6 to 8 hours, it exits the furnace as pre-reduced iron ore at 1,000 °C. The amount of iron recovered ranges from 94% to 97.5% of the initial iron in the ore.

A burner located at the lower end of the furnace provides heat, transforming it into a counter-current reactor. The fuel comprises finely pulverized coal, which, upon high-temperature combustion, generates reducing gas primarily consisting of CO. Once the furnace reaches an optimal temperature, the ore-coal mixture can serve as the primary fuel source.

The fumes exiting the furnace's upper end attain temperatures ranging from 850 to 900 °C and are subsequently cooled and purged of dust by water injection before discharge through the chimney.

The process is efficient in producing ferronickel due to the proximity of its constituent elements. At 800 °C, carbon easily reduces iron (Note: This chemical proximity between iron and nickel translates into similar carbothermal reactivity. But having close densities is just as important to avoid segregation of the materials being stirred in the furnace.) and nickel oxides, while the gangue's other oxides are not significantly reduced. Specifically, iron(II) oxide (or wustite), which is the stable iron oxide at 800 °C, has a reducibility similar to that of nickel(II) oxide, making it impossible to reduce one without reducing the other.

=== Process characteristics ===
The rotary kiln's maximum temperature ranges between 1,230 and 1,260 °C, which significantly exceeds the 1,000 to 1,050 °C threshold for iron oxide reduction. The main objective is to achieve a paste-like consistency of the ore gangue. The reduced iron agglomerates into 3 to 8 mm metal nodules called Luppen. If the infusibility of the gangue is high, the temperature must be increased, up to 1,400 °C for a basic charge. It is crucial to control the gangue's hot viscosity. Among rotary drum direct reduction processes, it stands out for using high temperatures.

Direct reduction processes using rotating drums
	1	2	3	4	5
Consistency of the product obtained	solid			pasty	sol. (clinker) liq. (cast iron)
Max. temperature (°C)	600–900	900–1100		1200–1300	1400–1500
Reduction (% O_{2} removed from Fe_{2}O_{3})	12%	20–70	>90		100
Process examples	Air Liquide	Highveld Udy LARCO	RN SL/RN Krupp	Krupp- Renn	Basset

Another distinctive attribute of the procedure involves introducing powdered coal to the furnace outlet. Furthermore, the process has evolved to enable terminating the supply of coal and running exclusively on the coal dust or coke dust introduced with the ore. In this situation, solely combustion air is injected at the furnace outlet. Thermal efficiency is improved in shaft furnaces such as blast furnaces compared to rotary furnaces due to the air absorbing some of the Luppen heat. However, the oxygen in the air partially re-oxidizes the product, meaning that the Luppen is still altered by contact with air at the end or after leaving the furnace, despite complete reduction of iron in the furnace.

The hot assembly is discharged from the furnace and then rapidly cooled and crushed. The iron is separated from the slag via magnetic separation. Magnetically intermediate fines make up 5–15% of the charge. While partial melting of the charge leads to the increased density of the products, it also requires significant energy consumption.

=== Load behavior as it passes through the furnace ===
View of the load in the oven's two active zones

Changes in chemical composition during furnace passage, in the case of saprolite containing ~15% iron and 2.5% nickel

The furnace comprises three distinct zones:

- Firstly, the preheating zone heats the ore to 800 °C using the hot fumes within the furnace. Ore reduction occurs only if temperatures exceed 900-1,000 °C, while the coal releases its most volatile constituents.
- Secondly, the reduction zone is situated in the middle of the furnace, where coal and iron oxides combine to produce carbon monoxide. The carbon monoxide is released from the charge, generating a gaseous layer that shields the charge against the oxidizing air circulating above. As a consequence, this excessive gas is combusted, raising the temperature of the furnace walls, which then transfer the heat back to the charge due to rotary motion. The temperature eventually increases to 800 – 1,200 °C. Subsequently, the iron oxides are gradually altered into ferronickel or metallic iron. The metal produced is in the form of metallic sponge particles that are finely dispersed in the powdery gangue.
- Reduction is complete by the end of the furnace, and there is a minimal amount of CO produced. This is due to the fact that the charge is no longer protected from oxidation by the air blown in at the base of the furnace. As a result, a violent but shallow reoxidation of the iron occurs. Some of the oxidized iron is returned to the core of the charge by rotation where it is further reduced with residual coal. The remaining material mixes with waste to create a thick slag that cannot blend with the produced metal. This extremely hot reaction melts the non-oxidized iron and nickel, which clump together forming nodules named Luppen.

Control of temperature is critical in regards to the ore's physicochemical characteristics. Overly high temperatures or unsuitable granulometry lead to the creation of rings of sintered material that accumulate on the walls of the furnace. Typically, a ring of iron-poor slag, known as slag, is formed at two-thirds of the distance along the furnace. Similarly, a metal ring usually forms around ten meters from the outlet. These rings disturb the flow of materials and gas, diminishing the furnace's useful capacity, sometimes completely obstructing it. The process's revival is hindered by the formation of a ring, particularly in China. In the early 21st century, industrialists abandoned its adoption after recognizing how critical and challenging managing this parameter was.

While slag melting consumes energy, it enables us to govern the charge's behavior in the furnace. Additionally, we need a minimum of 800 to 1,000 kg of slag per ton of iron to prevent Luppen from growing too big. Slag limits coal segregation as coal is much less dense than ore and would float to the surface of the mixture. It transforms into a paste that guards the metal against oxidation when heated and simplifies both Luppen processing and furnace cleaning during maintenance shutdowns through vitrification when it gets cold.

=== Performance with low-grade ores ===
The Krupp–Renn process is suitable for producing pre-reduced iron ore from highly siliceous and acidic ores (CaO/SiO2 basicity index of 0.1 to 0.4), which begin generating a pasty slag at 1,200 °C. Additionally, due to the slag's acidity, it becomes vitreous, facilitating separation from the iron through easy crushing. Furthermore, this process is also ideal for treating ores with high concentrations of titanium dioxide. Due to its ability to cause slag to become especially infusible and viscous, ores that contain this oxide cannot be used with blast furnaces as they must remove all their production in liquid form. For this reason, the preferred ores for this technique are those that would become uneconomical if they had to be modified with basic additives, usually those with a low iron content (between 35 and 51%), and whose gangue needs to be neutralized.

Integrated into a steelmaking complex, the Krupp–Renn process provides an alternative to sinter plants or beneficiation processes, effectively eliminating waste rock and undesired elements like zinc, lead, and tin. In a blast furnace, these elements undergo vaporization-condensation cycles which progressively saturates the furnace. However, with the Krupp–Renn process, the high temperature of the fumes prevents condensation within the furnace, before they are retrieved by the dust-removal system. The process recovers by-products or extracts specific metals. The Luppen is subsequently remelted in either the blast furnace or the cupola furnace, or the Martin-Siemens furnace, because it involves melting a pre-reduced, iron-rich charge.

The process has been effective in treating ores abundant in nickel(II) oxide, vanadium, and other metals. Additionally, the process is applicable in the production of ferronickel. In this instance, saprolitic ores with a high magnesium content are as infusible as highly acidic ores, distinguishing their relevance to the process.

Direct reduction methods such as this one offer the flexibility of using any solid fuel and in this case, 240 to 300 kg of hard coal is needed to process one metric ton of iron ore that contains 30 to 40% iron. Assuming a consumption of 300 kg/ton of ore at 30%, the hard coal consumption is 800 kg per ton of iron. Additionally, 300 kg of coke is consumed during the smelting of Luppen in the blast furnace. When this ore is smelted entirely in the blast furnace, total fuel consumption remains the same. However, it only uses coke, which is a much more expensive fuel than hard coal.

However, using slags with over 60% silica content, making them acidic, contradicts metal desulfurization that demands highly basic slags. Consequently, 30% of the fuel's sulfur settles in the iron, entailing expensive after-treatments to eliminate it. (Note: Sulfur has a strong affinity for iron. However, it is also a generally undesirable alloying element, making both hot and cold iron brittle. It can only be eliminated in a highly basic environment (i.e. in the presence of lime, if not magnesia), whereas the Krupp-Renn process requires an acid slag to achieve good viscosity. Nevertheless, the process's ability to remove undesirable elements through the flue gas makes it a good candidate for pyrite treatment, as it can remove large quantities of sulfur through the flue gas without polluting the slag with this element.)

=== Productivity ===
Depending on the ore and plant size, a furnace can daily output 250 to 800 tons of pre-reduced iron ore. The biggest furnaces, up to 5 meters in diameter and 110 meters long, can process 950 to 1,000 tons of ore daily, excluding fuel. A properly operated plant typically runs for around 300 days per year. The internal refractory typically lasts 7 to 8 months in the most exposed part of the furnace and for 2 years elsewhere. In 1960, a Krupp-Renn furnace using low-grade ore yielded 100 kilotons of iron annually, while a contemporaneous modern blast furnace produced ten times as much cast iron.

Direct reduction processes employing rotary furnaces frequently face a significant challenge due to the localized formation of iron and slag rings, which sinter together and gradually obstruct the furnace. Understanding the mechanism of lining formation is a complex process involving mineralogy, chemical reactions, and ore preparation. The formation of the lining ring, which progressively grows and poisons the furnace, is caused by a few elements in minute quantities. To remedy this, increasing the supply of combustion air or interrupting the furnace charging process are effective solutions. Otherwise, it may be necessary to adjust the grain size of the charged ore.

In 1958, Krupp constructed a plant that could generate 420,000 tons per year of pre-reduced iron ore (consisting of six furnaces) which had an estimated value of 90 million Deutsche Mark, or 21.4 million dollars. By contrast, the plant erected in Salzgitter-Watenstedt in 1956–1957, which was well-integrated with an existing steelworks, only cost 33 million Deutsche Mark. At that time, a Krupp-Renn plant presented itself as a feasible substitute to the established blast furnace process, considering its investment and operating costs: initial investment cost per ton produced was nearly half and operating costs were roughly two and a half times greater.

The slag, a glassy silica, can be effortlessly employed as an additive for constructing road surfaces or concrete. However, the method does not produce a recoverable gas similar to blast furnace gas, decreasing its profitability in most cases. Nevertheless, it also solves the issue regarding gas recovery.

== Plants built ==
Plants built (non-exhaustive list) (Note: Although this list cannot be considered exhaustive, it is fairly consistent with the 65 industrial furnaces listed in the Great Soviet Encyclopedia in the 1970s.) Unless otherwise specified, data are taken from ECSC (1960), UNIDO (1963), and Production étrangère de fer sans haut fourneau (Moscow, 1964) publications.
Number of furnaces	Location	Owner on commissioning	Internal diameter (m)	Length (m)	Capacité (t _{ore}/d)	Commissioning date	Shutdown date	Notes
1	Magdeburg (Germany)	F. Krupp	0,7 (external or internal unknown)	8	2,5	1931	1933	First experimental furnace.
1	Rheinhausen (Germany)	F. Krupp	0,9	14	6	NC	1939	Prototype A evolved to explore the feasibility of a variant of the Krupp–Renn process, the Krupp-Eisenschwamm process.
1	Essen-Borbeck (Germany)	F. Krupp	3,6	50	275–300	1935	1945	Industrial demonstrator. Capacity of 250–280 t/d according to the Soviets. Transferred to the Soviet Union in 1945.
2	Frankenstein (Silesia) Ząbkowice Śląskie (Poland)	F. Krupp Zakłady Górniczo-Hutnicze „Szklary”	3,6	50	2 × 250–280 2 × 275–300	1935 and 1941 1950–1953	1945 1982	Transferred to the Soviet Union in 1945, then rebuilt by the Poles to idenque. (Note: An isolated source mentions the rebuilding of 3 furnaces, instead of 2.) Garnierite processing (9% iron, 61% SiO_{2} and 0.73% nickel).
4 4	Anshan (Manchuko)	Aciéries Shōwa Anshan I&S	3,6	60	4 × 60 8 × 300	1939 1948	1945 NC	6 additional furnaces ordered but never installed because of the war. Transferred to the Soviet Union after the war. Rebuilt identically in 1948 with 4 additional furnaces. Ore containing 35–36% Fe and 40–48% SiO_{2}.
4 (Note: Some sources list 4 furnaces built before 1945 (Soviet and Japanese sources), while others list 6 (Barrett, etc.). Akira Kudo, who precisely dates the start of each 4-oven campaign, seems to have the best information.) 2 1	Chongjin (North Korea) (Note: In 1971, the CIA identified two North Korean steel plants using the Krupp-Renn process: the Kimch'aek plant, equipped with 6 furnaces before 1960 and supplemented by 2 additional furnaces around 1970, and the Posan steel plant, where 4 furnaces were built between 1969 and 1971. No furnaces have been identified at Seishin.)	Mitsubishi Shoji Kaisha	3,6	60	4 × 300	1939 1945-195 before 1964	1945 NC	Transferred to the Soviet Union after the war. 7 furnaces in 1964. Magnetite containing 55–60% Fe, or limonite containing 46–52% Fe.
2 (Note: The characteristics of these furnaces differ according to the source: Barrett identifies a furnace 1 m in diameter and 8 m long in operation before 194542, the Soviets list 2 furnaces 1.1 m in diameter and 25 m long still in operation in 196438 and Akira Kudo indicates 2 furnaces 1.8 m in diameter and 15 and 25 m long producing 8 t/d of iron, i.e. consuming some 20 tonnes of ore daily. His information has been retained)	Kuji (Japan)	Kawasaki Dockyard	1,8 1,8	25 15	20 (est.) (Note: The characteristics of these furnaces differ according to the source: Barrett identifies a furnace 1 m in diameter and 8 m long in operation before 194542, the Soviets list 2 furnaces 1.1 m in diameter and 25 m long still in operation in 196438 and Akira Kudo indicates 2 furnaces 1.8 m in diameter and 15 and 25 m long producing 8 t/d of iron, i.e. consuming some 20 tonnes of ore daily. His information has been retained)	1939	between 1964 and 1967	Reconverted small drying kilns. Kilns shut down in 1945 and restarted in 1949.
4	Ōeyama (Japan)	Nihon Yakin Kogyo	3,6	70	500–600	1940–1942	1945	Nickel-bearing iron ore.
1 2	Nanao (Japan)	Iwaki Cement Co	3,45 3,45	88 (Note: Soviet sources give kilns with a diameter of 3 m, one with a length of 92.3 m and 2 with a diameter of 3 m and a length of 73.5 m.) 73	3 × 70,7	1940	NC	Modified cement kilns. Ore containing 26% Fe, 24–29% SiO_{2}, 0.6% Ni, 1.4% Cr. In operation in 1964 according to Soviet sources.
1	Onishi (Japan)	Nippon Nickel Co	2,8	50	60	circa 1940	NC	Luppen contains 1.3% Ni and 0.6% Cr.
2	Hirai (Japan)	Riken Industrial Corp. (Note: It is difficult to say how the Hirai furnace, run by a research institute, was operated stably with the Krupp-Renn process, even though Barett counts it as such, as well as the small furnaces at Fushun and Onishi.)	2,3	38	2 × 36	circa 1940	NC	Mixture of local and imported limonitic ores. Luppen contains 1.7% Ni and 2.1% Cr.
2	Fushun (Manchuko)	Aciéries Shōwa	3,0	60	2 × 60	circa 1940	NC	Magnetite.
2	Kuji (Japan)	Kawasaki Heavy Industries	3,6	60	2 × 300	1941	1967	Furnaces shut down in 1945 and restarted in 1957–59. Ore containing 34–35% Fe and 5–8% TiO_{2}.
1 2	Králův Dvůr (Czech Republic)	Králodvorských železárnách Hrudkovny Praha	3,6	60	3 × 300–325	1943 (Note: The ECSC attributes the commissioning of the 1st furnace to Thyssen in 1943, while the Soviets present the 3 furnaces as post-1945. The ECSC version is generally accepted.) circa 1955	circa 1966	Ore containing 30–35% Fe and 24% SiO_{2} (pelosiderite + chamosite + hematite).
3	Salzgitter-Watenstedt (Germany)	F. Krupp	4,2	70	3 × 500	1943–1945 (Note: However, an article in Der Spiegel reports the use of direct reduction plants on this site as early as 1937, by the Reichswerke Hermann Göring in Watenstedt.)	1950	Given as war reparations in 1950. Ore containing 25–30% Fe.
2	Ōeyama (Japan)	Nihon Yakin Kogyo	3,6	70	500–600	1952	in service (2014)	Nickel-rich saprolite (>2.5% Ni) imported from New Caledonia. The original process has been extensively modified, and Luppen contains 18–22% Ni.
2	Unterwellenborn (GDR)	VEB Maxhütte Unterwellenborn	3,6	60	2 × 300 – 400	1953	1968	Chamosite and siliceous limonite. Mixture containing 33% iron, 10.5% Al_{2}O_{3} and 27% SiO_{2}. In 1957, plans to build a 3rd furnace, never realized.
1 2 (Note: In 1960, the ECSC mentions a furnace with a diameter of 3.6 m and a length of 60 m, plus another planned at 4.2 m × 70 m. In 1963, UNIDO lists two furnaces in operation: 3.6 m × 40 m and 4.2 m × 90 m. Finally, in 1964, Soviet sources mention 2 furnaces of 4.6 m × 70 m, in addition to the 1954 furnace. The latter information has been retained.)	Avilés (Spain)	Siderúrgica Asturiana, S. A.	3,6 4,6 (Note: In 1960, the ECSC mentions a furnace with a diameter of 3.6 m and a length of 60 m, plus another planned at 4.2 m × 70 m. In 1963, UNIDO lists two furnaces in operation: 3.6 m × 40 m and 4.2 m × 90 m. Finally, in 1964, Soviet sources mention 2 furnaces of 4.6 m × 70 m, in addition to the 1954 furnace. The latter information has been retained.)	60 70 (Note: In 1960, the ECSC mentions a furnace with a diameter of 3.6 m and a length of 60 m, plus another planned at 4.2 m × 70 m. In 1963, UNIDO lists two furnaces in operation: 3.6 m × 40 m and 4.2 m × 90 m. Finally, in 1964, Soviet sources mention 2 furnaces of 4.6 m × 70 m, in addition to the 1954 furnace. The latter information has been retained.)	250–275 NC	1954 circa 1960	1971	Hematite containing 30–40% Fe and 20–30% SiO_{2}.
3	Mníšek (Czech Republic)	Kovohutě Mníšek	3,6	60	3 × 300–350	circa 1954	1967	Ore containing 30–35% Fe and 24% SiO_{2} (pelosiderite + chamosite + hematite).
10	Ejpovice (Czech Republic)	RND Ejpovice	3,6	60	10 × 300–350	1956	1966	Over the period, 2.827 Mt of 82–83% iron Luppen were produced, from ore containing 30–35% Fe and 24% SiO_{2} (pelosiderite + chamosite + hematite).
1 (Note: A 2nd furnace, measuring 4.6 m × 110 m, was also built, but the Krupp-Renn process was abandoned before it was commissioned.)	Lárymna (Greece)	Hellenic Company of Chemical Products & Fertilizers Ltd.	4,2	90	400	1956	1963	Ore containing 35% Fe and 1.5–1.75% Ni, Luppen contains 4% nickel. Technical failure: adoption of the LM process in 1963, followed by the Larco process in 1966 to transfer the pre-reduced smelting process to an electric furnace.
2 2	Salzgitter-Watenstedt (FRG)	Rennanlage Salzgitter-Ruhr GbR.	4,2 4,6	95 110	2,000	1956 1957 and 1960	1963	Siliceous Harz ore containing 28–34% Fe.
2 1	Sabinów k. Częstochowy (Poland)	Zakłady Górniczo-Hutnicze „Sabinów”	3,6 4,2	60 70	340 and 360 460	1958	1971	Siderite containing 31–33% Fe27 and 25% SiO_{2}. The difference in productivity between the first two furnaces is due to their inclination (2° and 3° respectively).
1	Minnesota (United States)	South Western Engineering	2,7	53,4	NC	1959	circa 1962	Pilot plant built under license from Krupp to assess the value of the Mesabi Range deposit: 12,000 t of ore were transformed into 5,000 t of Luppen. Ore containing 47% Fe and 18% Ti_{2}O_{2}.
1 1	Novotroïtsk (USSR)	Combinat Métallurgique d'Orsk-Khalilovo	3,6	60	2 × 250–300	1960 1963–1973	NC	Ackerman limonite (Khabarninsky) containing 32–45% Fe, 1.26% Cr and 0.52% Ni, or Orsk-Khalilovo limonite containing 18% Fe, 0.6–1.16% Cr. SiO_{2} and Al_{2}O_{3} gangue. Each furnace produces 55–60 t/d of Luppen containing 1.2–2.3% Ni and 0.4–0.9% Cr.
2 1	St. Egidien (GDR)	VEB St. Egidien	4,2	90 (Note: In 1960, the ECSC gave these two furnaces a length of 100 m. Other Soviet sources were consistent with a length of 90 m, and were therefore preferred.)	NC	december 1960 1974	1990	Intended for processing hydrated nickel silicates. 4 furnaces initially planned, 3rd added around 1974. Ore containing 11% Fe and 0.84% Ni, Luppen contains 5.8% Ni.
3	Zębiec k. Iłży (Poland)	Zakłady Górniczo-Hutnicze 'Zębiec'	4,2	95	580	1965	1970	Iron sand containing 15% Fe.

== Heritage ==
=== Evolution ===
In view of its performance, the process seemed a suitable basis for the development of more efficient variants. Around 1940, the Japanese built several small reduction furnaces operating at lower temperatures: one at Tsukiji (1.8 m × 60 m), two at Hachinohe (2 furnaces of 2.8 m × 50 m), and three at Takasago (2 furnaces of 1.83 m × 27 m and 1 furnace of 1.25 m × 17 m). However, since they do not produce Luppen, they cannot be equated with the Krupp–Renn process.

Although direct reduction in a rotary furnace has been the subject of numerous developments, the logical descendant of the Krupp–Renn process is the "Krupp-CODIR process". Developed in the 1970s, it is based on the general principles of the Krupp–Renn process with a lower temperature reduction, typically between 950 and 1,050 °C, which saves fuel but is insufficient to achieve partial melting of the charge. The addition of basic corrective additives (generally limestone or dolomite) mixed with the ore allows the removal of sulfur from the coal, although the thermolysis of these additives is highly endothermic. This process has been adopted by three plants: 'Dunswart Iron & Steel Works' in South Africa in 1973, 'Sunflag Iron and Steel' in 1989, and 'Goldstar Steel & Alloy' in India in 1993. Although the industrial application is now well established, the process has not had the impact of its predecessor.

Finally, there are many post-Krupp-Renn direct reduction processes based on a tubular rotary furnace. At the beginning of the 21st century, their combined output represented between 1% and 2% of world steel production. In 1935 and 1960, the output of the Krupp–Renn process (1 and 2 million tons respectively) represented just under 1% of world steel production.

=== Treatment of ferrous by-products ===
The Krupp–Renn process, which specialized in the beneficiation of poor ores, was the logical basis for the development of recycling processes for ferrous by-products. In 1957, Krupp tested a furnace at Stürzelberg (Note: This Stürzelberg furnace should not be confused with the "Stürzelberg process", a tilting rotary reduction-melting furnace invented in the same town.) for the treatment of roasted pyrites to extract iron (in the form of Luppen) and zinc (vaporized in the flue gases). This process is therefore a hybrid of the Waelz and Krupp–Renn processes, which is why it is called the "Krupp-Waelz" (or "Renn-Waelz") process. The trials were limited to a single 2.75 m × 40 m demonstrator capable of processing 70 to 80 t/day and were not followed up.

The technical relationship between Krupp-Renn and Japanese direct reduction production processes is often cited. In the 1960s, Japanese steelmakers, sharing the observation that furnace plugging was difficult to control, developed their own low-temperature variants of the Krupp–Renn process. Kawasaki Steel commissioned a direct-reduction furnace at its Eastern Japan steel plant (1968) and Western Japan steel plant (1975) plants, the most visible feature of which was a pelletizing unit for the site's steelmaking by-products (sludge and dust from the cleaning of converter and blast furnace gases). The "Kawasaki process" also incorporates other developments, such as the combustion of oil instead of pulverized coal (Note: Hydrocarbons, although more expensive, are easier to burn and enrich the reducing gas with hydrogen.) and the use of coke powder instead of coal mixed with ore... Almost identical to the Kawasaki process (with a more elaborate pelletizing unit), the "Koho process" was adopted by Nippon Steel, which commissioned a plant of this type at the Muroran steelworks in 1971.

=== The Ōeyama process ===
Principle diagram of the "Oheyama process"

The production of ferronickel from laterites takes place in a context that is much more favorable to the Krupp–Renn process than to the steel industry. Lateritic ores in the form of saprolite are poor, very basic and contain iron. Production volumes are moderate, and the nickel chemistry is remarkably amenable to rotary kiln reduction. The process is therefore attractive, but regardless of the metal extracted, mastering all the physical and chemical transformations in a single reactor is a real challenge. The failure of the Larco plant at Lárymna Greece, illustrates the risk involved in adopting this process: it was only when the ore was ready for industrial processing that it proved incompatible with the Krupp–Renn process.

As a result, lower-temperature reduction followed by electric furnace smelting allows each stage to have its own dedicated tool for greater simplicity and efficiency. Developed in 1950 at Koniambo in New Caledonia, this combination has proven to be both cost-effective and, above all, more robust. Large rotating drums (5 m in diameter and 100 m or even 185 m long) are used to produce a dry powder from nickel ore concentrate. This powder contains 1.5 to 3% nickel. It leaves the drum at 800–900 °C and is immediately melted in electric furnaces. Only partial reduction takes place in the drums: a quarter of the nickel comes out in metallic form, the rest is still oxidized. Only 5% of the iron is reduced to metal, leaving unburned coal as fuel for the subsequent melting stage in the electric furnace. This proven process (also known as the RKEF process, for Rotary Kiln-Electric Furnace) has become the norm: at the beginning of the 21st century, it accounted for almost all nickel laterite processing.

In the early 21st century, however, the Nihon Yakin Kogyo foundry in Ōeyama, Japan, continued to use the Krupp–Renn process to produce intermediate grade ferronickel (23% nickel), sometimes called nickel pig iron. With a monthly output of 1,000 tons of Luppen and a production capacity of 13 kt/year, the plant is operating at full capacity. It is the only plant in the world using this process. It is also the only plant using a direct reduction process to extract nickel from laterite. The process, which has been significantly upgraded, is called the "Ōeyama process".

The Ōeyama process differs from the Krupp–Renn process in the use of limestone and the briquetting of the ore prior to charging. It retains its advantages, which are the concentration of all pyrometallurgical reactions in a single reactor and the use of standard (i.e. non-coking) coal, which covers 90% of the energy requirements of the process. Coal consumption is only 140 kg per ton of dry laterite, (Note: This consumption of 140 kg/t of coal can be compared with the 240 kg of coke and 200 kg of coal that a good modern blast furnace consumes to produce one tonne of cast iron from rich iron ores.) and the quality of the ferronickel obtained is compatible with direct use by the steel industry. Although marginal, the Krupp–Renn process remains a modern, high-capacity process for the production of nickel pig iron. In this context, it remains a systematically studied alternative to the RKEF process and the "sinter plant-blast furnace" combination.

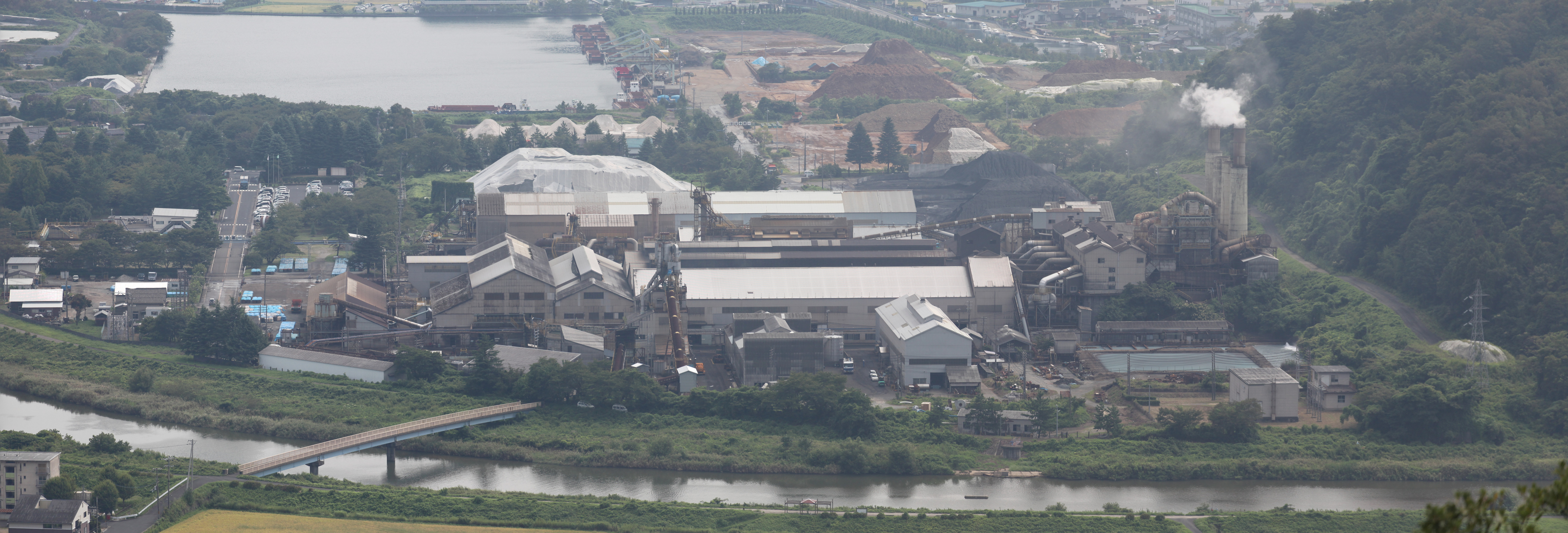
Nihon Yakin Kogyo's Ōeyama (Japan) plant in 2012. This is the last plant to employ the Krupp-Renn process in nickel extraction.

== See also ==
- Direct reduction
- Direct reduced iron
- fr:Histoire de la production de l'acier
- fr:Friedrich Johannsen
