= Tatara (furnace) =

Traditional Japanese furnace used to smelt iron and steel

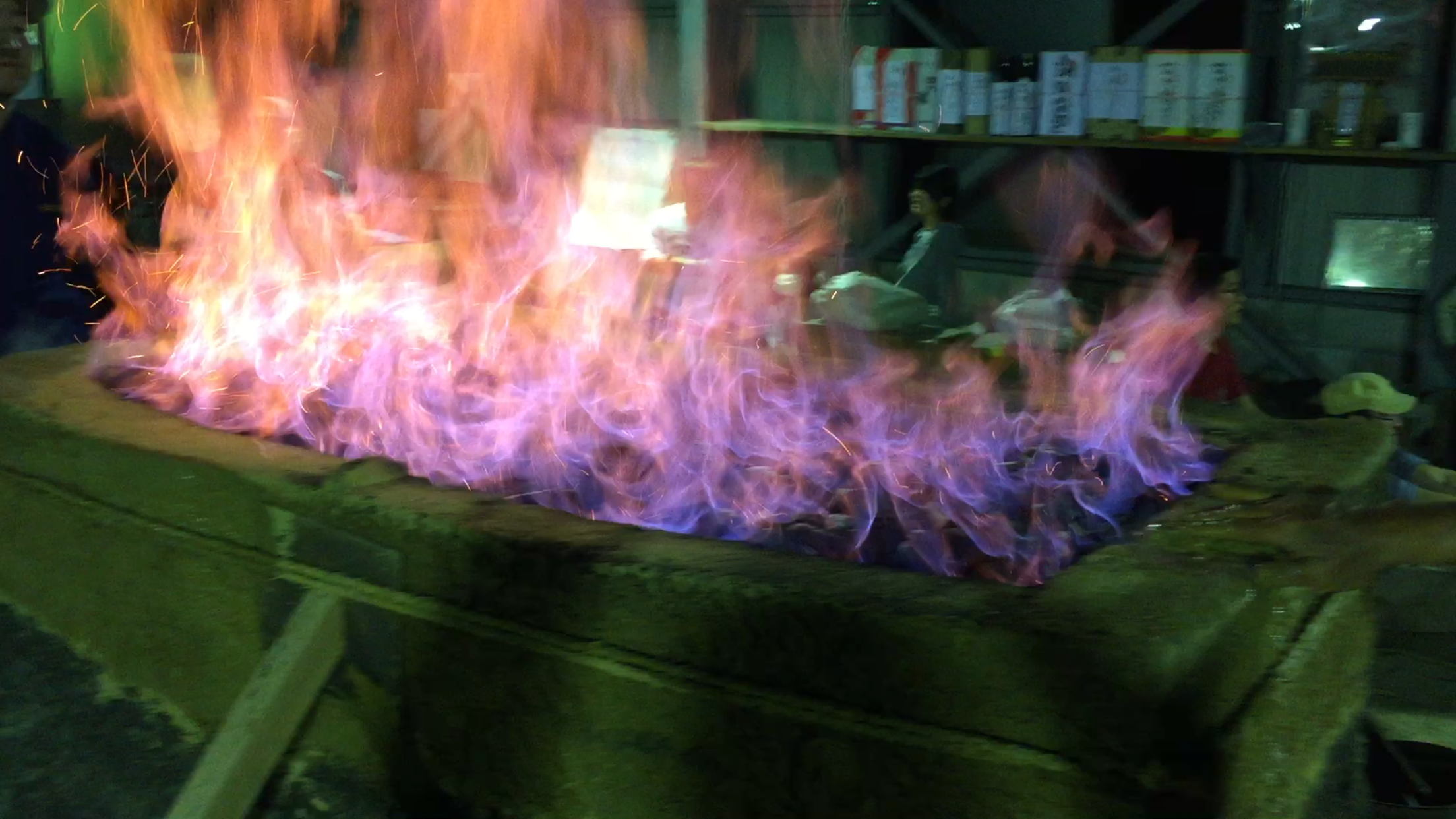
Charcoal is added to a clay Tatara furnace in Niimi, Okayama until a temperature of over 800 °C is achieved.

The tatara (鑪) is a traditional Japanese furnace used for smelting iron and steel. The word later also came to mean the entire building housing the furnace. The traditional steel in Japan comes from ironsand processed in a special way, called the tatara system.

Iron ore was used in the first steel manufacturing in Japan. Tatara steelmaking process using ironsand was conducted in the Kibi Province, which later became the base of the Bizen school of swordsmithing, around the middle of the sixth century, and steelmaking using ironsand is thought to have spread from Kibi to various places in Japan. In western Japan, a low box-shaped furnace different from the Chinese and Korean style was used to refine iron, and in eastern Japan, both a low box-shaped furnace and a vertical furnace unique to Japan were used.

In the Middle Ages, furnaces were enlarged to produce more steel of higher quality, and underground facilities were also huge and complicated to keep the furnace warm and reduce humidity. In addition, a new method of collecting ironsand, called kanna nagashi (鉄穴流), which can efficiently collect more ironsand using waterways, was adopted.

In the Edo period, tatara steelmaking was further improved and became the same as today's tatara steelmaking in Japan. Tatara steelmaking came to be carried out in a stereotyped building called takadono (高殿), and a space called Hondoko (本床), where charcoal is laid, and a space called Kobune (小舟), which has a tunnel-like gap, were installed under the steelmaking furnace, completing the underground structure known as Hondoko zuri (本床釣り). In the late 1600s, tatara steelmaking adopted a revolutionary invention. It is a foot-operated blower called a tembin fuigo (天秤鞴), which can blow a large amount of air into the furnace to increase the temperature. As a result, high quality steel can be produced in large quantities.

By 1920, Tatara Furnaces were no longer economically viable and they closed once the Western blast furnace was introduced to Japan. In 1977, the Society for Preservation of Japanese Art Swords and historical firearms (Nihon Bijutsu Token Hozon Kyokai) with the approval of the Japanese government's department of the environment built a tatara furnace to make Japanese swords.

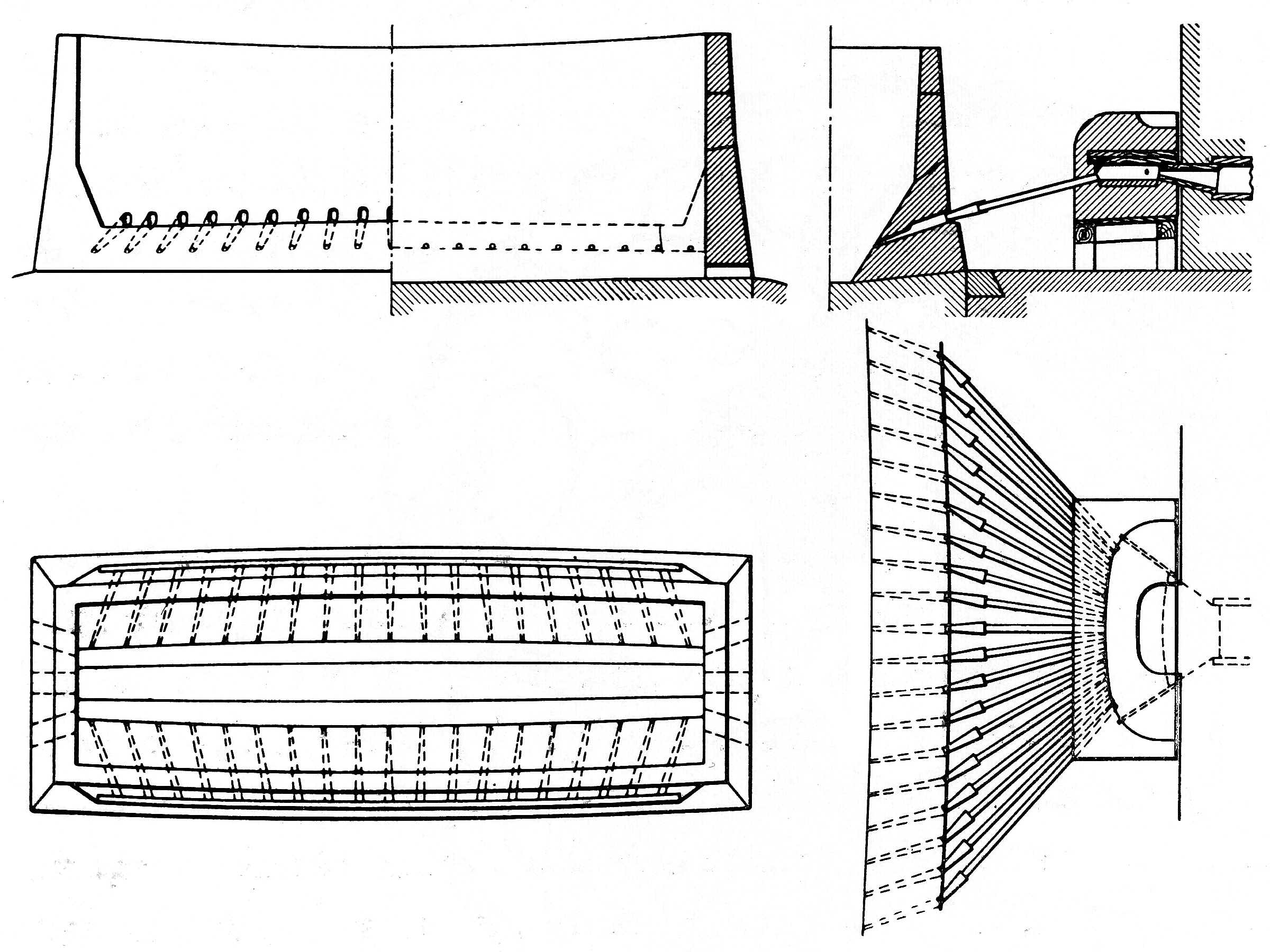
Engineering drawing of a Japanese Tatara-furnace

Tamahagane (玉鋼) is a general term for steel, not used prior to the Meiji Era, literally meaning "precious steel". Steel is smelted at Shimane facility for Japanese swords (nihontō (日本刀), commonly known as katana (刀)) by contemporary Japanese forge masters like Kihara Akira and Gassan Sadatoshi is still smelted in a tatara. One of the few remaining tatara is the Nittoho tatara in Shimane Prefecture, Japan.

== Etymology ==
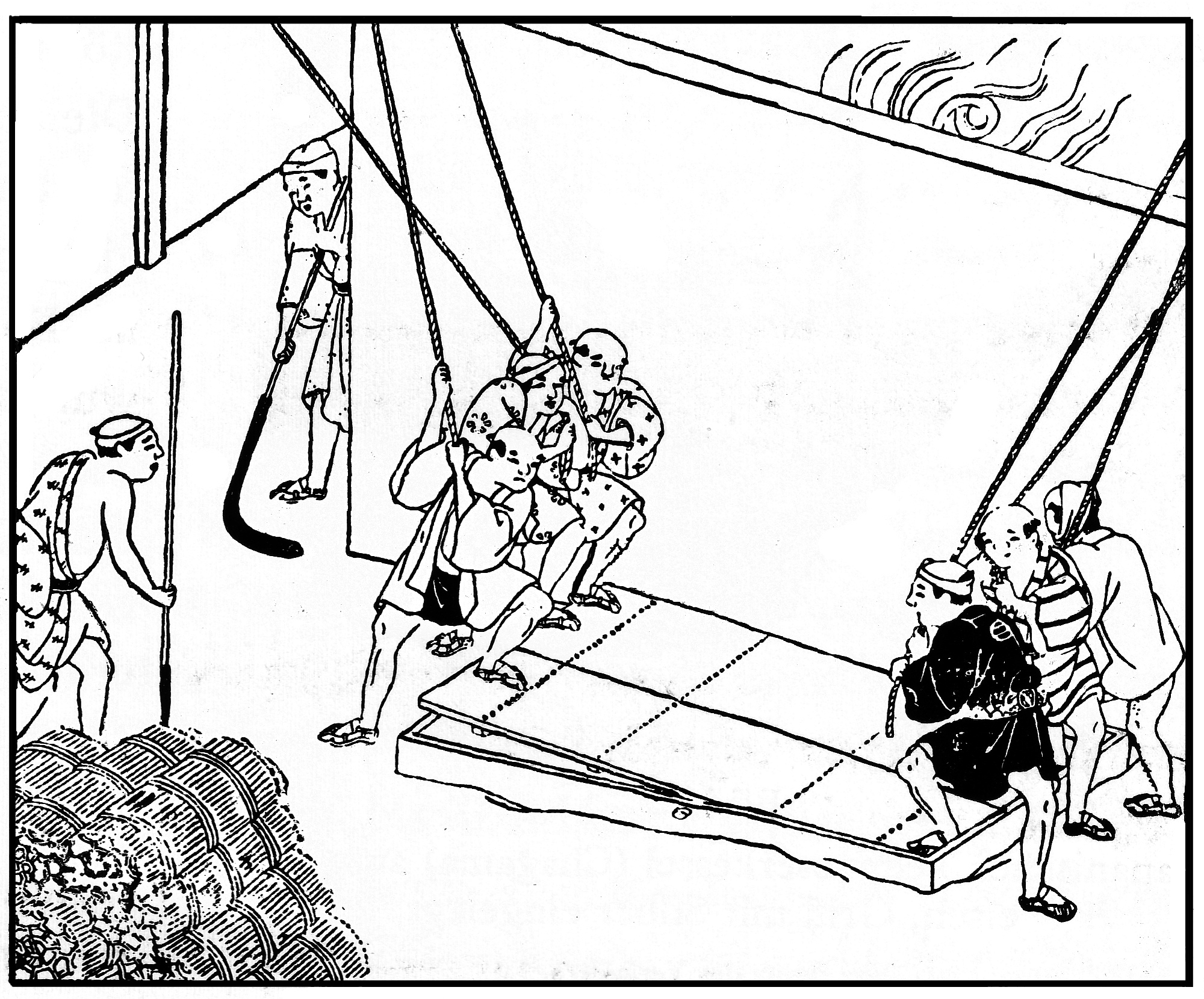
Working the bellows of a Tatara.

The term 'tatara' first appeared in Kojiki compiled in 712 as Hototarara Isusukihime no Mikoto (富登多々良伊須々岐比売命) and in Nihonshoki compiled in 720 as Himetatara Isuzuhime no Mikoto (姫蹈鞴五十鈴姫命), and these words represent Shinto kami. Historically, several kanji characters have been used to express the term 'tatara,' and in ancient times, '蹈鞴', which represents a fan, was used, and as time went by, '鑪', which represents the whole steel works, and '高殿', which represents the buildings of steel works, were also used. Today, the term 'tatara' is applied to steelmaking technology using ironsand, which flourished from ancient times to the Edo period.

== Process ==
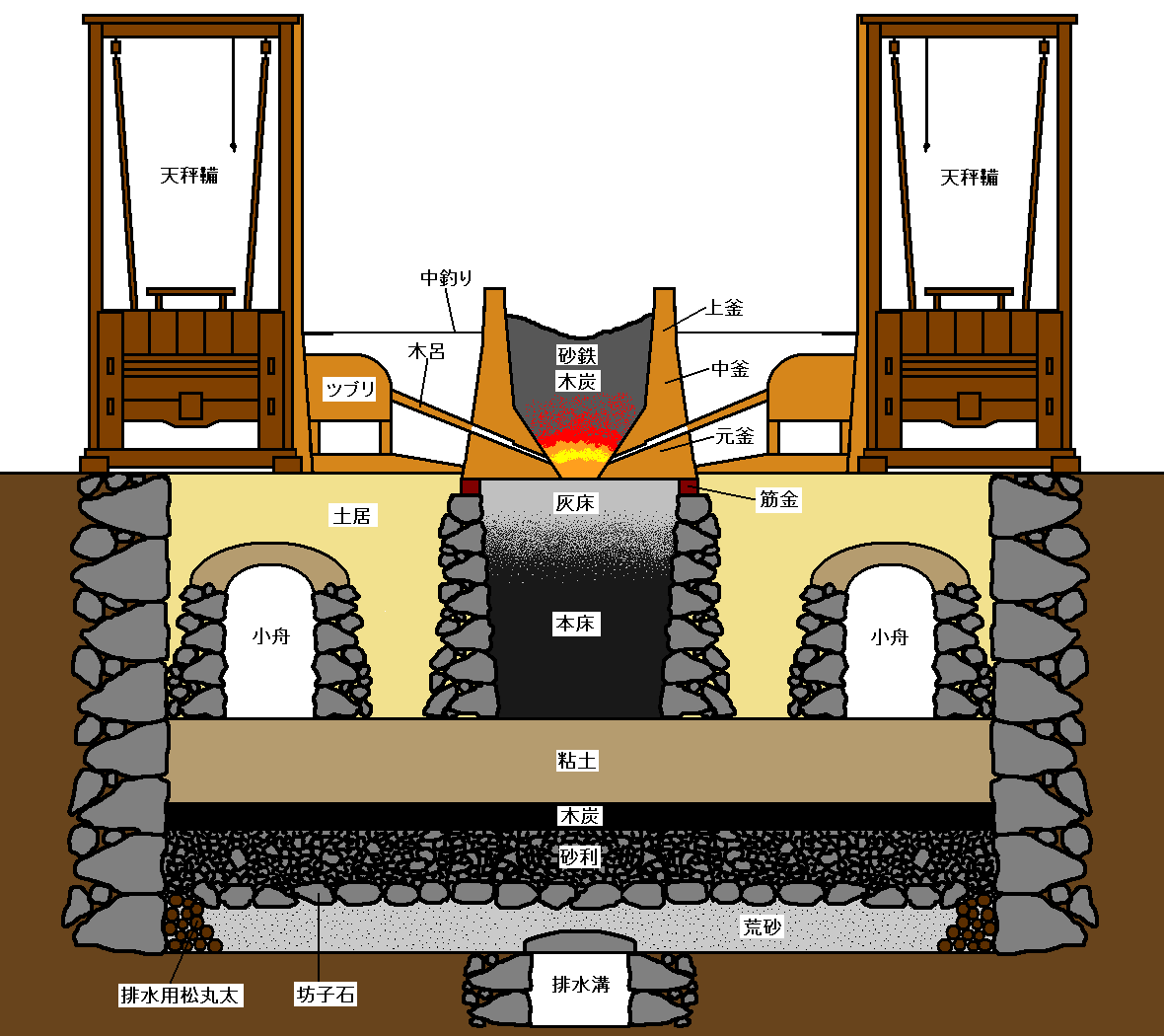
The structure of a tatara. On the two sides of the furnace are visible two bellows. This structure was completed in the 1600s during the Edo period.

The smelting process used differs from that of the modern mass production of steel. A clay vessel about 1.1 meters (3.6 feet) tall, 3 meters (9.8 feet) long, and 1.1 meters (3.6 feet) wide is constructed. This is the tatara. After the clay tub has dried, it is fired until dry. A charcoal fire is started from soft pine charcoal, then the smelter will wait for the fire to reach the correct temperature. At that point, he will direct the addition of ironsand, known as satetsu. This will be layered in with more charcoal and more ironsand over the next 72 hours. Four or five people need to constantly work on this process.

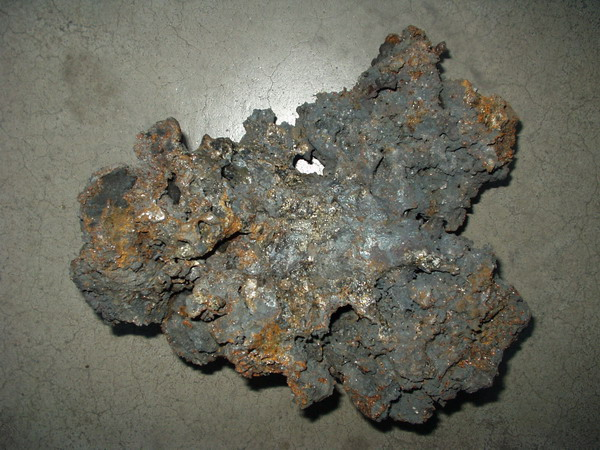
Tamahagane, which is used to forge the blade of traditionally made Japanese blade nihonto.

It takes about a week to build the tatara and complete the iron conversion to steel. When the process is done, the clay tub is broken and the steel bloom, known as a kera, is removed. At the end of the process, the tatara will have consumed about 9.1 t (9.0 long tons; 10.0 short tons) of satetsu and 11 t (11 long tons; 12 short tons) of charcoal, leaving about 2.3 t (2.3 long tons; 2.5 short tons) of tamahagane.

== The Nittoho Tatara ==
In 1977, the Japanese Society for Preservation of Japanese Art Swords (Nittoho), together with the Japanese government's Agency for Cultural Affairs and Hitachi Works subsidiary Yasugi Special Steel, built in Shimane Prefecture the so-named Nittoho Tatara to provide the steel necessary for the production of Japanese swords and historical firearms. The Nittoho Tatara is managed by Yasugi Works, and is operational only during the winter months.

== See also ==
- Japanese swordsmithing
- Bloomery furnace
- Direct reduction
- Direct reduction (blast furnace)

== Sources ==
- Iwanami Kōjien (広辞苑) Japanese dictionary, 5th Edition (2000), CD version
- The Tale of the Tatara, Hitachi Metals, Ltd.
- The Nittoho Tatara in Shimane Prefecture, YouTube.
- thejapanesesword.com Tatara
- Masaru Fujimoto Weapons of Wonder, The Japan Times, March 16, 2003.
