= HDRI =

HDRI may stand for:

- High dynamic range imaging
- Hot direct reduced iron, a form of iron
