= Tamahagane =

Type of steel made in the Japanese tradition

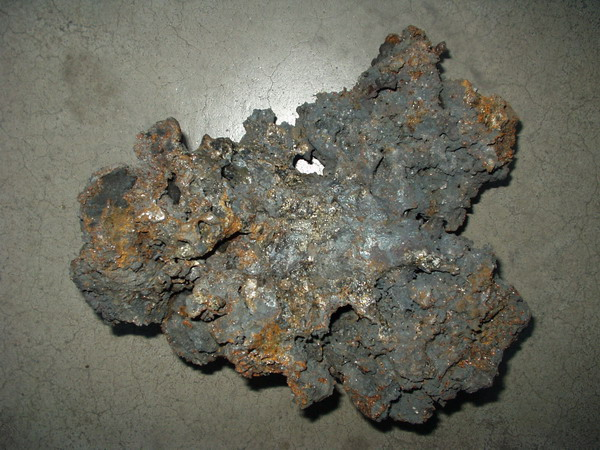
Tamahagane

Tamahagane (玉鋼) is a type of steel made in the Japanese tradition. The word tama means 'precious', and the word hagane means 'steel'. Tamahagane is used to make Japanese swords, daggers, knives, and other kinds of tools.

The carbon content of the majority of analyzed Japanese swords historically lies between a mass of 0.5–0.7%; however, the range extends up to 1.5%.

== Production ==
Tamahagane is made from an iron sand (satetsu) found in Shimane Prefecture of Japan. There are two main types of iron sands: akame satetsu (赤目砂鉄) and masa satetsu (真砂砂鉄). Akame is lower quality, masa is better quality. The murage (furnace master) decides the amount of the mixing parts. Depending on the desired result, the murage mixes one or more types of sands.

The iron sand is put in a tatara, a clay tub furnace. The clay tub measures about 4 feet (1.2 m) tall, 12 feet (3.7 m) long and 4 feet (1.2 m) wide. The tub is dried and heated to about 1,000 °C (1,830 °F). The iron sand is then mixed with charcoal to add carbon to the steel, allowing it to be hardened.

The process of making tamahagane takes 36–72 hours (a day and a half to three days), depending on how many people work and how much metal is to be produced. Within an hour of smelting, the iron sand sinks to the bottom, called the bed of fire, in which it will be assessed by color to determine which parts of the smelt will be combined into tamahagane. The iron sand is added every ten minutes, and the mixture is frequently turned over.

After the tamahagane is finished, the clay tub is broken and the steel is removed. The best steel is on the edges of the resulting metal block; in this area, the oxidation process is stronger. The quality of tamahagane is determined by its color: bright silver pieces are very good for making blades.

== See also ==
- Bloomery
- Bulat steel
- Crucible steel
- Damascus steel
- Japanese swordsmithing
- Katana
- Noric steel
- Pig iron
- Toledo steel
- Wootz steel
