= Larco =

Family name

Larco is an Italian surname.

== US Immigration ==
Between 1860 and 1948, most immigrants named Larco came from Peru, France, and Italy. Many of them sailed across the Atlantic Ocean on the Santa Elisa. Most Larco immigrants to the U.S. arrived in 1929 with New York City being the most popular arrival destination with records of 110 immigrants. Based on the 2002 United States White Pages, the Larco surname is ranked 113,592 out of 1,778,655 total unique surnames.

== People with the surname ==
- Rafael Larco Hoyle (b. 1901), Peruvian Archaeologist
- Guillermo Larco Cox (b. 1932), Peruvian Civil Engineer and Politician
- José Larco (1830–1900), Italian businessman, diplomat and philanthropist
- Luis T. Larco, Peruvian Politician
- Michael Angelo Larco (b. 1977), Violist with Los Angeles Philharmonic

== Other ==
- Larco Museum, also known as Museo Larco. Peruvian museum of pre-Columbian civilizations in Lima
- LARCO, a metallurgical company in Greece
