= Pig iron =

Iron alloy

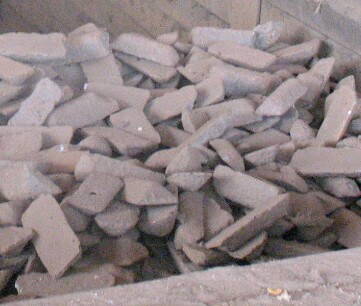
Pig iron used to manufacture ductile iron

Pig iron is an intermediate good used by the iron industry in the production of steel. It is developed by smelting iron ore in a blast furnace. Pig iron has a high carbon content, typically 3.8–4.7%, along with silica and other dross, which makes it brittle and not useful directly as a material except for limited applications.

== Etymology ==
The traditional shape of the molds used for pig iron ingots is a branching structure formed in sand, with many individual ingots at right angles to a central channel or "runner", resembling a litter of piglets being nursed by a sow. When the metal had cooled and hardened, the smaller ingots (the "pigs") were simply broken from the runner (the "sow"), hence the name "pig iron". As pig iron is intended for remelting, the uneven size of the ingots and the inclusion of small amounts of sand are insignificant when compared to the ease of casting and handling.

== History ==
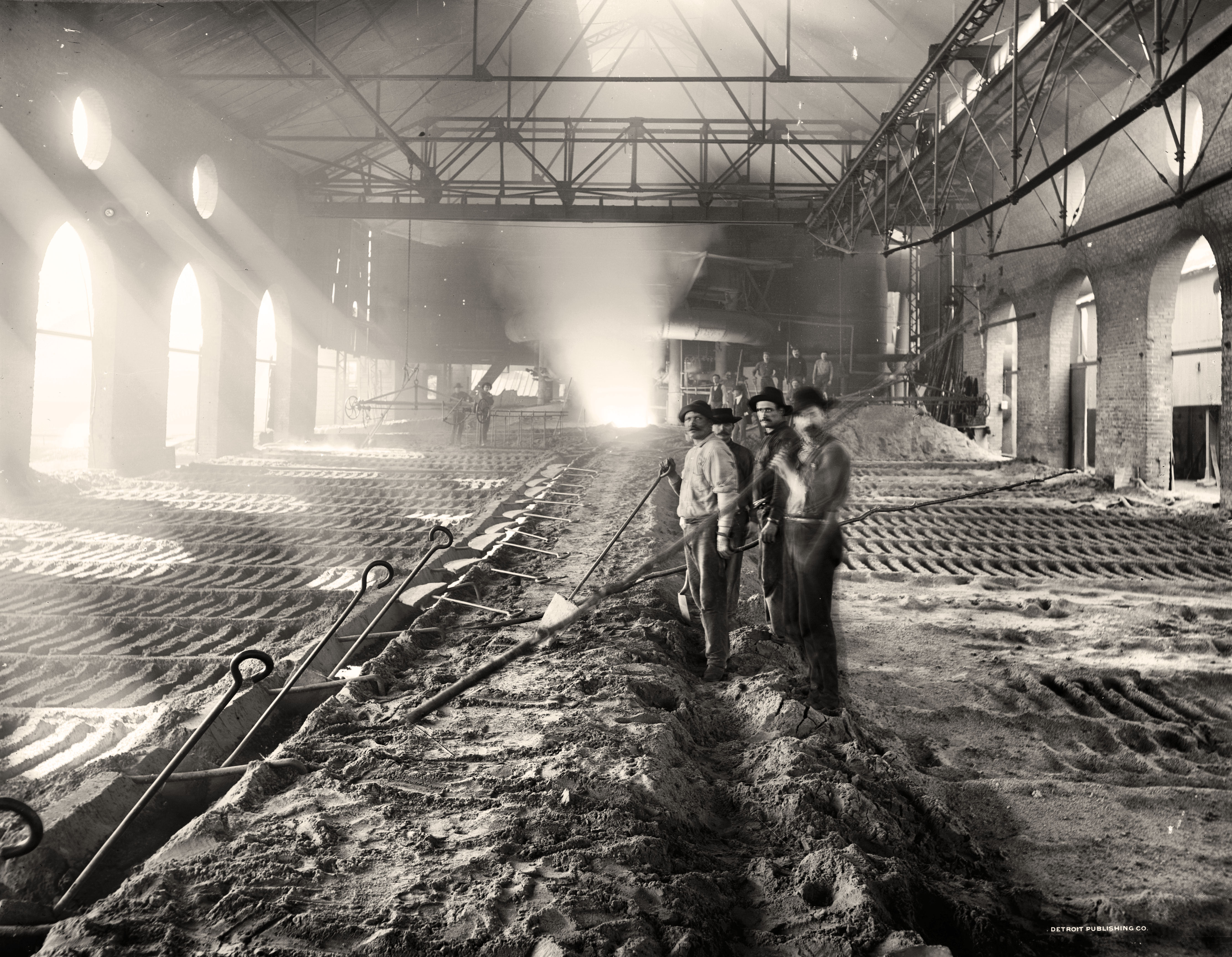
Casting pig iron at the Iroquois smelter in Chicago between 1890 and 1901

Pig iron was made in China by the later Zhou dynasty (ended 256 BC), with the earliest archaeologically confirmed Chinese blast furnaces dating to the Han dynasty. In Europe, blast furnaces producing pig iron appeared during the Middle Ages; Early European blast furnaces are known from Sweden, Germany, and Italy during the 12th and 13th centuries.

Smelting and production of wrought iron were practiced in ancient Europe and the Middle East using direct-reduction bloomery furnaces. Such furnaces could also produce small amounts of high-carbon or molten iron unintentionally, but the intended product was a solid, malleable iron bloom. Pig iron could not be forged directly and instead had to be refined by decarburization before it could be worked.

== Uses ==
Traditionally, pig iron was worked into wrought iron in finery forges, later puddling furnaces, and more recently, it is worked into steel. In these processes, pig iron is melted and a strong current of air is directed over it while it is stirred or agitated. This causes the dissolved impurities (such as silicon) to be thoroughly oxidized. An intermediate product of puddling is known as refined pig iron, finers metal, or refined iron.

Pig iron can also be used to produce gray iron. This is achieved by remelting pig iron, often along with substantial quantities of steel and scrap iron, removing undesirable contaminants, adding alloys, and adjusting the carbon content. Ductile iron can also be produced using certain high purity grades of pig iron; depending on the grade of ductile iron being produced, the pig irons chosen may be low in the elements silicon, manganese, sulfur and phosphorus. High purity pig iron is used to dilute any elements in a ductile iron charge which may be harmful to the ductile iron process (except carbon).

=== Modern uses ===
Pig iron was historically poured directly out of the bottom of the blast furnace through a channel into a ladle car for transfer to the steel mill in mostly liquid form; in this state, the pig iron was referred to as hot metal. The hot metal was then poured into a steelmaking vessel to produce steel, typically an electric arc furnace, induction furnace or basic oxygen furnace, where the excess carbon is burned off and the alloy composition controlled. Earlier processes for this included the finery forge, the puddling furnace, the Bessemer process, and the open hearth furnace.

Modern steel mills and direct-reduction iron plants transfer the molten iron to a ladle for immediate use in the steel making furnaces or cast it into pigs on a pig-casting machine for reuse or resale. Modern pig casting machines produce stick pigs, which break into smaller 4–10-kilogram (9–22 lb) piglets at discharge.
