= Direct reduced iron =

Iron metal made from ore without a blast furnace

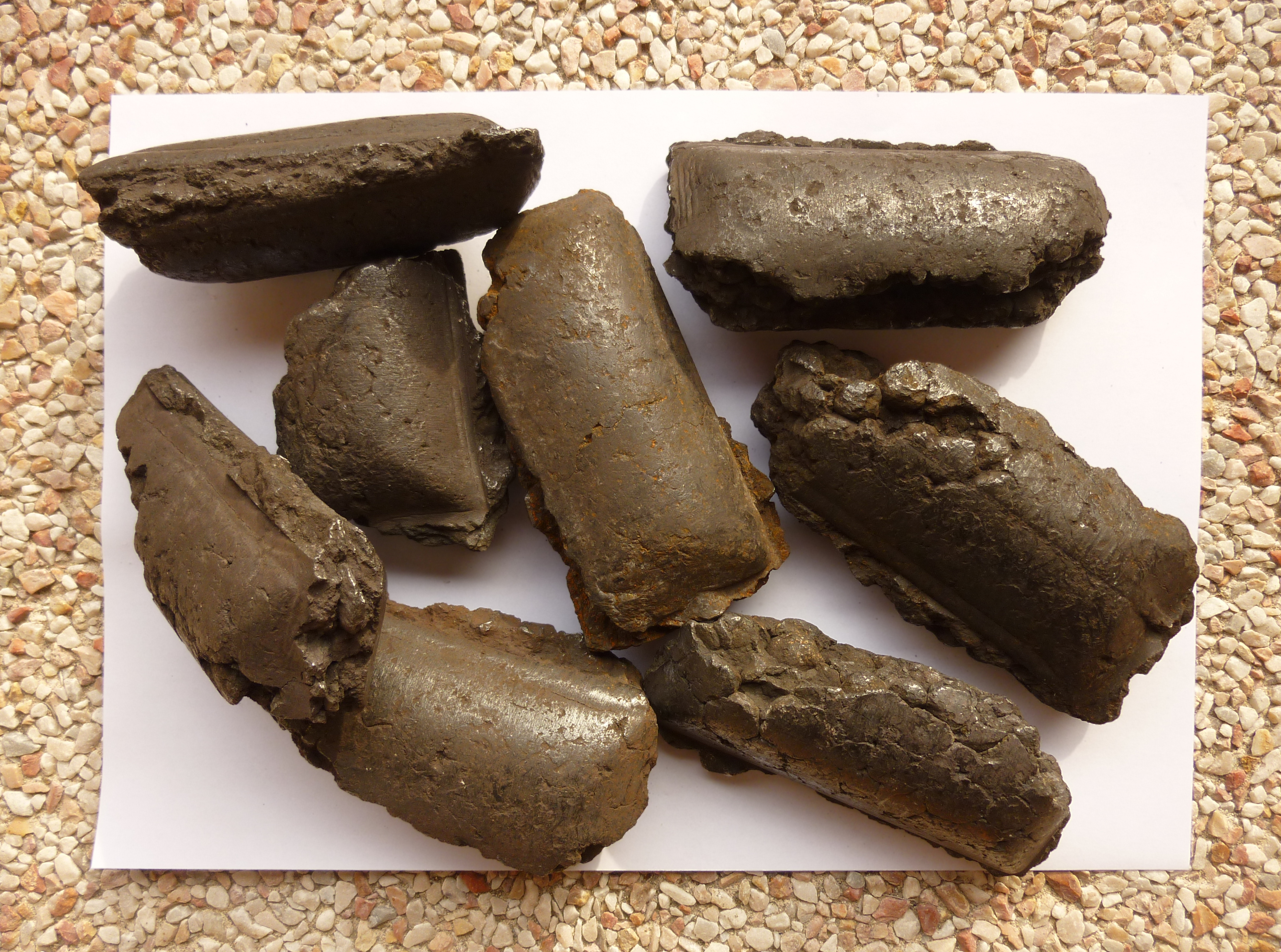
Hot-briquetted iron

Direct reduced iron (DRI), also called sponge iron, is produced from the direct reduction of iron ore (in the form of lumps, pellets, or fines) into iron by a reducing gas which contains carbon (produced from natural gas or coal) or hydrogen. When hydrogen is used as the reducing gas, no carbon dioxide is produced. Many ores are suitable for direct reduction.

Direct reduction refers to solid-state processes which reduce iron oxides to metallic iron at temperatures below the melting point of iron. Reduced iron derives its name from these processes, one example being heating iron ore in a furnace at a high temperature of 800 to 1,200 °C (1,470 to 2,190 °F) in the presence of syngas (a mixture of hydrogen and carbon monoxide) or pure hydrogen.

Production of direct-reduced iron and breakdown by process

== Process ==
Direct reduction processes can be divided roughly into two categories: gas-based and coal-based. In both cases, the objective of the process is to remove the oxygen contained in various forms of iron ore (sized ore, concentrates, pellets, mill scale, furnace dust, etc.) in order to convert the ore to metallic iron, without melting it (below 1,200 °C (2,190 °F)).

The direct reduction process is comparatively energy efficient. Steel made using DRI requires significantly less fuel, in that a traditional blast furnace is not needed. DRI is most commonly made into steel using electric arc furnaces to take advantage of the heat produced by the DRI product.

=== Benefits ===
Direct reduction processes were developed to overcome the difficulties of conventional blast furnaces. DRI plants need not be part of an integrated steel plant, as is characteristic of blast furnaces. The initial capital investment and operating costs of direct reduction plants are lower than integrated steel plants and are more suitable for developing countries where supplies of high-grade coking coal are limited, but where steel scrap is generally available for recycling. Many other countries use variants of the process.

Factors that help make DRI economical:

- Direct-reduced iron has about the same iron content as pig iron, typically 90–94% total iron (depending on the quality of the raw ore), so it is an excellent feedstock for the electric furnaces used by mini mills, allowing them to use lower grades of scrap for the rest of the charge or to produce higher grades of steel.
- Hot-briquetted iron (HBI) is a compacted form of DRI designed for ease of shipping, handling, and storage.
- Hot direct reduced iron (HDRI) is DRI that is transported hot, directly from the reduction furnace, into an electric arc furnace, thereby saving energy.
- The direct reduction process uses pelletized iron ore or natural "lump" ore. One exception is the fluidized-bed process, which requires sized iron ore particles.
- The direct reduction process can use natural gas contaminated with inert gases, avoiding the need to remove these gases for other use. However, any inert gas contamination of the reducing gas lowers the effect (quality) of that gas stream and the thermal efficiency of the process. The use of natural gas also produces greenhouse gases.
- Supplies of powdered ore and raw natural gas are both available in areas such as Northern Australia, avoiding transport costs for the gas. In most cases, the DRI plant is located near a natural gas source as it is more cost effective to ship the ore rather than the gas.
- To eliminate fossil fuel use in iron and steel making, renewable hydrogen gas can be used in place of syngas to produce DRI and eliminate production of greenhouse gases.

=== Complications ===
Direct reduced iron is susceptible to oxidation and rusting if left unprotected, and is normally processed further to steel. The bulk iron can also catch fire (it is pyrophoric). Unlike blast furnace pig iron, which is almost pure metal, scrap-based DRI contains some siliceous gangue, which needs to be removed in the steel-making process.

== History ==
Producing sponge iron and then working it was the earliest method used to obtain iron in the Middle East, Egypt, and Europe, where it remained in use until at least the 16th century.

Whilst bloomeries allowed for iron production at a lower furnace temperature (only about 1,100 °C or so), they produce iron at a much slower rate than a blast furnace.

== Chemistry ==
The following reactions successively convert hematite (from iron ore) into magnetite, magnetite into ferrous oxide, and ferrous oxide into iron by reduction with carbon monoxide or hydrogen.

$\ce{3 Fe2O3 + CO/H2 -> 2 Fe3O4 + CO2/H2O}$
$\ce{Fe3O4 + CO/H2 -> 3 FeO + CO2/H2O}$
$\ce{FeO + CO/H2 -> Fe + CO2/H2O}$

Carburizing produces cementite (Fe_{3}C):

$\ce{3 Fe + CH4 -> Fe3C + 2H2}$
$\ce{3 Fe + 2CO -> Fe3C + CO2}$
$\ce{3 Fe + CO +H2 -> Fe3C + H2O}$

== Production ==
India is the world's largest producer of direct-reduced iron.

== Uses ==
Sponge iron is not useful as-is and is typically processed to create wrought iron or steel. The sponge is removed from the furnace, called a bloomery, and repeatedly beaten with heavy hammers and folded over to remove the slag, oxidize any carbon or carbide, and weld the iron together. This treatment usually creates wrought iron with about three percent slag and a fraction of a percent of other impurities. Further treatment may add controlled amounts of carbon, allowing various kinds of heat treatment (e.g. "steeling").

Today, sponge iron is created by reducing iron ore without melting it. This makes for an energy-efficient feedstock for specialty steel manufacturers which used to rely upon scrap metal.

=== Food ===
Hydrogen-reduced iron is used as a source of food-grade iron powder, for food fortification and for oxygen scavenging. This elemental form is not absorbed as well as ferrous forms, but the oxygen-scavenging function keeps it attractive. Purity standards for this use were established in 1977.

== See also ==
- Krupp-Renn Process
- Blast furnace
- Pig iron
- Steel mill
- Direct reduction
