= Direct reduction (blast furnace) =

Fraction resulting from the direct reduction of iron oxides in a blast furnace

Direct reduction is the fraction of iron oxide reduction that occurs in a blast furnace due to the presence of coke carbon, while the remainder – indirect reduction – consists mainly of carbon monoxide from coke combustion.

It should also be noted that many non-ferrous oxides are reduced by this type of reaction in a blast furnace. This reaction is therefore essential to the operation of historical processes for the production of non-ferrous metals by non-steel blast furnaces (i.e. blast furnaces dedicated to the production of ferromanganese, ferrosilicon, etc., which have now disappeared).

Direct-reduction steelmaking processes that bring metal oxides into contact with carbon (typically those based on the use of hard coal or charcoal) also exploit this chemical reaction. In fact, at first glance, many of them seem to use only this reaction. Processes that historically competed with blast furnaces, such as the Catalan forge, have been assimilated into this reaction. But modern direct reduction processes are often based on the exclusive use of reducing gases: in this case, their name takes on the exact opposite meaning to that of the chemical reaction.

== Definition ==
For blast furnaces, direct reduction corresponds to the reduction of oxides by the carbon in the coke. However, in practice, direct reduction only plays a significant role in the final stage of iron reduction in a blast furnace, by helping to reduce wustite (FeO) to iron. In this case, the chemical reaction can be trivially described as follows:

FeO + C → Fe + CO, consuming 155.15 kJ/mol

However, "in the solid state, there is virtually no reaction in the absence of gases, even between finely ground iron ore and coal powders. In other words, it seems certain that the reaction takes place via gases". This means that direct reduction most probably corresponds to the following chain of reactions:

FeO + CO → Fe + CO_{2}, producing 17.45 kJ/mol (reduction by CO)

CO_{2} + C ⇌ 2 CO, consuming 172.45 kJ/mol (Boudouard reaction)

== Roles ==
This reaction accounts for around half of the transformation of wustite, FeO, into iron, (Note: This proportion leads some authors to break down the reduction of wustite (which is a non-stoichiometric compound with a variable oxidation rate) into two successive stages: 2FeO + CO → 2FeO_{0.5} + CO_{2} and 2FeO_{0.5} + C → 2Fe + CO) and removes 30% of the total oxygen supplied, mainly in the form of iron(III) oxide, Fe_{2}O_{3}. This mode of wustite reduction is highly endothermic, whereas the reduction of iron oxides by CO is slightly exothermic (+155.15 kJ/mol vs. –17.45 kJ/mol), so it is essential to keep it to a minimum.

This reaction concerns all the iron oxides present in a blast furnace, but also manganese(II) oxides (Mno), silica (SiO_{2}), chromium, vanadium, and titanium, which are partially reduced in blast furnaces. These chemical reactions are described below:

MnO + C → Mn + CO, consuming 282.4 kJ/mol at 1400 °C (begins above 1000 °C and involves half the manganese present in the charge)

SiO_{2} + 2C → Si + 2CO, consuming 655.5 kJ/mol (begins above 1500 °C)

Chromium and vanadium behave like manganese, and titanium like silicon. As for the other iron oxides, their direct reduction is of negligible importance. This can be written as:

3Fe_{2}O_{3} + C → 2Fe_{3}O_{4} + CO, consuming 118.821 kJ/mol

Fe_{3}O_{4} + C → 3FeO + CO, consuming 209.256 kJ/mol

In non-steel blast furnaces, dedicated to the production of ferroalloys, direct reduction is fundamental. For example, for ferronickel production, both direct reduction reactions are used:

NiO + C → Ni + CO, above 445 °C

FeO + C → Fe + CO, above 800 °C

So, although nickel reduces slightly more easily than iron, it cannot be reduced and cast independently of iron.
