= LARCO =

Greek ferro-nickel production

Larco
- Type: State-owned company
- Industry: Metals, Smelting, Mining
- Founded: 1963
- Defunct: 25 July 2022
- Headquarters: Larymna, Greece
- Products: Nickel, Technology and R&D
- Website: www.larco.gr/index.php

The General Mining and Metallurgical Company SA (Greek: Γενική Μεταλλευτική και Μεταλλουργική Α.Ε.), better known as LARCO (ΛΑΡΚΟ), was a ferro-nickel production company in Greece. It had mines in the regions of Euboea, Neo Kokkino, Kastoria and Servia. The company also had a metallurgical plant in Larymna, which employed the majority of the company's employees.

The ore exploited by the company was the nickel-rich limonite. The deposits exploited by the company underwent open pit mining, although 2% were mined underground. The final result was a granular, high purity, low-carbon ferric, which is used exclusively in the production of stainless steel and was transported from the port of Larymna.

On July 25, 2022 the company went defunct.

== History ==
LARCO was founded in 1963 by Prodromos Bodosakis-Athanasiadis, with headquarters in Marousi in Athens. In 1966, the construction of the factory in Larymna was completed and in 1968 the construction of a settlement for the workers and their families was completed.

The mines of Euboea were fully exploited in 1969 and in 1972 two new electric furnaces were added to Larymna.

In 1977, Europe's first long-distance conveyor belt, with a length of 7.5 km, was installed to reduce the cost of transporting the ore by truck.

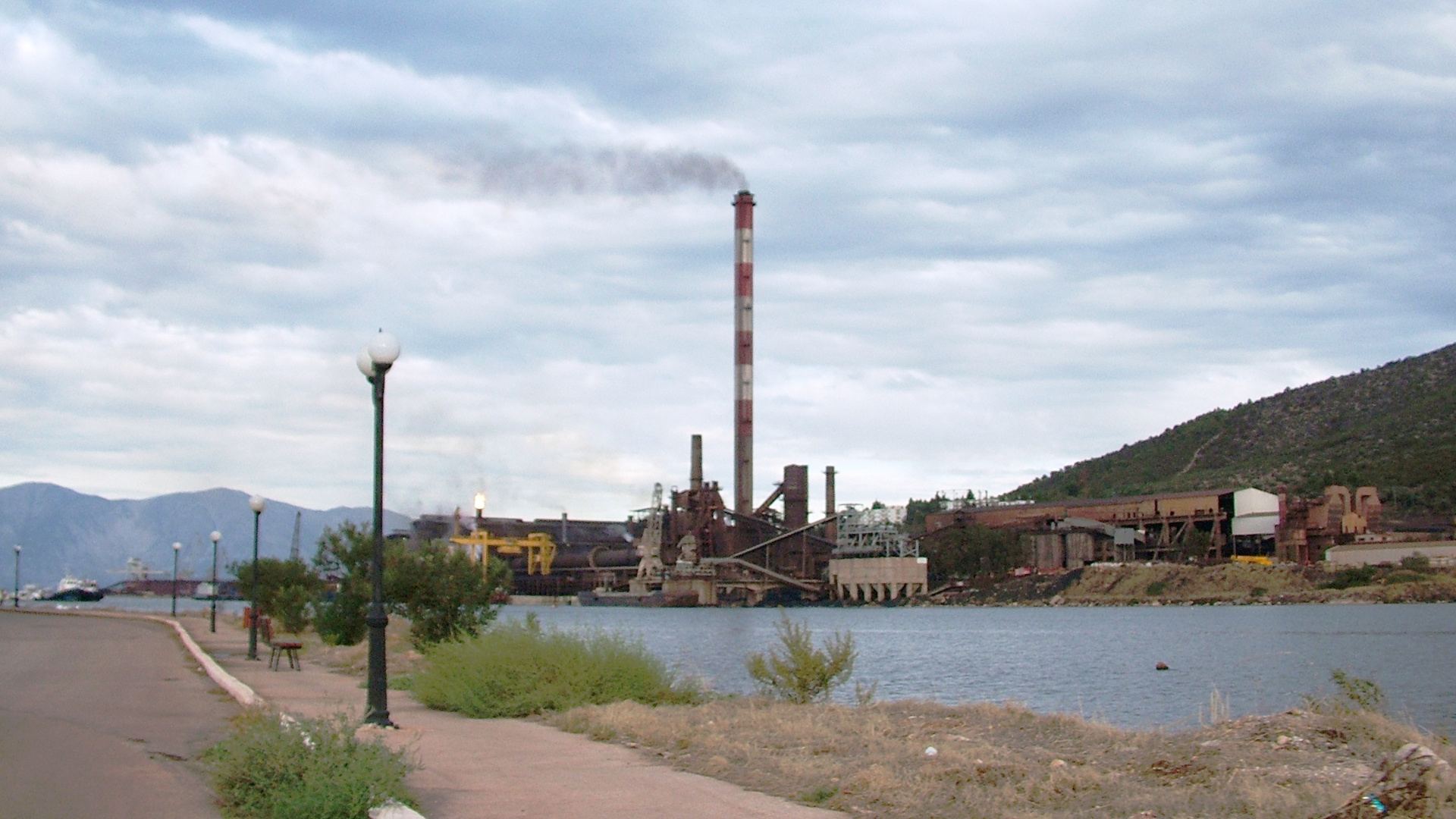
Nickel smelting factory in Larymna.
