= Athabascaite =

Selenide mineral

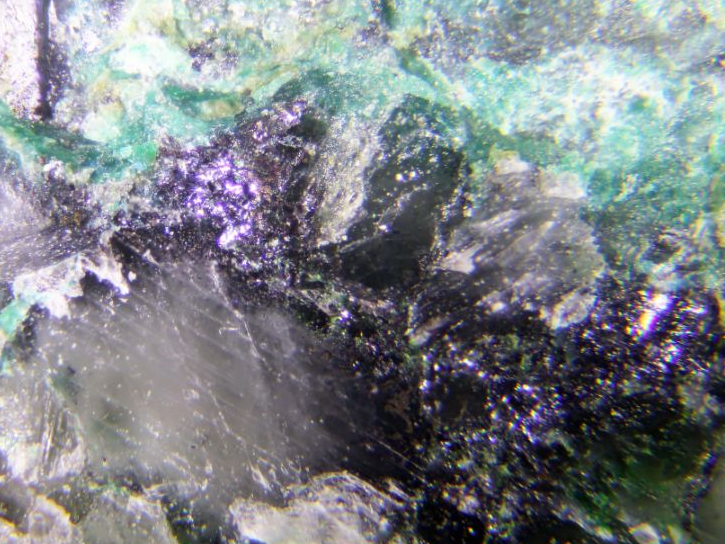

General
- Category: Selenide mineral
- Formula: Cu_{5}Se_{4}
- IMA symbol: Atb
- Strunz classification: 2.BA.15d
- Crystal system: Orthorhombic; Unknown space group
- Unit cell: a = 8.227 Å, b = 11.982 Å c = 6.441 Å; Z = 4

Identification
- Color: Light grey, bluish-gray to white
- Crystal habit: As anhedral inclusions and lath shaped crystals, also massive
- Mohs scale hardness: 2.5
- Luster: Metallic
- Diaphaneity: Opaque
- Specific gravity: 6.59 (calculated)
- Optical properties: Anisotropism strong, creamy white to dark blue
- Pleochroism: Distinct, pale gray to blue-gray

Athabascaite is a member of the copper selenide minerals, and forms with other copper selenides. It was first discovered by S. Kaiman in 1949 while he was researching radioactive materials around Lake Athabasca. Kaiman was conducting research near Uranium City, Saskatchewan where mass amounts of uranium mines were present.

== History ==
Kaiman sent his specimens for testing to J. W. Earley, then a graduate student. With the invention of the microprobe analyzer, D.C. Harris decided to delve further into the virtually unknown mineral with little success.

== Structure ==
Because of unavailability of sufficiently large single crystals, little is known about the atomic structure of athabascaite. Copper (Cu^{+}) serves as the cations, selenium (Se^{2−}) serves as the anions, and the two are joined by ionic bonds. The crystal symmetry appears orthorhombic with the lattice parameters a = 8.227 ± 0.01, b = 11.982 ± 0.02, and c = 6.441 ± 0.01 Å. It has a calculated density of 6.59 g/cm^{3}; this density is identical to that of umangite, and therefore the two are thought to have similar structure.

== Physical properties ==
Athabascaite often contains umangite as inclusions and stained carbonate vein material as stringers and veinlets. When coupled with umangite, the mineral forms lath-shaped slender and elongated grains averaging 20 by 50 micrometers. Athabascaite originally appeared as finer grained than the surrounding material, possessing a core of umangite. Because of the presence of umangite within the core, it is thought that the umangite may recrystallize during the construction of athabascaite. Within the hematite, stained carbonate veins contain massive areas up to 300 micrometers in diameter. The veinlets are composed of a collection of arbitrarily organized crystals which rarely surpass 2 micrometres. These crystallites contain pure athabascaite phase.

The color of athabascaite is typically light gray, but can also be white, white-gray, and blue-gray. It has a hardness of approximately 2.50 on the Mohs scale. When exposed to polarized light, it displays a range of colors varying from creamy white to dark blue. The display of these distinct colors, along with its reflectivity, allows athabascaite to be easily distinguished from other copper selenide minerals. It displays strong anisotropy and distinct birefringence.

== Geologic occurrence ==
After being discovered in Canada, a few other samples have been found in Petrovice, Vysočina Region, Predborice, and Koksin Hill, Czech Republic; Puy-de-Dôme, France; Kalmar, Sweden; La Rioja Province, Argentina; and most recently the Democratic Republic of Congo; all of which were found in or near uranium mines. In Canada, athabascaite is commonly associated with umangite, clausthalite, eucairite, berzelianite, sulfatian berzelianite, klockmannite, eskebornite, tyrrellite, native copper, native silver, uraninite, hematite, pyrite, calcite, barite, quartz and feldspar. In Argentina and Sweden, it is associated with umangite and berzelianite. In the Czech Republic, it occurs with berzelianite, eucairite, crookesite, tyrrellite, ferroselite, bukovite, krutaite, calcite and dolomite. In the Congo, it is associated with digenite, berzelianite, yarrowite, spionkopite, trogtalite, native copper and native gold.
