= Kruťaite =

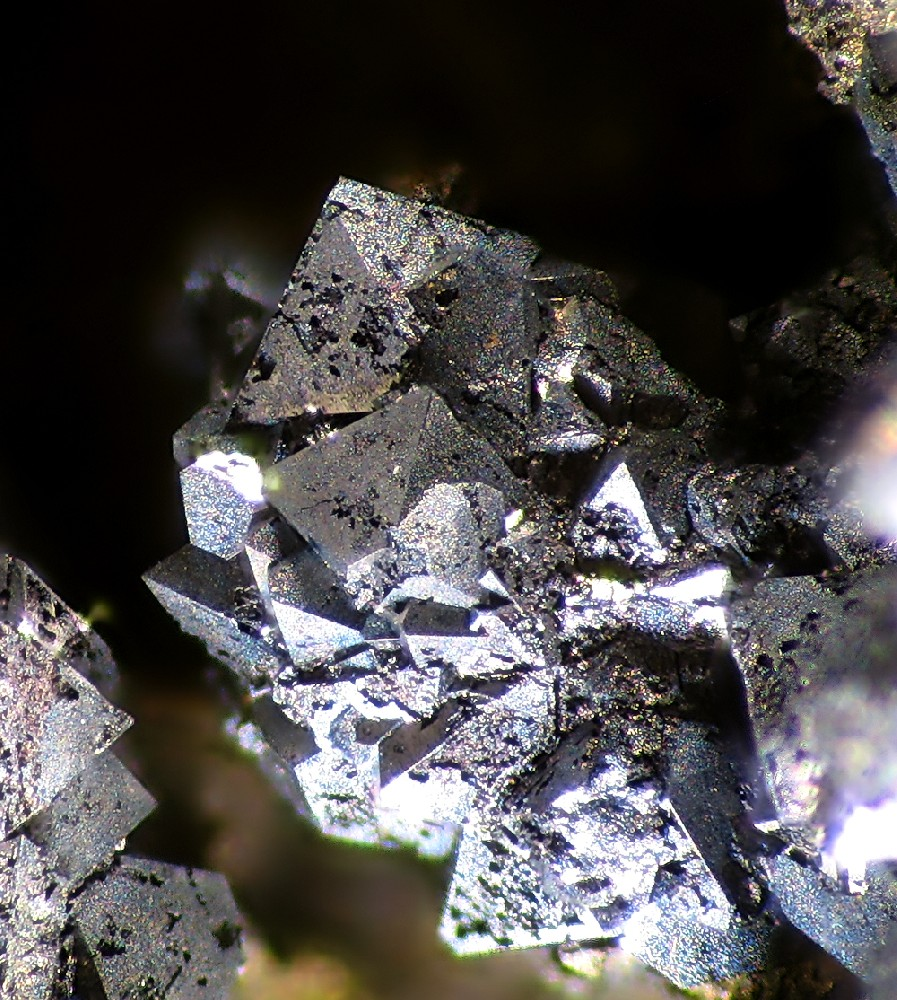
- Kruťaite from El Dragón mine, Antonio Quijarro Province, Potosí Department, Bolivia (picture width 2.5 mm).

General
- Category: Selenide minerals
- Formula: CuSe_{2}
- IMA symbol: Krt
- Strunz classification: 2.EB.05a
- Dana classification: 2.12.1.8
- Crystal system: Cubic
- Crystal class: Diploidal (m3̅); H-M symbol: (2/m 3̅)
- Space group: Isometric; Space group: Pa3̅
- Unit cell: a = 6.056 Å, Z = 4

Identification
- Color: Grey
- Crystal habit: Often found as inclusions or octahedral crystals.
- Cleavage: Good
- Mohs scale hardness: 4
- Luster: Metallic
- Streak: Dark grey
- Diaphaneity: Opaque
- Specific gravity: 6.53 (calculated)
- Ultraviolet fluorescence: None
- Solubility: Insoluble
- Common impurities: Co, Ni, Fe, Hg

Kruťaite, simplified Krut'aite or krutaite, is a rare mineral with the formula CuSe_{2}. It crystallises in the cubic crystal system. It is part of the pyrite group, being composed of Cu^{2+} ions and Se_{2}^{2−} ions. The mineral is most often found as a dark grey aggregate consisting of tiny crystals no more than a millimeter in size. The crystals are opaque in any size.

== Etymology ==
Kruťaite was first discovered in Petrovice in Okres Žďár nad Sázavou, Czech Republic and described in 1972 by Zdenek Johan, Paul Picot, Roland Pierrot and Milan Kvaček. It was named after Tomáš Kruťa (1906–1998), a Czech mineralogist and director of the mineralogical laboratory of the Moravian museum.

The International Mineralogical Association's rules on naming newly recognized minerals specify that a mineral name derived from a person's name should be capitalized and preserve any diacritics from the person's home language (or its romanization). Thus, the older spellings krutaite and Krutaite are deprecated in favour of Kruťaite. In Czech orthography, when a háček (◌̌) modifies a lowercase t, it has a reduced klička form (as ť) which looks like an apostrophe.

== Occurrence ==
Kruťaite forms through hydrothermal processes and is often associated with clausthalite, eskebornite, berzelianite, uraninite, hematite, ferroselite, bukovite, umangite, chalcopyrite and goethite. It forms a solid solution series with trogtalite.

It was first identified in Petrovice, Okres Žďár nad Sázavou, Czech Republic, which is the only known locality in the Czech republic for the mineral, but it has since been identified in other places in the world.

Notable is the El Dragón Mine, Antonio Quijarro Province, Bolivia, where crystals up to a millimeter in size have been found. Other localities include:

Weintraube Mine, Lerbach, Rosenhof veins, Clausthal-Zellerfeld, Harz, Lower Saxony, Germany.

Tumiñico Mine, Sierra de Cacho, Villa Castelli, General La Madrid department, La Rioja, Argentina.

Yutangba Selenium deposit, Enshi Co., Enshi Tujia and Miao Autonomous Prefecture (E'xi Autonomous Prefecture), Hubei Province, China.

== See also ==
- List of minerals
- List of minerals named after people
