= Stilleite =

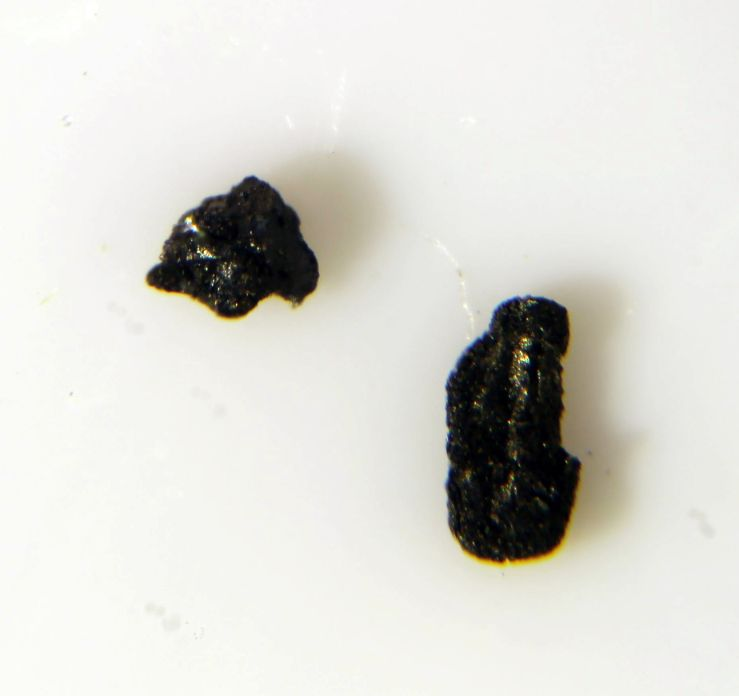
- Single crystal aggregates of stilleite from the Shinkolobwe deposit

General
- Category: Selenide mineral
- Formula: ZnSe
- IMA symbol: Sll
- Strunz classification: 2.CB.05a
- Crystal system: Cubic
- Crystal class: Hextetrahedral (4̅3m); H-M symbol: (4̅ 3m)
- Space group: F4̅3m
- Unit cell: a = 5.667 Å; Z = 4

Structure
- Jmol (3D): Interactive image

Identification
- Color: Gray
- Mohs scale hardness: 5
- Luster: Metallic
- Diaphaneity: Opaque to translucent
- Specific gravity: 5.42
- Optical properties: Isotropic
- Refractive index: About 2.5

Stilleite is a selenide mineral, zinc selenide, with the formula ZnSe. It has been found only as microscopic gray crystals occurring as inclusions in linnaeite associated with other selenide and sulfides. It was originally discovered in Katanga Province, Zaire in 1956 and is named for the German geologist, Hans Stille (1876–1966).

It has been reported from the Santa Brigida mine, La Rioja Province, Argentina and from Tilkerode (Abberode) in the Harz Mountains, Germany. Associated minerals include pyrite, linnaeite, clausthalite, selenian vaesite, molybdenite and dolomite in the Shinkolobwe region of the Congo); and with tiemannite, clausthalite, eucairite, umangite, klockmannite in the Santa Brigida mine, Argentina.

== See also ==
- List of minerals
- List of minerals named after people
