= Chrisstanleyite =

General
- Category: Selenide minerals
- Formula: Ag_{2}Pd_{3}Se_{4}
- IMA symbol: Csl
- Strunz classification: 2.BC.15
- Crystal system: Monoclinic
- Crystal class: Prismatic (2/m) (same H-M symbol)
- Space group: P2_{1}/c

Identification
- Formula mass: 833.49 g/mol
- Color: Grey, silvery grey
- Crystal habit: aggregates and microscopic crystals
- Twinning: Fine polysynthetic and parquetlike
- Cleavage: no prominent cleavage
- Fracture: slight fracture
- Tenacity: brittle
- Mohs scale hardness: 5
- Luster: metallic
- Streak: black
- Diaphaneity: opaque
- Specific gravity: 3.6
- Density: 8.31
- Pleochroism: very light to green-grey buff

Chrisstanleyite, Ag_{2}Pd_{3}Se_{4}, is a selenide mineral that crystallizes in high saline, acidic hydrothermal solution at low temperatures as part of selenide vein inclusions in and alongside calcite veins. It tends to be found in assemblages of other selenides: jagueite, naumannite, fischesserite, oosterboschite, and tiemannite, and it is a solid solution mineral with jagueite Cu_{2}Pd_{3}Se_{4} in which it shares a unique crystal structure that has not been identified elsewhere (Paar et al. 1998; Nickel 2002; Paar et al. 2004). Chrisstanleyite and jagueite are unlike the other minerals of the selenide family as they do not have a sulfide analogue (Topa et al. 2006). First discovered by Werner Paar from a sample received from Hope's Nose, Torquay, Devon, England, chrisstanleyite has since been discovered in the Pilbara region of Western Australia and in El Chire, La Rioja, Argentina. Chrisstanleyite was named after the Deputy Head and Associate Keeper at the Department of Mineralogy at The Natural History Museum in London.

== Composition ==
The chemical formula of chrisstanleyite is Ag_{2}Pd_{3}Se_{4} and contains trace amounts of Cu (Paar et al. 1998). Based on the sample received from Hope's Nose, England, Paar (1998) was able to utilize 7 grains in two polished sections to run 26 electron-microprobe analyses. The results of the analysis allowed Paar et al. (1998) to derive the average composition as (Ag_{2.01}Cu_{0.02})_{Σ2.03}Pd_{3.02}Se_{3.95}, or the ideal formula of Ag_{2}Pd_{3}Se_{4}. The weight percent per element to create the ideal formula is Pd 37.52, Ag 25.36, Se 37.12, totaling 100% (Paar et al. 1998).

The presence of Cu in the sample proved important as the discovery of chrisstanleyite in the Pilbara Region of Western Australia found intergrown with an unnamed Cu-dominant equivalent (Nickel 2002). In 2004, this unknown mineral was officially named jagueite, Cu_{2}Pd_{3}Se_{4}, after being found in El Chire, Argentina (Paar et al. 2004) and has been identified to form a solid-solution with chrisstanleyite (Paar et al. 1998; Nickel 2002; Paar et al. 2004).

== Geologic occurrence ==
Chrisstanleyite occurs in selenide inclusions in and along calcite veins that cut through limestone (Paar et al. 2004). A selenide vein 10 cm below a calcite vein in Hope's Nose, where chrisstanleyite was initially identified, reflected a well-defined zoned sequence of minerals. The top of the sequence included native gold with small amounts of silver, while the middle layer consisted of palladian gold. The bottom layer consisted of selenide mineralization, primarily made of fischesserite (Paar et al. 1998).

Chrisstanleyite was identified in a second deposit, a dolomite-rich assemblage in the Pilbara region of Western Australia. Within the assemblage included a homogeneous fine-grained layer of malachite, quartz, and goethite along with heterogeneous grouping of dark nodules and masses in a malachite-quartz matrix. A group of selenides were found in these masses and include berzelianite Cu_{2}Se, umangite Cu_{3}S_{2}, naumannite Ag_{2}Se, oosterboschite (Pd, Cu)_{7}Se_{5}, luberoite Pt_{5}Se_{4}, chrisstanleyite, and, at the time, the unknown jagueite (Nickel 2002; Paar et al. 2004). Native silver, gold, unidentified palladium and platinum oxides, and several other minerals were identified as well. A similar ore deposit was found in Northern Australia and had had microthermometry and low-temperature laser Raman spectroscopy utilized in this assemblage. The results showed the minerals came from an acidic, high saline hydrothermal solution at temperatures of 140 °C. The interaction of hydrothermal fluids with feldspathic rocks precipitated the ore minerals (Nickel 2002).

A third deposit of chrisstanleyite was found in El Chire, La Rioja, Argentina in a cutting calcite vein containing only one selenide-bearing vein through a hematite-rich sandstone and arkose host rocks. These rocks, similar to those from the Pilbara Region in Australia, were hydrothermally altered. The selenide vein included similar minerals tiemannite HgSe, naumannite, clausthalite, umangite, klockmannite, chrisstanleyite, and jagueite. It was identified that the grains of chrisstanleyite were surrounded by a rim of unnamed platinum-group metals, which were too thin to extract for identification, though it is associated with a silvery-mercury alloy. This allowed determination of crystallization for the selenide assemblage: chrisstanleyite and jagueite → (clausthalite) → naumannite and tiemannite → umangite and klockmannite → Pd-free native gold (Paar et al. 2004).

== Structure ==
The crystal structure for chrisstanleyite has two different polyhedra structures that intersect and support each other, which is the same as jagueite. An AgSe_{4} (or CuSe_{4}) tetrahedral creates a grooved (100) layer that are grouped in dimers of Ag_{2}Se_{6}, which share four vertices with adjacent dimers. Oriented alternatively above and below the layer are the two remaining vertices for each tetrahedron, resulting in the corrugation of the silver-based layer as well the sharing of Se atoms with Pd polyhedra (Topa et al. 2006).

The second framework consists of single coordination squares of Pd1 and paired Pd2 polyhedra, which create a zig-zag composition. These Pd2 polyhedra are layered at an angle (010) and interconnected by the Pd1 squares. This then creates the c glide planes that cause the zig-zag pattern (Topa et al. 2006).

Stability in the two frameworks is created by the metal-metal bonds in the direction of [210]. These interconnect the metal atoms of one [010] layer of the zig-zag structure, as well as taking the Pd2 arrangement of both adjacent layers. The linear arrangement of these three layers creates stability for the creased angles of the Pd2 zig-zag pattern (Topa et al. 2006).

The structures found in chrisstanleyite and jagueite appear to be different from that of any other mineral. Comparing these with other Pd and Pt sulfides and selenides, no relations have been found. The closest structure found was with KCuPdSe_{5}, which also forms corrugated layers, but the diagonally stacked squares are only one polyhedron deep. Additionally, the distances of Pd-Cu structures are not that of metal-metal bonds. Topa et al. (2006) concluded that chrisstanleyite and jagueite are a new structure type lacking a sulfide counterpart.

== Special characteristics ==
A prominent feature chrisstanleyite has and shares with oosterboschite is that it has fine polysynthetic and parquet-like twinning. The difference between the two is that chrisstanleyite anisotropic rotation tints is much more colorful (Paar et al. 1998). Chrisstanleyite, also, forms a limited solid-solution with jagueite (Nickel 2002; Paar et al. 2004). Based on samples found in the Pilbara Region, the two minerals were both yellow and indistinguishable in reflected light and had weak bireflectance and moderate anisotropy (Nickel 2002).

== See also ==
- List of minerals
- List of minerals named after people
