= Eskebornite =

General
- Category: Selenide minerals
- Formula: CuFeSe_{2}
- IMA symbol: Ebn
- Strunz classification: 2.CB.10a
- Dana classification: 2.9.1.2
- Crystal class: Tetragonal

Identification
- Color: Brassy yellow
- Crystal habit: Thick tabular crystals, massive
- Cleavage: {001} perfect
- Mohs scale hardness: 3–3.5
- Luster: Metallic
- Streak: Black
- Diaphaneity: Opaque
- Density: 5.35 (measured) 5.44 (calculated)
- Pleochroism: Creamy yellow to yellowish brown
- Ultraviolet fluorescence: None
- Solubility: Insoluble
- Common impurities: Ag, S
- Other characteristics: Distinctly magnetic

Eskebornite is a selenide mineral with the formula CuFeSe_{2}. It crystallizes in the tetragonal system and it has a brassy colour. Eskebornite is sometimes found as thick tabular crystals, but is more often found intergrown with other selenides. It is part of the chalcopyrite group and forms a series with chalcopyrite.

== Occurrence ==
Eskebornite was first identified in 1949 by Paul Ramdohr in the Eskaborn Adit, Tilkerode (Abberode), Harz, Saxony-Anhalt, Germany, which it was also named after. It is often found with other selenides, including clausthalite, tiemannite, berzelianite, naumannite, umangite, geffroyite, and chaméanite, but also with other minerals like chalcopyrite, uraninite, ankerite, and dolomite.

== See also ==
- List of minerals
