= Pyrite group =

Group of cubic crystal system minerals

The pyrite group of minerals is a set of cubic crystal system minerals with diploidal structure. Each metallic element is bonded to six "dumbbell" pairs of non-metallic elements and each "dumbbell" pair is bonded to six metal atoms.

The group is named for its most common member, pyrite (fool's gold), which is sometimes explicitly distinguished from the group's other members as iron pyrite.

Pyrrhotite (magnetic pyrite) is magnetic, and is composed of iron and sulfur, but it has a different structure and is not in the pyrite group.

== Pyrite group minerals ==
Pyrite-group minerals include:

- Aurostibite AuSb_{2}
- Cattierite CoS_{2}
- Dzharkenite FeSe_{2}
- Erlichmanite OsS_{2}
- Fukuchilite Cu_{3}FeS_{8}
- Gaotaiite Ir_{3}Te_{8}
- Geversite PtSb_{2}
- Hauerite MnS_{2}
- Insizwaite PtBi_{2}
- Kruťaite CuSe_{2}
- Krutovite NiAs_{2}
- Laurite RuS_{2}
- Penroseite (Ni,Co,Cu)Se_{2}
- Pyrite Fe[S_{2}]
- Sperrylite PtAs_{2}
- Trogtalite CoSe_{2}
- Vaesite NiS_{2}
- Villamanínite CuS_{2}
