= Paul F. Kerr =

Professor of mineralogy, Columbia University, New York NY

Paul Francis Kerr
- Born: 12 February 1897; Hemet, California
- Died: 27 February 1981 (aged 84)
- Education: Stanford University
- Occupation: Professor of Mineralogy

Dr. Paul F. Kerr (12 February 1897 – 27 February 1981) was a Professor of Mineralogy at Columbia University. During the second World War, he was tasked with locating and procuring supplies of uranium for the Manhattan Project. Kerr had an academic interest in the geology of tungsten, uranium and clay minerals. He pioneered the use of X-rays in the process of mineral identification and is considered to be one of the fathers of applied mineralogy. At Columbia University he was instrumental in the founding of the Lamont–Doherty Earth Observatory.

== Academic career ==
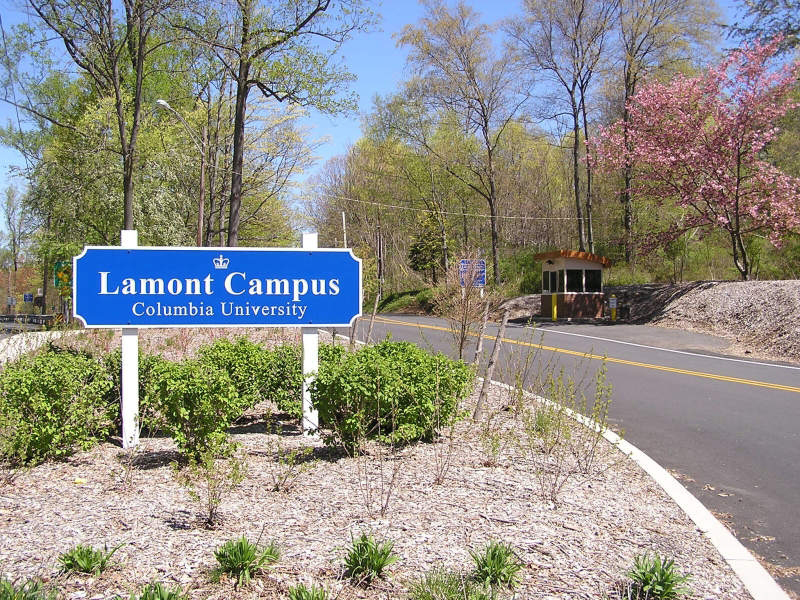
Columbia University, Lamont Campus in Palisades, New York

Paul Francis Kerr graduated from Occidental College and obtained his doctorate in geology from Stanford University in 1923. His dissertation was entitled "The determination of opaque ore minerals by X-ray diffraction patterns". Kerr became a lecturer at Columbia University in 1924 and was appointed Instructor in 1925, Assistant Professor in 1926, Associate Professor in 1932, and full Professor in 1940. From 1959 he held the title of Newberry Professor of Mineralogy. Paul F. Kerr also served as Secretary of the Mineralogical Society of America from 1934 to 1944 and was its President in 1946.

== Manhattan Project ==
On October 9, 1941, shortly before the United States entered World War II, President Franklin D. Roosevelt approved a crash program to develop the atomic bomb. The key raw material for the project was uranium, which was used as fuel for the reactors, as feed that was transformed into plutonium, and, in its enriched form, in the atomic bomb itself. There were four known major deposits of uranium in 1940: in Colorado, in northern Canada, in Joachimsthal in Czechoslovakia, and in the Belgian Congo. A professor at Columbia University, Kerr was seconded to work on the Manhattan Project, tasked with locating and procuring supplies of uranium. As part of this assignment, he traveled to Katanga Province in the Belgian Congo, he also visited and assessed the Canadian Eldorado deposit on Great Bear Lake, and the vanadium mines of the Colorado Plateau. Kerr's association with the Manhattan Project and later with the Atomic Energy Commission continued until late in the Cold War.

== International Atomic Energy Agency ==
Immediately after the second world war, Kerr was asked by the Carnegie Endowment for International Peace to chair a commission to investigate problems with the international inspection of atomic materials. He was appointed by the United Nations in 1955 to prepare study materials for the First International Congress on the Peaceful Uses of Atomic Energy in Geneva.

== Mineral nomenclature ==
In 1949, Kerr and Johannes F. Vaes were the first to describe Sengierite, a radioactive mineral discovered at the Luiswishi Mine about 20 km north of Lubumbashi in Katanga Province. Kerr also had a part in the naming of at least 7 other minerals-Alleghanyite, Cattierite, Dickite, Hydrotungstite, Tungomelane, Umohoite, and Vaesite.

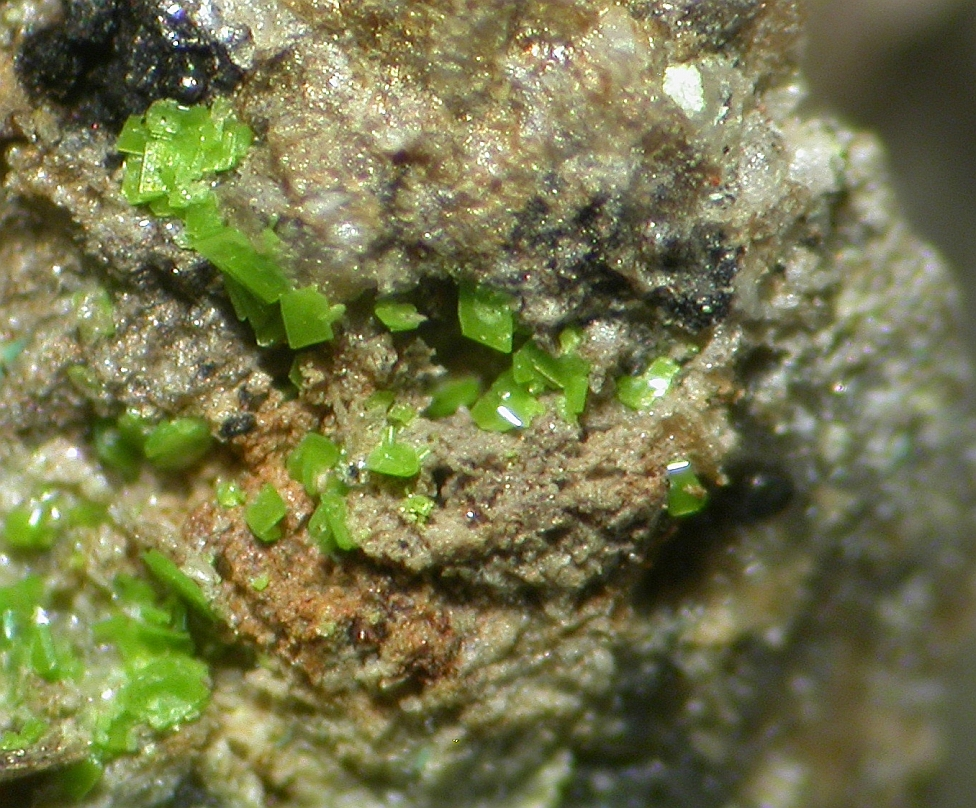
Sengierite

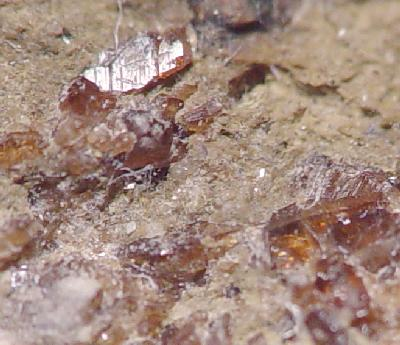
Alleghanyite

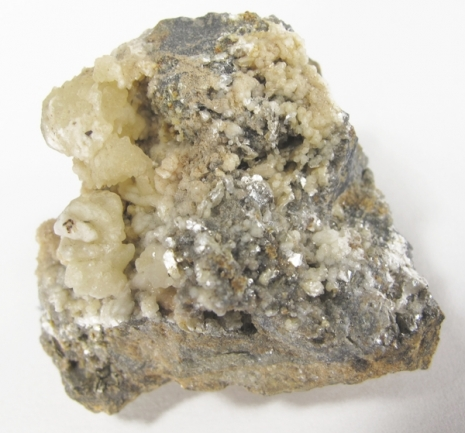
Dickite

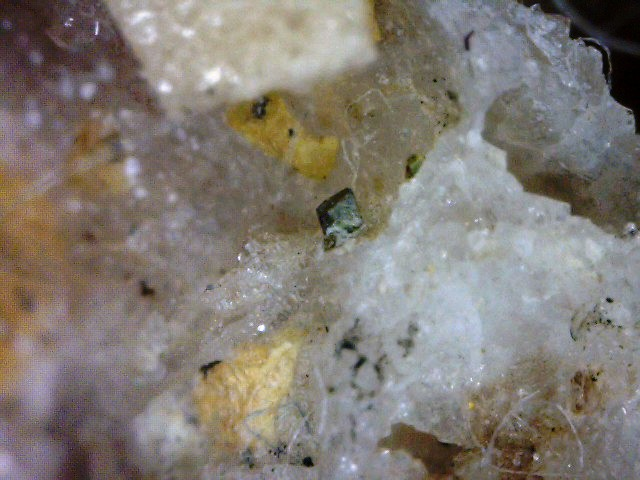
Vaesite

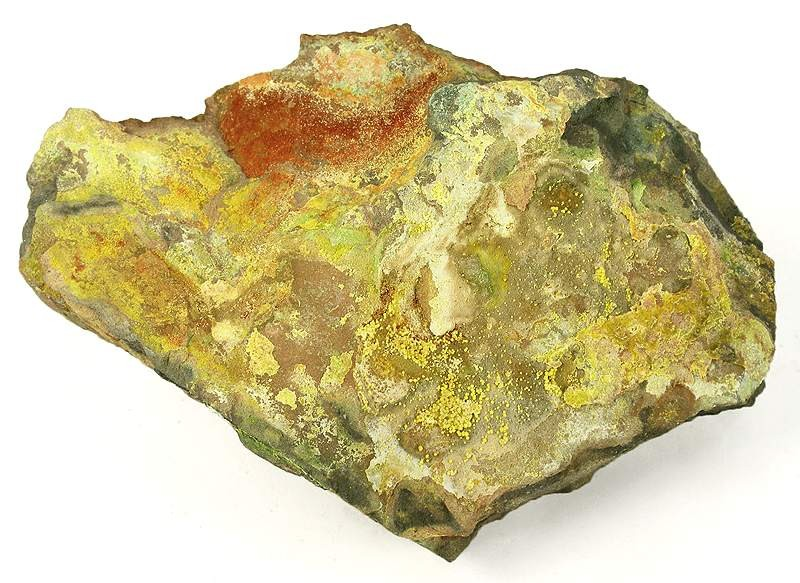
Umohoite
