= Penroseite =

Rare selenide mineral

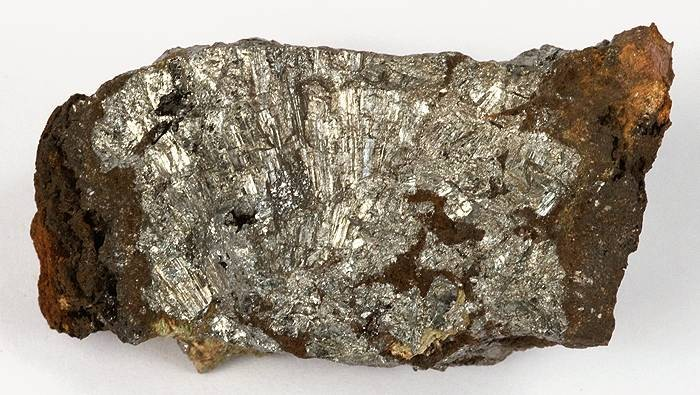
- Penroseite from Pakajake Canyon, Chayanta Province, Potosí Department, Bolivia

General
- Category: Selenide minerals, pyrite group
- Formula: (Ni,Co,Cu)Se_{2}
- IMA symbol: Pen
- Strunz classification: 2.EB.05a
- Dana classification: 02.12.01.04
- Crystal system: isometric
- Crystal class: Diploidal (m3̅); H-M symbol: (2/m 3̅)
- Space group: Pa3̅

Identification
- Color: Steel gray
- Crystal habit: Radial, columnar, reniform
- Cleavage: {001} Perfect, {011} Distinct
- Fracture: Subconchoidal
- Tenacity: Brittle
- Mohs scale hardness: 2.5 - 3
- Luster: Metallic
- Streak: Black
- Diaphaneity: Opaque
- Specific gravity: 6.58-6.74

Penroseite is a rare selenide mineral with formula (Ni,Co,Cu)Se_{2}. It has a gray-steel color and black streak with a hardness of 3. It is an isometric mineral, 2/m3̅. Penroseite was first discovered in 1925 in a Bolivian rhyolite. It was named for Richard Penrose (1863–1931), an economic geologist.

Penroseite is a rare mineral found in the Pacajake mine in Bolivia. It was discovered in 1925. It used to be found in fissure veins in the extrusive igneous rhyolite rock. It is considered as a member of the pyrite group from the perspective of its structure, with a cubic space group (Bayliss, 1989).

Penroseite makes extensive solid solutions with other minerals. For example, penroseite can be a result of alteration process of many selenides, such as olsacherite Pb_{2}(SO_{4})(SeO_{4}). Olsacherite forms very sparingly in well formed crystal covering the walls of the external side of the small cracks (Hurlbut, 1969). Another mineral related to penroseite is piretite. It occurs as an alteration product of uraninite and primary selenium-bearing sulfides, such as penroseite. Piretite forms as crusts in association with an orange masuyite-like U-Pb oxide on the surface of uraninite samples (Vochten, 1996).

== Composition ==
Its composition have mixture of elements, some of them are primary elements such as nickel (Ni), copper (Cu), cobalt (Co), and selenium (Se) that make with each other a substitution in different amounts. The secondary elements, that might be found in penroseite due to the occurrence process or the environment in which the mineral was deposited, are silver (Ag), mercury (Hg), and lead (Pb)(Gordon, 1926). Lead, that was considered as a part of the composition when it was discovered, found to be in the composition due to the intergrowth of clausthalite PbSe and is not a primary element(Earley, 1950). Penroseite has a high content of selenium like no other mineral, and as a result it was reported as the first nickel selenide mineral discovered (Gordon, 1926).

== Physical properties ==
Penroseite is a massive mineral. It can have radiating, columnar, or granular structure (Gordon, 1926). It shows a dull lead-gray to steel-gray color with a black streak. It has a metallic luster and thought to have a weak chemical bonding and that what makes it with a low hardness around 3 (Earley, 1950). When it reacts with HNO_{3} or KCN, a fumes tarnish to brown are resulted. But if it reacts with HCl, FeCl_{3}, or HgCl_{2}, it does not show any activity (Gordon, 1926).

== Geologic occurrence ==
The mineral is found in the Pacajake mine in Colquechaca, 150 km (93 mi) southeast of Oruro Department, Bolivia. Penroseite comes from the vicinity, and forms in fissure veins in rhyolite. It is not found in-situ, rather only in float (loose rocks) from undiscovered veins which have either been eroded away or remain hidden in the mountain above (Gordon, 1926).

== Structure ==
Penroseite has a cubic space group Pa3 (Bayliss, 1989). It was found that it behaves like isotropic crystals in which light passes through all directions with the same speed, which is strong enough to conclude that it is isometric (Bannister, 1937). Since it is isometric, all axes equal the same value. This value, due to different measurement techniques, ranges between 6.001 and 6.017 angstrom (Earley, 1950). Since there is no brief description on penroseite's structure, it almost have the same Pyrite subgroup structure (Earley, 1950). The type of bonds found in the Pyrite group is covalent, but not in penroseite. For example, pyrite FeS_{2}, which has the same structure as penroseite and is thought to have similar coordination, has one Fe atom surrounded by six atoms of S, an octahedral coordination. On the other hand, the S atom is surrounded by 4 Fe atoms in a tetrahedral configuration (Jaffe, 1988). This might give an idea of how the atoms are arranged in penroseite in the absence of a real structure determination due to the undefined composition of the mineral.
