= Oosterboschite =

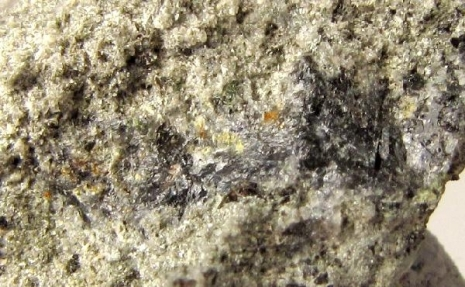
- Black Oosterboschite with trogtalite, cuprosklodowskite, and quartz from the Musonoi mine. From the Howard Belsky collection.

General
- Category: Selenide minerals
- Formula: (Pd,Cu)_{7}Se_{5}
- IMA symbol: Oos
- Strunz classification: 2.BC.10
- Dana classification: 2.16.15.2
- Crystal system: Orthorhombic; Unknown space group
- Unit cell: a = 10.42, b = 10.6, c = 14.43, Z = 8

Identification
- Colour: Creamy yellow-white
- Crystal habit: Anhedral grains
- Mohs scale hardness: 5
- Luster: Metallic
- Streak: Black
- Diaphaneity: Opaque
- Density: 8.48 (calculated)
- Ultraviolet fluorescence: None
- Solubility: Insoluble

Oosterboschite is a rare selenide mineral with the formula (Pd,Cu)_{7}Se_{5}. It crystallises in the orthorhombic crystal system. It has a creamy yellow colour and a Moh's hardness of 5. It is often found as grains with no clear shape. The crystals are opaque and often no bigger than 0.4 mm.

== Occurrence ==
The mineral was approved by the IMA in 1970, after being discovered in the Musonoi Cu–Co mine, near Kolwezi, Katanga Province, Congo. It was later also discovered at the Copper Hills prospect, East Pilbara, Australia, and at Hope’s Nose, Torquay, Devon, England. It is often found in the oxidation zones of the mines, together with verbeekite, trogtalite, selenian digenite, covellite, gold, and chrisstanleyite. It was named after Robert Oosterbosch, a Belgian mining engineer that was very active in the Katanga region, where the type locality is also located.

== See also ==
- List of minerals
- List of minerals named after people
