= Trogtalite =

Sulfide mineral

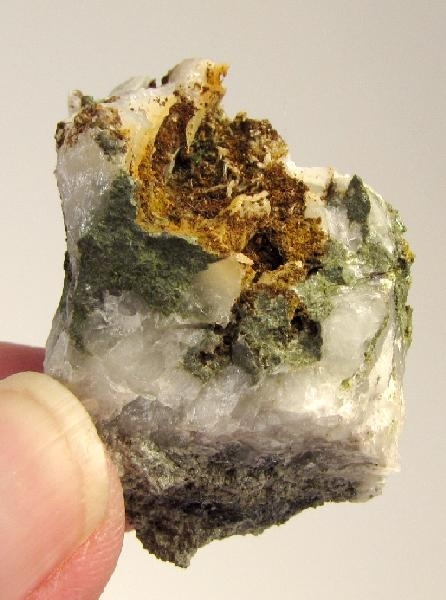
- Piece of oosterboschite with cuprosklodowskite, quartz, and brown oxidized trogtalite from the Musonoi mine. From the Howard Belsky collection.

General
- Category: Selenide minerals
- Formula: CoSe_{2}
- IMA symbol: Trg
- Strunz classification: 2.EB.05a
- Dana classification: 2.12.1.5
- Crystal system: Cubic
- Crystal class: Diploidal (m3̅); H-M symbol: (2/m 3̅)
- Space group: Pa3̅

Identification
- Color: Rose-violet
- Crystal habit: Irregular grains
- Mohs scale hardness: 3.5–5.5
- Luster: Metallic
- Diaphaneity: Opaque
- Density: 7.12 (calculated) 7.09 (synthetic)
- Pleochroism: None
- Ultraviolet fluorescence: None
- Solubility: Insoluble
- Common impurities: Cu, Pd

Trogtalite is a rare selenide mineral with the formula CoSe_{2.} It crystallizes in the cubic system and is part of the pyrite group, consisting of Co^{2+} and Se_{2}^{2−} ions. It has a rose-violet colour and its crystals are opaque. It often occurs as grains. It was thought to be dimorphous with hastite, but this was discredited in 2009. Hastite turned out to be the iron selenide mineral ferroselite. It forms a solid solution series with kruťaite.

== Occurrence ==
Trogtalite was first found in 1955 in Trogtal quarry, Lautenthal, Harz Mountains, Germany, after which it was also named. It often occurs intergrown with clausthalite grains at this locality. It has also been found in the Musonoi Cu–Co mine, Kolwezi, Katanga Province, Congo and in Argentina, in Tuminico, Sierra de Cacho, and in Los Llantenes, La Rioja Province. It is often found together with clausthalite, ferroselite, bornhardtite, native selenium, gold, and oosterboschite.

== See also ==
- List of minerals
