= Sengierite =

Oxide and hydroxide mineral

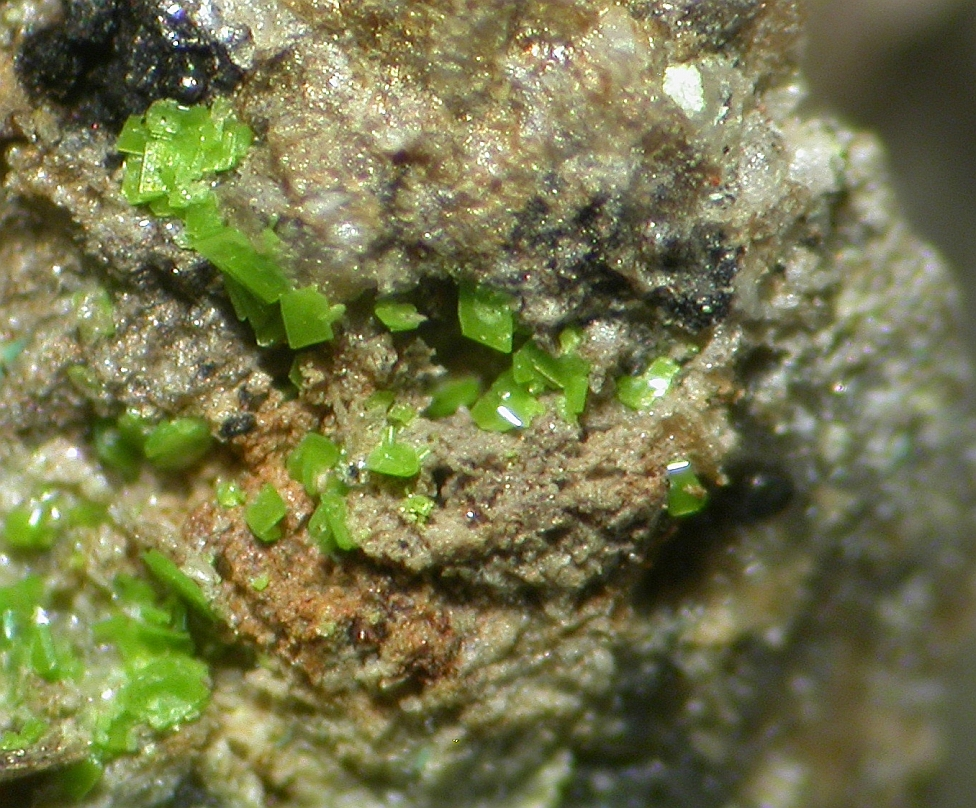

General
- Category: Oxide and Hydroxide
- Formula: Cu_{2}(OH)_{2}[UO_{2}|VO_{4}]_{2}·6H_{2}O
- IMA symbol: Sgi
- Crystal system: Monoclinic
- Space group: Monoclinic 2/m

Identification
- Color: Olive-green, yellowish green
- Crystal habit: Flattened thin plates, coatings
- Cleavage: Perfect on {001}
- Tenacity: Brittle
- Mohs scale hardness: 2.5
- Luster: Adamantine, vitreous
- Streak: Light green
- Diaphaneity: Transparent
- Specific gravity: 4.05
- Density: 4.05 g/cm^{3} (measured); 4.1 g/cm^{3} (calculated)
- Refractive index: nα = 1.760 – 1.770 nβ = 1.920 – 1.940 nγ = 1.940 – 1.970
- Pleochroism: X: Bluish green, Y: Olive-green, Z: Yellowish green to colorless
- 2V angle: Measured: 37° to 39°, Calculated: 36°
- Other characteristics: Radioactive

Sengierite is a rare oxide and hydroxide mineral, chemically a copper and uranyl vanadate, belonging to the carnotite group. Its chemical formula is Cu_{2}(OH)_{2}[UO_{2}|VO_{4}]_{2}·6H_{2}O.

Sengierite was first discovered at the Luiswishi Mine about 20 kilometres (12 mi) north of Lubumbashi in Katanga Province in the Democratic Republic of the Congo and was first described in 1949 by Johannes F. Vaes and Paul F. Kerr, the mineral was named after Edgar Sengier (1879–1963), a former director of the Union Minière du Haut Katanga.

== Bibliography ==
- Palache, P.; Berman H.; Frondel, C. (1960). "Dana's System of Mineralogy, Volume II: Halides, Nitrates, Borates, Carbonates, Sulfates, Phosphates, Arsenates, Tungstates, Molybdates, Etc. (Seventh Edition)" John Wiley and Sons, Inc., New York, pp. 1047–1048.
