= HGSE =

HGSE may refer to:

- Mercury selenide (HgSe)
- Harvard Graduate School of Education
