= Tyrrellite =

Selenide mineral

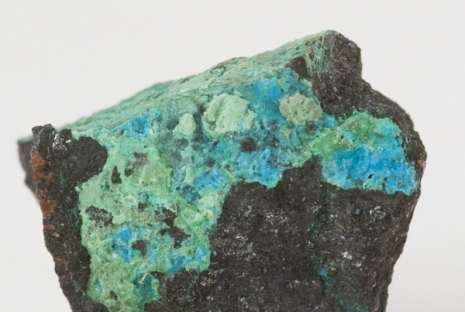

General
- Category: Selenide mineral Thiospinel group (Spinel structural group)
- Formula: Cu(Co,Ni)_{2}Se_{4}
- IMA symbol: Ty
- Strunz classification: 2.DA.05
- Crystal system: Isometric
- Crystal class: Hexoctahedral (m3̅m); H-M symbol: (4/m 3̅ 2/m)
- Space group: Fd3̅m
- Unit cell: a= 10.005 Å; Z = 8

Identification
- Color: light bronze
- Crystal habit: granular
- Cleavage: {001} Distinct
- Fracture: conchoidal
- Tenacity: brittle
- Mohs scale hardness: 3.5
- Luster: metallic
- Streak: black
- Diaphaneity: Opaque
- Specific gravity: 6.6 ± 0.2

Tyrrellite is a selenide mineral that has a chemical formula of Cu(Co,Ni)_{2}Se_{4}. It has been found in the Goldfields District in northern Saskatchewan, as well as in the Petrovice deposit, Czech Republic. It is named after the Canadian geologist Joseph Burr Tyrrell. Joseph Tyrrell was one of the first geologists from the Geological Survey of Canada to do research in the Goldfields District.

== Crystallography ==
Tyrrellite is isometric, meaning that crystallographically, it has three axes of equal length perpendicular to one another. It belongs to the space group, Fd3m. Because tyrrellite is isometric, it is also isotropic. Isotropic minerals are defined as follows: when light passes through an isometric mineral, the light moves in all directions with equal velocity. In contrast, for anisotropic minerals, the velocity of light passing through the mineral varies with crystallographic direction. Tyrrellite displays a light bronze color when viewed in plane polarized light. Because tyrrellite is isotropic, the light bronze color will remain constant as the mineral is rotated and viewed from different crystallographic angles. When viewed under cross polarized light, tyrrellite displays total extinction, a characteristic trait of isotropic minerals.

== Discovery and occurrence ==
It was first described in 1953 for an occurrence in the Goldfields District, Saskatchewan, while the second occurrence was reported in Petrovice deposit, Czech Republic. In general, tyrrellite is veined, embayed and replaced by umangite, a primary mineral of deposits in which tyrrellite is found. The relative scarcity and unique occurrences of tyrrellite can give geologists considerable insight into the circumstances under which the parent rock formed.
