= Terbium monoselenide =

Identifiers
CAS Number	12039-51-9
3D model (JSmol)	Interactive image
ECHA InfoCard	100.031.709
EC Number	234-894-0
PubChem CID	162004698
CompTox Dashboard (EPA)	DTXSID7065207
- InChI: InChI=1S/Se.Tb Key: YSRGWAUEOMDLSC-UHFFFAOYSA-N
- SMILES: [Se].[Tb]

Properties
Chemical formula	SeTb
Molar mass	237.896 g·mol^{−1}
Appearance	yellow-red solid

Hazards
- GHS labelling
Pictograms	(GHS06: Toxic) (GHS08: Health hazard) (GHS09: Environmental hazard)
Signal word	Danger
Hazard statements	H301, H331, H373, H410
- Except where otherwise noted, data are given for materials in their standard state (at 25 °C [77 °F], 100 kPa). Infobox references

Terbium monoselenide is an inorganic compound, with the chemical formula of TbSe. It is one of the selenides of terbium. It is a yellow-red solid.

== Preparation ==
Terbium monoselenide can be prepared by reacting terbium and selenium:

Tb + Se → TbSe

== Properties ==
Terbium monoselenide has the sodium chloride crystal structure, with space group Fm3m.

== Reactions ==
It can undergo a peritectic reaction in thallium monoselenide to generate TlTbSe_{2}:

TlSe + TbSe → TlTbSe_{2}
