= Edgar Sengier =

Belgian mining director (1879–1963)

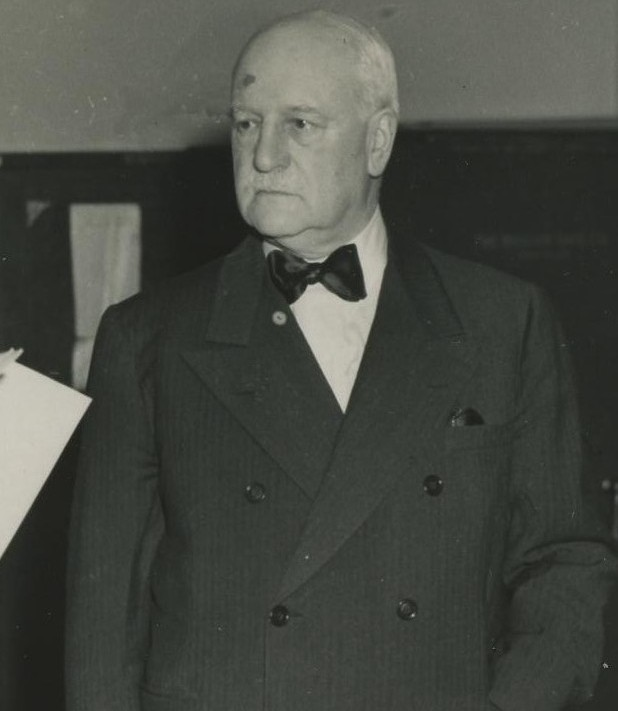
- Born: Edgar Edouard Bernard Sengier; 9 October 1879; Kortrijk, West Flanders, Belgium
- Died: 26 July 1963 (aged 83); Cannes, Alpes-Maritimes, France
- Education: University of Leuven
- Occupations: Mining engineer, director
- Employer: Union Minière du Haut Katanga
- Known for: Manhattan Project uranium supply
- Awards: Commander of the Order of the Belgian Crown (1945); Grand Officer of the Royal Order of the Lion (1945); Medal for Merit

Edgar Edouard Bernard Sengier (9 October 1879 – 26 July 1963) was a Belgian mining engineer and director of the Union Minière du Haut Katanga mining company that operated in the Belgian Congo during World War II.

Sengier is credited with giving the American government access to much of the uranium necessary for the Manhattan Project, much of which was already stored in a Staten Island warehouse due to his foresight to stockpile the ore to prevent it from falling into a possible enemy's hands.

For his actions he became the first non-American civilian to be awarded the Medal for Merit by the United States government.

== Early life ==
Born in Kortrijk, Sengier graduated in 1903 as a mining engineer from the University of Leuven and joined the Union Minière du Haut Katanga (UMHK) in 1911 as it was beginning to exploit copper mines in Katanga Province in the Belgian Congo. The UMHK was owned jointly by the Société Générale de Belgique, a Belgian investment company, and the government of the Belgian Congo.

== World War II ==
In May 1939, Sengier, then director of both the Société Générale and the UMHK, learned about the potential of uranium from English chemist Sir Henry Tizard, who warned him that he held "something which may mean a catastrophe to your country and mine if this material were to fall into the hands of a possible enemy." Shortly thereafter, he was approached by a group of French scientists led by Frédéric Joliot-Curie, who asked whether Sengier would be willing to participate in their efforts to create a uranium fission bomb. Although he agreed to provide the necessary ore, the project floundered when France was invaded by Germany. Sengier understood that uranium, a by-product that had until then been stored without being used, could become a crucial resource in times of war.

Uranium was discovered in Shinkolobwe as early as 1915, and extraction began in 1921. Uranium ore from Shinkolobwe was very rich (it contained up to 65% of uranium); in comparison, Canadian ore contained only 0.02%. In September 1940, Sengier ordered that half of the uranium stock available in Africa—about 1,050 tons—be secretly dispatched to New York. At the start of the war, Sengier himself traveled to New York to conduct Union Minière worldwide operations from there. At first, the UMHK's uranium stockpile remained in a Staten Island warehouse.

=== Manhattan Project ===
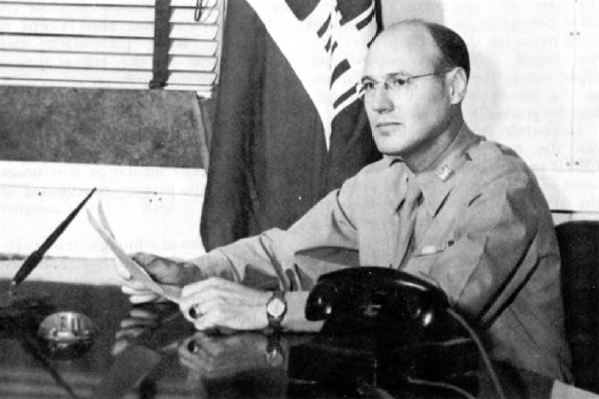
Kenneth Nichols in 1945

In September 1942, Lieutenant Colonel Kenneth Nichols met Sengier in his New York office. Nichols had been ordered to find uranium by the head of the Manhattan Project, General Leslie Groves. He asked if the Union Minière could supply uranium ore, and Sengier's answer became history: "You can have the ore now. It is in New York, a thousand tons of it. I was waiting for your visit." Nichols had heard of the ore from the State Department and Louis Rosen, but was surprised at the amount: 1,200 tons, of which 100 tons was to go to Canada immediately for refining by Eldorado Mining and Refining in Port Hope, Ontario.

Nichols and Sengier negotiated a contract, and the Staten Island stockpile was transferred to the United States Army. Since Tizard had informed him about uranium's potential a couple of years earlier, Sengier had a pretty good idea why Nichols had shown up to inquire about his ore deposits, something Nichols elaborated on during a 1965 Voices of the Manhattan Project interview by the journalist Stephane Groueff:

He had been following some of the work done by the French scientists before the war, and he knew the importance of the uranium as a possibility. Sengier knew what the hell we were doing. He just said, "I think I know what you’re doing, but you don’t need to tell me. Just assure me it’s for military purposes."

In his 1962 book about the Manhattan Project, Now It Can Be Told, Groves wrote that "as a Belgian, Sengier appreciated fully the absolute necessity of an Allied victory." Nichols, when questioned about Sengier's motives, stated:

I think it was partly patriotic, partly commercial. Their main market at that time was radium, and they sold about 300 tons a year of uranium to the ceramics industry for coloring. I think his main interest was probably commercial, to have a radium supply in the US, in case Europe was overrun, as it was. He had shipped some stuff from the Congo to Belgium, which was captured by the Germans and Patton finally rescued it. You can get the story of that from Groves. Shipped a big bulk of it to the US, and stored in Staten Island. I think he realized it had a possible military significance, but also had a commercial significance. He was interested—I think he had some indications from other people that this project was continuing in the US, so I think he was interested in getting it into the right hands.

The Shinkolobwe mine had been closed since 1937, and had fallen into disrepair and flooded. The United States Army sent a squad from its Corps of Engineers to restore the mine, expand the aerodromes in Léopoldville and Elisabethville, and build a port in Matadi, on the Congo River. The army also secured the remaining ore (3000 tons) in Shinkolobwe, which was shipped to the United States. In his 1987 book, The Road to Trinity, Nichols wrote:

Our best source, the Shinkolobwe mine, represented a freak occurrence in nature. It contained a tremendously rich lode of uranium pitchblende. Nothing like it has ever again been found. The ore already in the United States contained 65 percent U_{3}O_{8}, while the pitchblende aboveground in the Congo amounted to a thousand tons of 65 percent ore, and the waste piles of ore contained two thousand tons of 20 percent U_{3}O_{8}. To illustrate the uniqueness of Sengier's stockpile, after the war the MED and the AEC considered ore containing three-tenths of 1 percent as a good find. Without Sengier’s foresight in stockpiling ore in the United States and aboveground in Africa, we simply would not have had the amounts of uranium needed to justify building the large separation plants and the plutonium reactors.

The agreement between the United States, the United Kingdom, and Belgium lasted ten years and continued after the war. The uranium agreements in part explain Belgium's relative ease in rebuilding its economy after the war, as the country had no debt with the major financial powers.

== Personal life ==
Sengier was described by author John Gunther in his book Inside Africa as "a tallish man, somewhat portly, with pale skin, white hands, a fringe of shinily white hair, and a short silver mustache clipped with sharp neatness", further stating that he "conveys that pleasant sense of benevolence which comes to an extremely successful man of affairs, after his major work is done."

Nichols described meeting Sengier for the first time in 1942: "At that time he was in his sixties, and he always impressed me as very white. Sort of a plump man and very sparse hair" and "a very pale face", and that he was "a very abrupt guy", but "just as polite."

Edgar Sengier remained director of the Société Générale and the Union Minière until 1949. He remained on the company's administrative board until 1960, before retiring in Cannes, where he died in 1963.

== Recognition ==
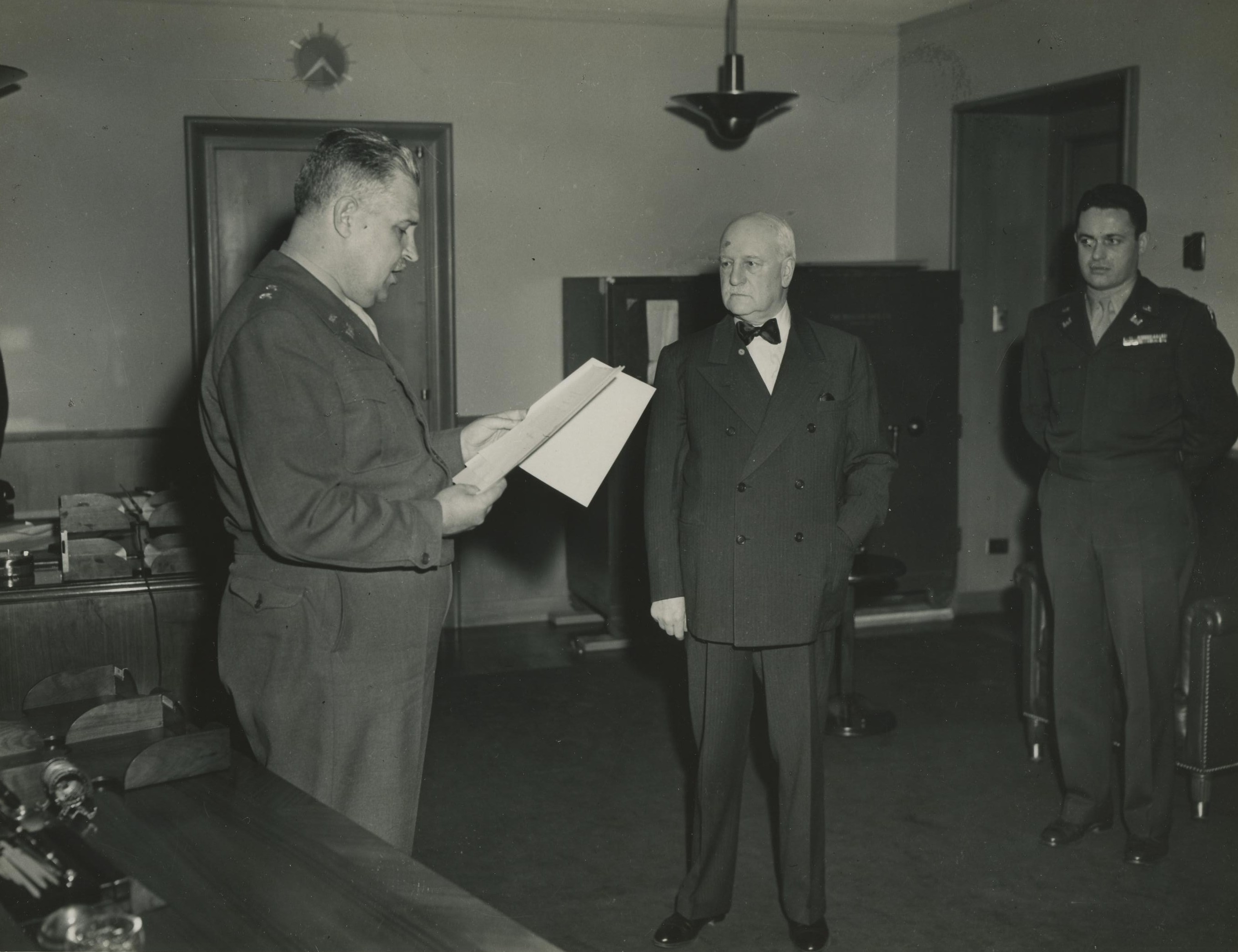
Sengier receiving the Medal for Merit, 1946

In 1946, Sengier returned to the United States and was awarded the Medal for Merit for his contribution to the Allied victory by General Groves at a private ceremony in his Washington office, receiving the distinction of becoming the first non-American civilian to be awarded the medal. Due to restrictions on wartime information at the time, the initial citation merely mentioned his "services in supplying material". However, the official statement made note of Sengier's "sound judgment, initiative, resourcefulness and unfailing cooperation" which "contributed greatly to the success of the atomic bomb project". Groves noted:

It was a distinct pleasure for me after the war to recommend the award of the Medal of Merit, the highest civilian award made by our government, to Edgar Sengier for his great services to the United States, to Belgium and the free world in making available to us adequate supplies of Belgian Congo uranium. It was also my pleasure to present this award at a ceremony in my office in Washington. Security restrictions had not yet been lifted on this phase of the MED operations and the ceremony was private and unpublicized. It has always been a source of regret to me that Sengier’s services, and particularly his foresight, could not receive full public recognition at the time.

Despite official recognition, Sengier was content to remain unknown and successfully went to considerable lengths to preserve his anonymity. According to John Gunther "probably not one American in a hundred thousand has ever heard the name Edgar Sengier, nor is he well known in Europe outside of a limited circle. So far as I know, no photograph of him has ever appeared in an American newspaper or magazine of wide circulation ..."

Sengierite, a radioactive mineral discovered in Congo in 1948, was named in his honor.

=== Awards and decorations ===
Sengier received numerous awards for his accomplishments.

Belgium
Commander of the Order of the Crown
Grand Officer of the Royal Order of the Lion
Officer of the Order of Leopold
Officer of the Order of the African Star
Silver Medal of Belgian Gratitude
France
Commander of the Order of the Legion of Honour
Medal of French Gratitude

Luxembourg
Commander of the Order of the Oak Crown
Romania
Commander of the Order of the Star of Romania
Sweden
Commander of the Royal Order of Vasa
United Kingdom
Honorary Knight Commander of the Order of the British Empire
United States
Medal for Merit

== See also ==
- Belgian Congo in World War II
