= Laurite =

Ruthenium sulfide mineral

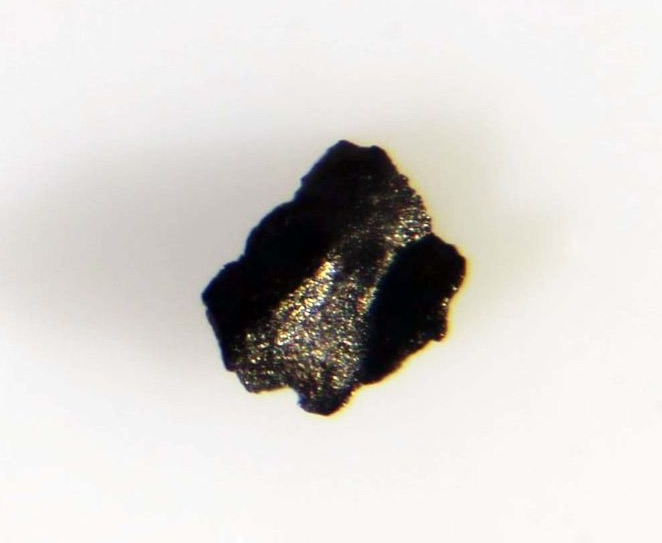

General
- Category: Sulfide mineral
- Formula: RuS_{2}
- Strunz classification: 2.EB.05a
- Crystal system: Cubic
- Crystal class: Diploidal (m3̅); H-M symbol: (P 2/m 3̅)
- Space group: Pa3̅
- Unit cell: a = 5.61 Å; Z = 4

Structure
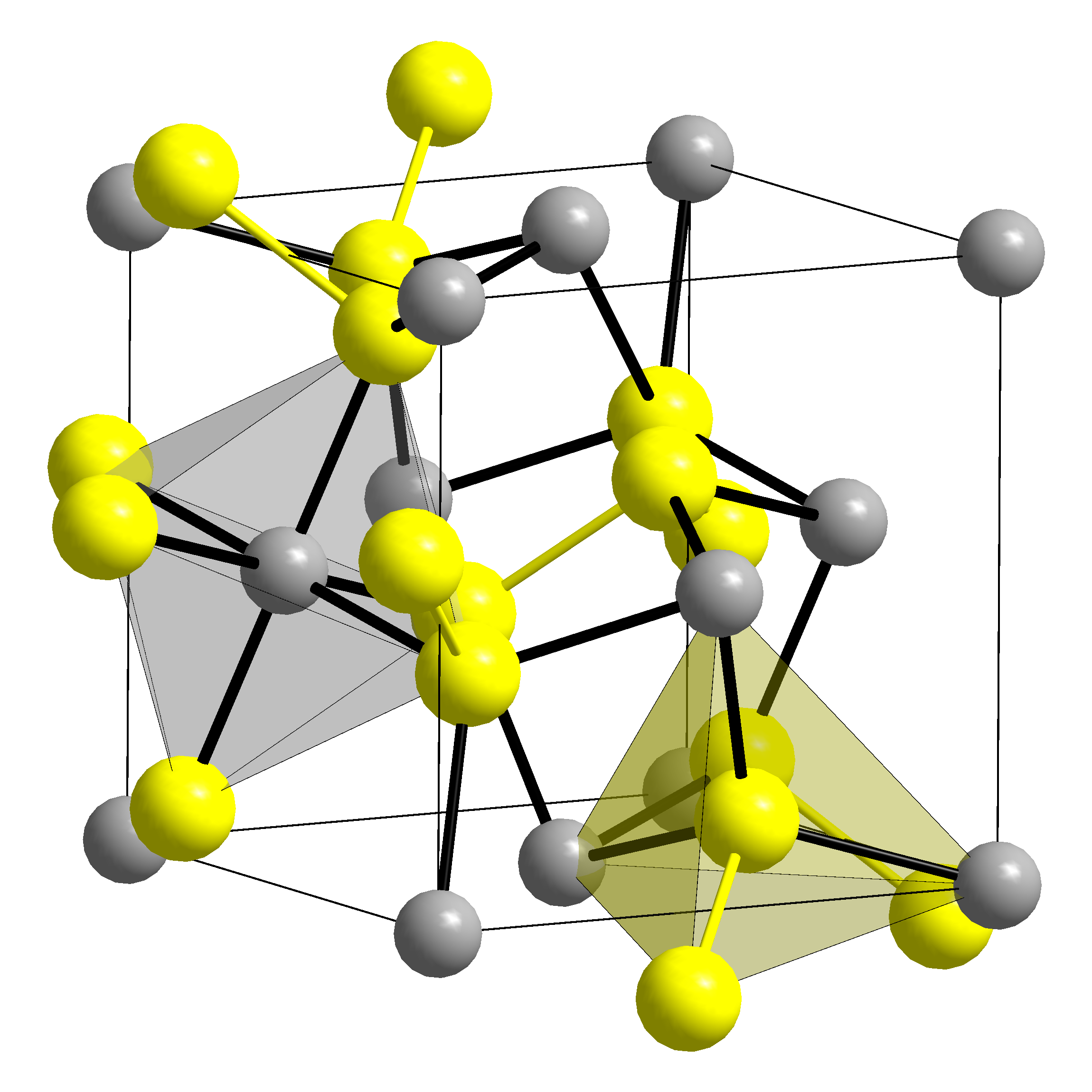
- Crystal structure of Laurite; S Ru

Identification
- Color: Iron-black; white to gray or bluish in polished section
- Crystal habit: As octahedral, cubic, and pyritohedral crystals or as rounded grains and inclusions
- Cleavage: Perfect on {111}
- Fracture: Subconchoidal
- Tenacity: Brittle
- Mohs scale hardness: 7.5
- Luster: Metallic
- Streak: Dark gray
- Diaphaneity: Opaque
- Specific gravity: 6.43
- Density: 6.43 g/cm3 (Measured) 6.39 g/cm3 (Calculated)
- Optical properties: Isotropic and opaque

Laurite is an opaque black, metallic ruthenium sulfide mineral with formula: RuS_{2}. It crystallizes in the isometric system. It is in the pyrite structural group. Though it's been found in many localities worldwide, it is extremely rare.

Laurite has a Mohs hardness of 7.5 and a specific gravity of 6.43. It can contain osmium, rhodium, iridium, and iron substituting for the ruthenium. The sulfur is present as the disulfide ion, S^{2−}_{2}, so the ruthenium is in the Ru(II) oxidation state.

== Discovery and occurrence ==
It was discovered in 1866 in Borneo, Malaysia and named for Laurie, the wife of Charles A. Joy, an American chemist. It occurs in ultramafic magmatic cumulate deposits and sedimentary placer deposits derived from them. It occurs associated with cooperite, braggite, sperrylite, other minerals of the platinum group elements and chromite.

Synthetic RuS_{2} is a highly active catalyst for hydrodesulfurization.
