= Cattierite =

Cobalt sulfide mineral

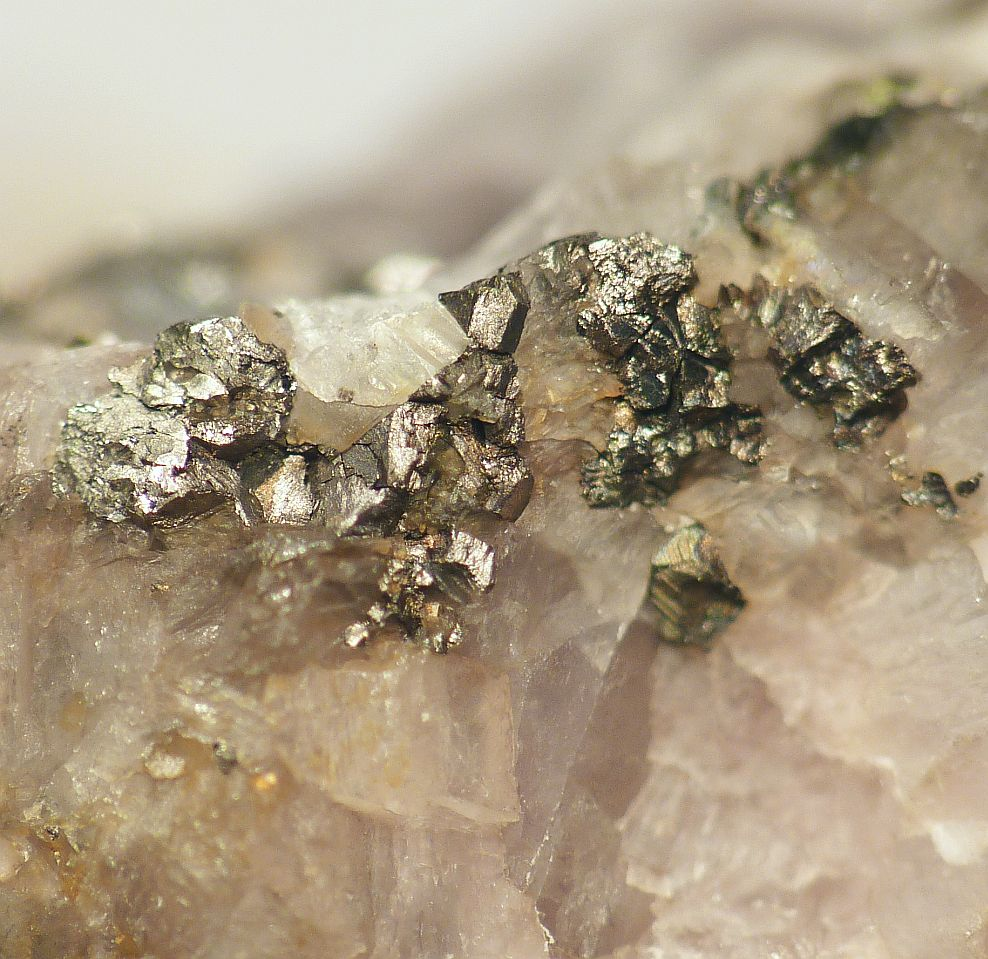
- Cattierite crystals in dolomite matrix

General
- Category: Sulfide mineral
- Formula: CoS_{2}
- IMA symbol: Cat
- Strunz classification: 2.EB.05a
- Crystal system: Cubic
- Crystal class: Diploidal (m3̅); H-M symbol: (2/m 3̅)
- Space group: Pa3̅
- Unit cell: a = 5.52 Å; Z = 4

Identification
- Color: Pink to grayish white
- Crystal habit: Cubic crystals and granular intergrowths
- Cleavage: Perfect on {001}
- Mohs scale hardness: 4
- Luster: Metallic
- Diaphaneity: Opaque
- Specific gravity: 4.82
- Optical properties: Isotropic

Cattierite (CoS_{2}) is a cobalt sulfide mineral found in the Democratic Republic of Congo. It was discovered together with the nickel sulfide vaesite by Johannes F. Vaes, a Belgian mineralogist and named after Felicien Cattier, who was chairman of the board of the Union Minière du Haut-Katanga.

The mineral belongs to the pyrite group, in which all minerals share the same building principle. The metal in the oxidation state +2 forms a sodium chloride structure together with the anion S_{2}^{2−}. This formalism recognizes that the sulfur atoms in pyrite occur in pairs with clear S-S bonds.

It occurs with pyrite, chalcopyrite and members of the linnaeite – polydymite group in ore deposits in carbonate rocks. In addition to the type locality in the Katanga district it is reported from Gansberg, Black Forest, Germany; near Filipstad, Varmland, Sweden; Bald Knob, near Sparta, Alleghany County, North Carolina and in the Fletcher mine of Reynolds County, Missouri.
