= Aurostibite =

Sulfide mineral

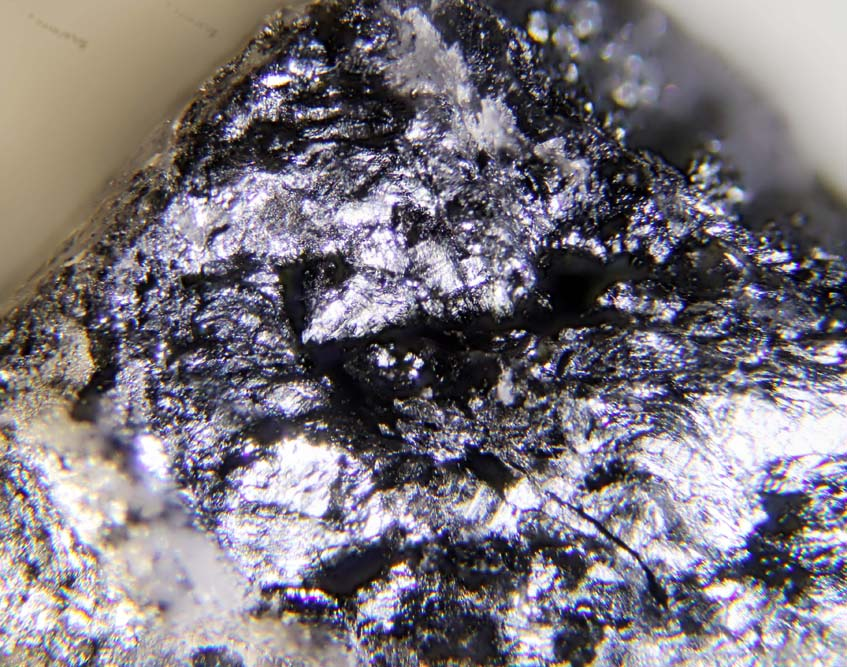
- Aurostibite found in the Czech Republic

General
- Category: Sulfide minerals
- Formula: AuSb_{2}
- Strunz classification: 2.EB.05a
- Crystal system: Isometric
- Crystal class: Diploidal (m3̅); H-M Symbol: (2/m 3̅)
- Space group: Pa3̅

Identification
- Formula mass: 440.47 g/mol
- Color: White to grey with bornite-like tarnish
- Cleavage: Indistinct
- Tenacity: Brittle
- Mohs scale hardness: 3
- Luster: metallic
- Diaphaneity: Opaque
- Specific gravity: 9.98

Aurostibite is an isometric gold antimonide mineral which is a member of the pyrite group. Aurostibite was discovered in 1952 and can be found in hydrothermal gold-quartz veins, in sulfur-deficient environments that contain other antimony minerals. The mineral can be found in Yellowknife in the Northwest Territories of Canada, and the Timiskaming District in Ontario, Canada. Antimonides are rare and are normally placed in the sulfide class by mineralogists.

== See also ==
- List of minerals
