= Umohoite =

Uranyl oxide mineral

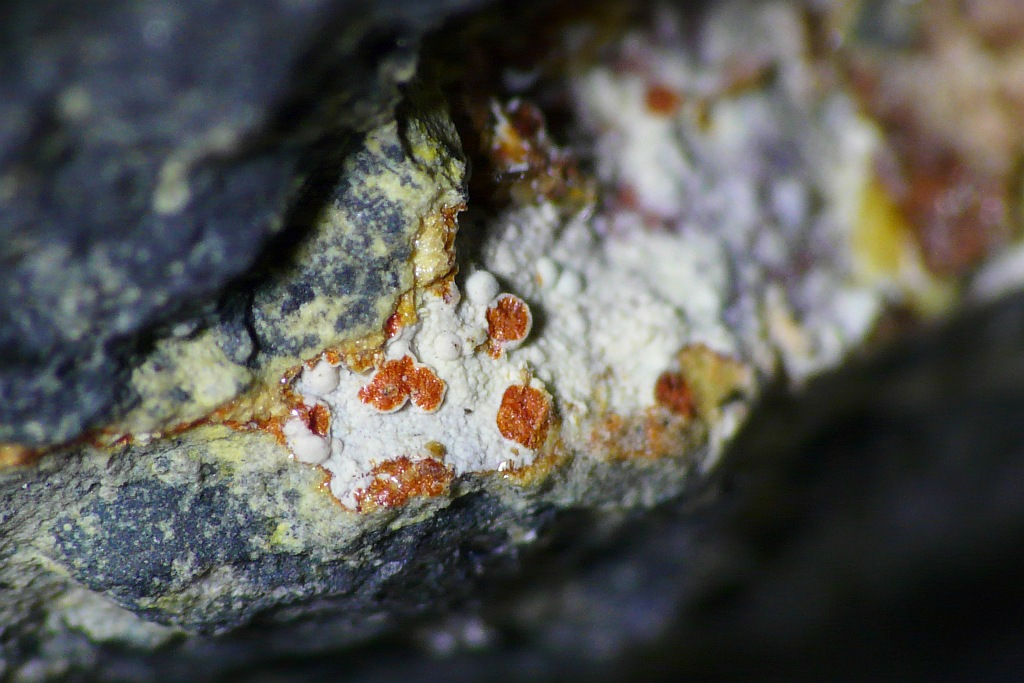

General
- Category: Oxide and Hydroxide
- Formula: (UO_{2})MoO_{4}·2H_{2}O
- IMA symbol: Umo
- Crystal system: Triclinic

Identification
- Color: Black, blue-black, dark green, orange-red
- Cleavage: Perfect on {001}
- Mohs scale hardness: 2
- Luster: Vitreous
- Streak: Blue gray
- Diaphaneity: Opaque
- Density: 4.53 - 4.66 g/cm3 (Measured) 4.49(3) g/cm3 (Calculated)
- Refractive index: nα = 1.660 nβ = 1.831 nγ = 1.915
- 2V angle: Measured: 65°, Calculated: 64°
- Other characteristics: Radioactive

Umohoite is a rare oxide and hydroxide mineral. The name of this mineral reflects its composition: uranyl (U), molybdate (Mo) and water (H_{2}O). Its chemical formula is (UO_{2})MoO_{4}·2H_{2}O.

Umohoite's type location is in Marysvale, the mineral was first described by Paul F. Kerr and G. P. Brophy in 1953.
