= Sperrylite =

Platinum arsenide mineral

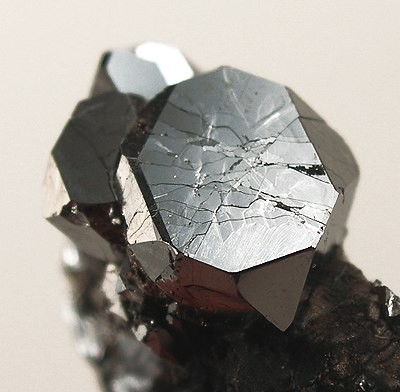

General
- Category: Arsenide mineral Pyrite group
- Formula: PtAs_{2}
- IMA symbol: Spy
- Strunz classification: 2.EB.05a
- Crystal system: Isometric
- Crystal class: Diploidal (m3̅); H-M symbol: (2/m 3̅)
- Space group: Pa3
- Unit cell: a = 5.967 Å, Z = 4

Identification
- Color: Tin white
- Crystal habit: Well-formed finely crystalline, massive to reniform
- Cleavage: Indistinct on {001}
- Fracture: Conchoidal
- Tenacity: Brittle
- Mohs scale hardness: 6–7
- Luster: Metallic
- Streak: Black
- Specific gravity: 10.58

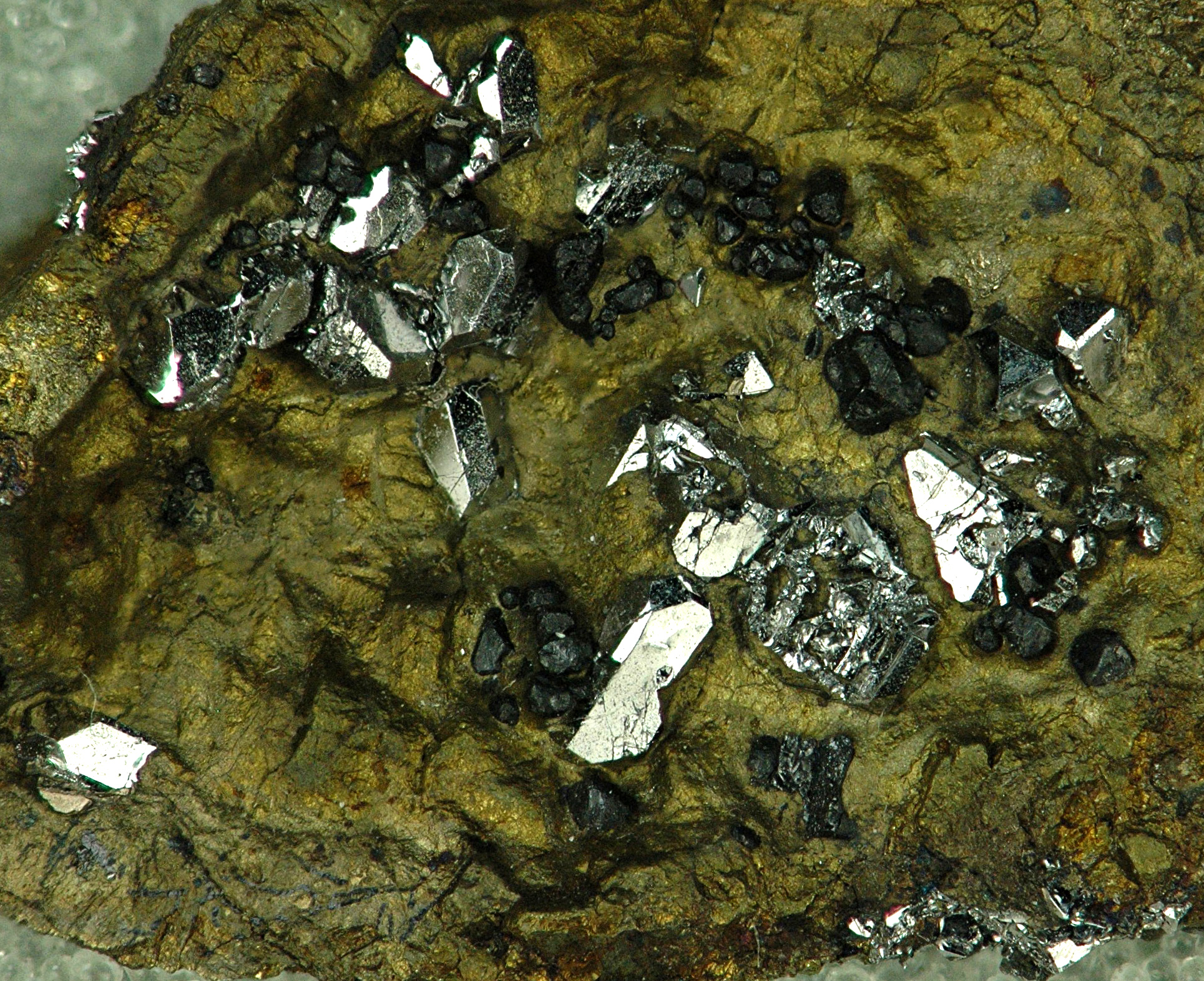
Sperrylite on chalcopyrite with magnetite, Oktyabersky Mine, Norilsk. Field of view 2.2 cm.

Sperrylite is a platinum arsenide mineral with the chemical formula PtAs_{2} and is an opaque metallic tin white mineral which crystallizes in the isometric system with the pyrite group structure. It forms cubic, octahedral or pyritohedral crystals in addition to massive and reniform habits. It has a Mohs hardness of 6–7 and a very high specific gravity of 10.6.

It was discovered by the American chemist Francis Louis Sperry in 1888-89 in ore from the Vermillion Mine, part of the Sudbury Basin discoveries, as he did a fire assay to determine the gold content of the ore for the Canadian Copper Company who were interested by the property.

The most important occurrence of sperrylite is in the nickel ore deposit of Sudbury Basin in Ontario, Canada. It also occurs in the layered igneous complex of the Bushveld region of South Africa and the Oktyabr'skoye copper-nickel deposit near Noril'sk, Russia.

== Geologic occurrence ==
Sperrylite is the most common platinum mineral, it generally occurs with a wide array of other unusual minerals, including cooperite [(Pt,Pd,Ni)S], laurite [RuS_{2}], kotulskite [Pd(Te,Bi)], merenskyite [(Pd,Pt)(Te,Bi)_{2}], iridium-osmium (Ir-Os) alloys, sudburyite [(Pd,Ni)Sb], omeiite [(Os,Ru)As_{2}], testibiopalladite [PdTe(Sb,Te)], and niggliite [PtSn], to name a few. It does not readily decompose through normal weathering processes and, consequently, has been reported in widely scattered alluvial deposits.

It was first found as tiny crystals found with rhodolite garnet and corundum during alluvial gem mining in streams draining Mason Mountain, Macon County, North Carolina (Hidden 1898). Sperrylite has been identified in Finland from sulfide deposits generally associated with layered mafic-ultramafic complexes.

== Structure ==
Sperrylite belongs to the pyrite group of minerals and therefore it shares similar structure and crystal habits with them. Analyses typically show minor amounts of rhodium. Trace copper, iron, and antimony as well as intergrowths with Pt-Fe are reported from some occurrences. Sperrylite crystallizes in Pa3, with a =5.9681(l) A. (Szymański, 1979). It has very similar crystal structure as in platarsite (ideally PtAsS). Sperrylite crystals vary considerably in shape and size and are usually enclosed in a variety of host minerals. They are usually closely associated with basemetal sulfide. They are commonly at the edge and partially enclosed by pentlandite, pyrrhotite or chalcopyrite. Seabrook (2004).

Sperrylite is composed of loose aggregate of bright silver cubes, some with octahedral modifications. The grains are mostly anhedral, but a few euhedral grains could also be encountered. Sperrylite is formed by contact metamorphism, as in indicated by the development of triple point annealing contacts with pyrrhotite grains. The grains of sperrylite are surrounded by later veins of pyrite.

Sperrylite is cubic (2/m3) and is typically seen in well-developed cubes or cuboctahedra, some of which are so highly modified that crystal edges and corners appear rounded. (Nicol and Goldschmidt 1903) identified seventeen crystal forms exhibited by sperrylite, including four different trapezohedra, a trisoctahedron, five pyritohedra, and four diploids. Crystals to 2.5 cm have been reported.

Cell dimensions	a = 5.967, Z = 4; V = 212.46 Den(Calc)= 10.78
Crystal system	Isometric – Diploidal H-M Symbol (2/m 3) Space Group: P a3
X ray diffraction	By Intensity(I/Io): 1.801(1), 1.148(0.7), 2.98(0.6)
Forms	[1 0 2] [1 1 1] [1 0 0]

== Physical properties ==
Sperrylite is a tin-white mineral known for its brilliant metallic luster, with a grey to black streak. It has indistinct cleavage on {001} and a conchoidal fracture and is brittle. Its hardness is between 6 and 7, and it is quite dense with a calculated specific gravity of 10.78. It has an isometric crystal structure, conchoidal fracture, is non-magnetic and non-radioactive.

== Discovery ==
Sperrylite was first described by H. H. Wells in 1889 from material collected at the Vermilion mine in what is now the Sudbury district, Ontario, Canada. He named it for Francis L. Sperry, chief chemist with the Canadian Copper Company of Sudbury, who collected the original material in 1887 (Mitchell 1985). It occurred in weathered material with colorless transparent cassiterite [SnO_{2}], which is thought to have been derived from the oxidation of stannite [Cu_{2}(Fe,Zn)SnS_{4}].

== See also ==
- List of minerals
- List of minerals named after people
