= Bukovite =

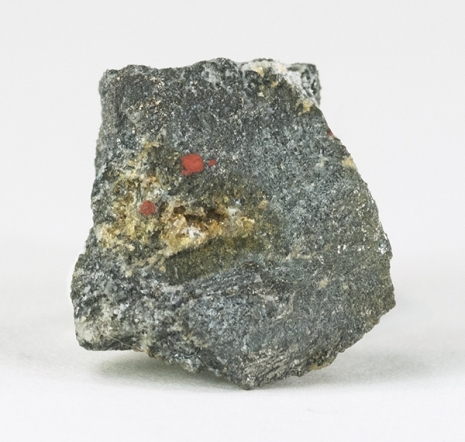
- Bukovite: metallic grayish-brown grains are noted by the two red dots

General
- Category: Selenide – Bukovite group
- Formula: Tl_{2}(CuFe)_{4}Se_{4}
- IMA symbol: Bko
- Strunz classification: 2.BD.30
- Dana classification: 2.5.5.2
- Crystal system: Tetragonal
- Crystal class: Ditetragonal dipyramidal (4/mmm); H-M symbol: (4/m 2/m 2/m)
- Space group: I4/mmm
- Unit cell: V = 216.58 Å^{3}

Identification
- Color: Grayish-brown
- Cleavage: Distinct/good: Good on {001} imperfect on {100}
- Mohs scale hardness: 2
- Luster: Metallic
- Diaphaneity: Opaque
- Specific gravity: 7.40 (calculated)

Bukovite is a rare selenide mineral with formula Tl_{2}Cu_{3}FeSe_{4}. It is a brown to black metallic mineral which crystallizes in the tetragonal system.

It was first described in 1971 for an occurrence in the Bukov uranium mine, Rožná deposit, Vysočina Region, Moravia, Czech Republic. It has also been reported in Skrikerum, near Tryserum, Kalmar, Sweden; near Vernet-la-Varenne, Puy-de-Dôme, France; and Tuminico, Sierra de Cacho, La Rioja Province, Argentina.

== See also ==
- Beraunite
