= Selenide =

Chemical compound containing selenium

A selenide is a chemical compound containing a selenium with oxidation number of −2. Similar to sulfide, selenides occur both as inorganic compounds and as organic derivatives, which are called organoselenium compound.

== Inorganic selenides ==
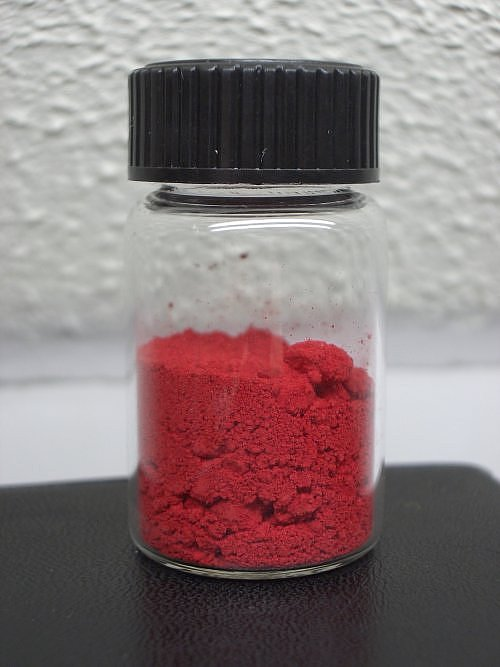
Sample of cadmium selenide, a pigment.

The parent inorganic selenide is hydrogen selenide (H_{2}Se). It is a colorless, malodorous, toxic gas. It dissolves in aqueous solution, to give the hydrogenselenide or biselenide ion HSe^{−}. At higher pH, selenide forms. Solutions of hydrogen selenide and selenide are oxidized by air to give elemental selenium:

2 SeH^{−} + O_{2} → 2 Se + 2 OH^{−}

Most elements form selenides. They sometimes have salt-like properties, e.g. sodium selenide, but most exhibit covalent bonding, e.g. molybdenum diselenide. Their properties are diverse, mirroring the diverse properties of the corresponding sulfides.

As indicated by the fact that only a few thousand tons of selenium are produced annually, the subset of selenium compounds called selenides find few applications. Commercially significant is zinc selenide, which is used in some infrared optics. Cadmium selenide is a pigment but its use has been declining because of environmental considerations. Copper indium selenide (CuInSe_{2}) has attractive potential for photovoltaic devices, but these applications have not been implemented widely. Similarly, quantum dots based on metal selenides have been extensively investigated for their distinctive spectral properties. Core-shell alloys of cadmium sulfide and selenide are of interest in imaging and phototherapy.

Many selenide minerals are known. Usually selenium partially substitutes for sulfide in many sulfide minerals. The degree of substitution is only of commercial interest for copper sulfide ores, in which case selenium is recovered as a by-product of copper refining. Some selenide minerals include ferroselite and umangite.

== Organic and biological selenides ==
Selenides are common in organic chemistry. They have two Se-C bonds, akin to organic sulfides. Examples include dimethyl selenide, selenomethionine, and Se-methylselenocysteine. Such compounds have few applications.

== Examples ==
- Gallium(II) selenide
- Indium(III) selenide
- Lead selenide
- Copper selenide

== See also ==
- Sulfoselenide
