= Berzelianite =

Sulfide mineral

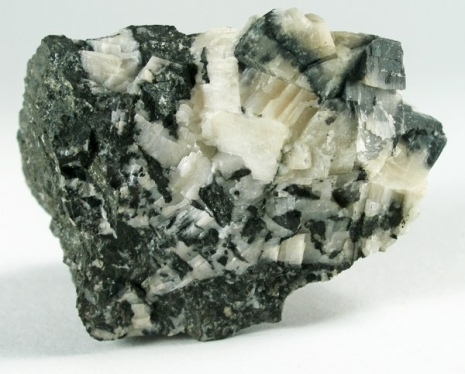
- Berzelianite included in calcite from the Skrikerum mine in Sweden.

General
- Category: Selenide minerals
- Formula: Cu_{2}Se
- IMA symbol: Brz
- Strunz classification: 2.BA.20
- Dana classification: 2.4.10.1
- Crystal system: Isometric

Identification
- Color: Silvery white, tarnishes easily
- Crystal habit: Dendritic crusts, fine-grained inclusions
- Cleavage: None
- Fracture: Uneven
- Tenacity: Slightly malleable
- Mohs scale hardness: 2.7
- Luster: Metallic
- Streak: Shining
- Diaphaneity: Opaque
- Density: 6.71 (measured) 7.28 (calculated)
- Ultraviolet fluorescence: None
- Common impurities: Ag

Berzelianite is a rare copper selenide mineral with the formula Cu_{2}Se. It occurs as thin dendritic crusts or as fine-grained inclusions. It crystallizes in the isometric system, unlike its dimorph, bellidoite, which crystallizes in the tetragonal system. The crystals are opaque and slightly malleable.

== Occurrence and name ==
Berzelianite was first identified at the Skrikerum Mine (also spelled as Skrickerum Mine) in Valdemarsvik, Östergötland, Sweden in 1850.

It was named by James Dwight Dana to honor Jöns Jakob Berzelius, a Swedish chemist who is seen as the father of analytical chemistry. He invented chemical symbol notation and discovered the elements cerium, selenium, silicon, and thorium.

Berzelianite often occurs together with eucairite, clausthalite, tiemannite, umangite, klockmannite, aguilarite, crookesite, athabascaite, stromeyerite, polybasite, pearceite, gold, uraninite, pyrite, marcasite, calcite.

== See also ==
- List of minerals
- List of minerals named after people
