= Mercury selenide =

Mercury(II) selenide
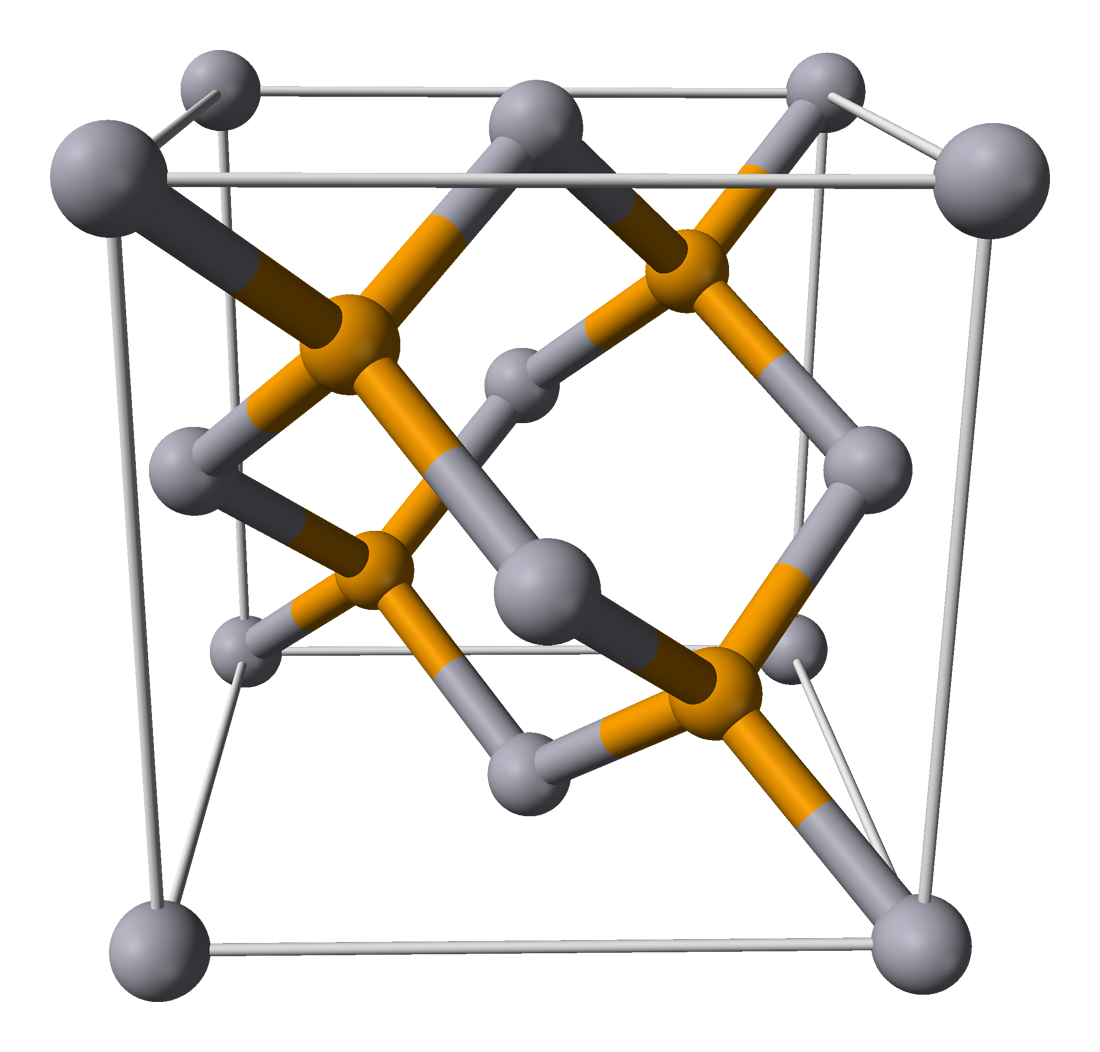
- Mercury(II) selenide unit cell

Names
- IUPAC name Mercury selenide

Identifiers
CAS Number	20601-83-6
3D model (JSmol)	Interactive image
ChemSpider	8014295
ECHA InfoCard	100.039.903
EC Number	243-910-5
PubChem CID	88609
CompTox Dashboard (EPA)	DTXSID8066630
- InChI: InChI=1S/Hg.Se Key: YQMLDSWXEQOSPP-UHFFFAOYSA-N; InChI=1S/Hg.Se
- SMILES: [Se]=[Hg]

Properties
Chemical formula	HgSe
Molar mass	279.55 g/mol
Appearance	grey-black solid
Odor	odorless
Density	8.266 g/cm^{3}
Melting point	1,000 °C; 1,830 °F; 1,270 K
Solubility in water	insoluble

Structure
Crystal structure	sphalerite

Thermochemistry
Heat capacity (C)	178 J kg^{−1} K^{−1}
Std enthalpy of formation (Δ_{f}H^{⦵}_{298})	247 kJ/mol

Hazards
- GHS labelling
Pictograms	(GHS06: Toxic) (GHS08: Health hazard) (GHS09: Environmental hazard)
Signal word	Danger
Hazard statements	H300, H310, H330, H373, H410
Precautionary statements	P260, P262, P264, P270, P271, P273, P280, P284, P301+P310, P302+P350, P304+P340, P310, P314, P320, P321, P330, P361, P363, P391, P403+P233, P405, P501
NFPA 704 (fire diamond)	4 0 1
Flash point	Non-flammable

Related compounds
Other anions	Mercury oxide Mercury sulfide Mercury telluride
Other cations	Zinc selenide Cadmium selenide
- Except where otherwise noted, data are given for materials in their standard state (at 25 °C [77 °F], 100 kPa). verify (what is ?) Infobox references

Mercury selenide (HgSe; sometimes mercury(II) selenide) is a chemical compound of mercury and selenium. It is a grey-black crystalline solid semi-metal with a sphalerite structure. The lattice constant is 0.608 nm.

HgSe occurs naturally as the mineral Tiemannite, and is a component of the "intimate mixture" of HgSe and Se known as HgSe_{2}.

Along with other II-VI compounds, colloidal nanocrystals of HgSe can be formed.

== Applications ==
- Selenium is used in filters in some steel plants to remove mercury from exhaust gases. The solid product formed is HgSe.
- HgSe can be used as an ohmic contact to wide-gap II-VI semiconductors such as zinc selenide or zinc oxide.

== Toxicity ==
Toxic hydrogen selenide fumes can be evolved on exposure to acids. HgSe is non-toxic as long as it is not ingested due to its insolubility.

HgSe is forms large insoluble clusters with proteins during digestion, and a very precise co-administration of selenium during mercury ingestion has shown to reduce the resulting intoxication. The effect is too finicky for any practical use, but selenium's ability to complex mercury has been proposed to explain why relatively high mercury levels do not intoxicate deep-sea fish.

== See also ==
- Mercury sulfide
- Mercury telluride
- Cadmium selenide
- Zinc selenide
