= Zinc selenide =

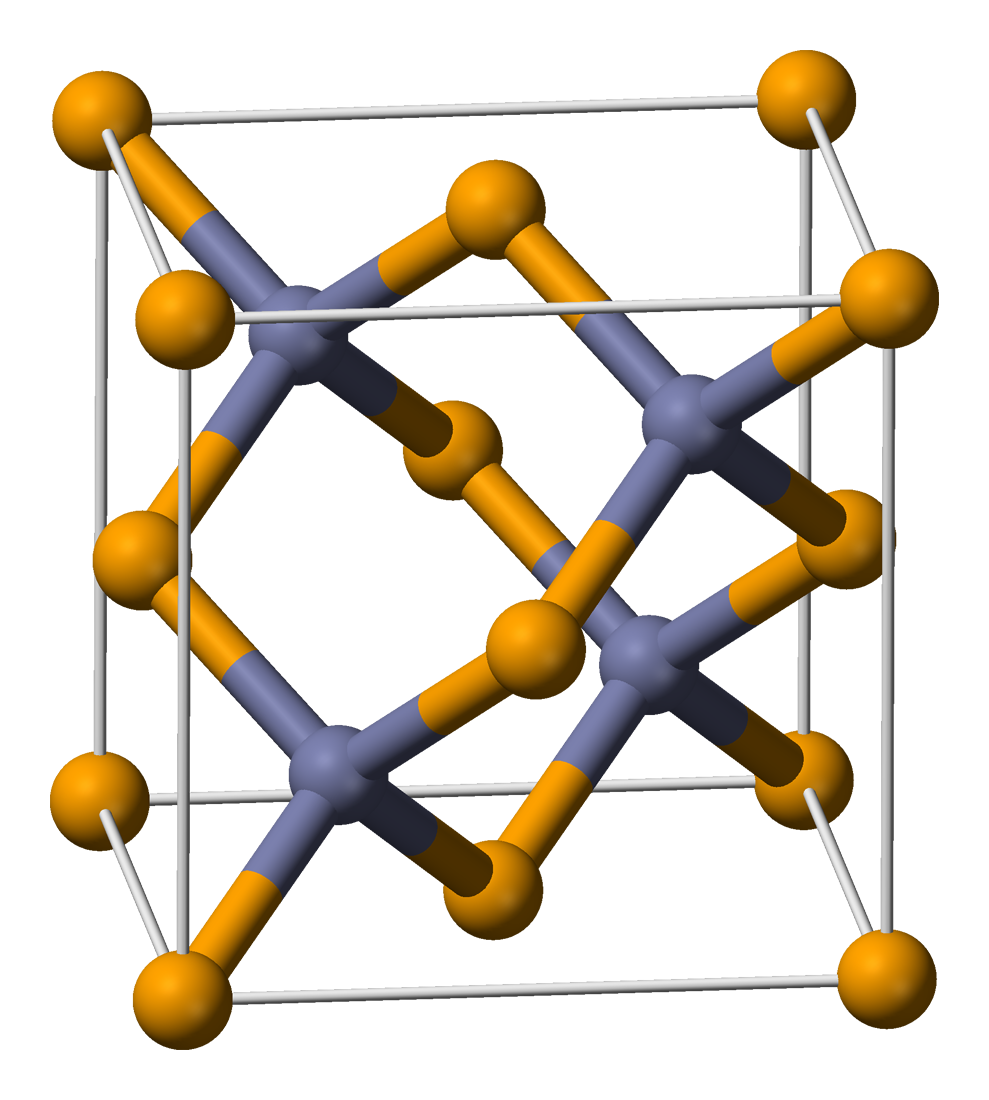
- Zinc selenide

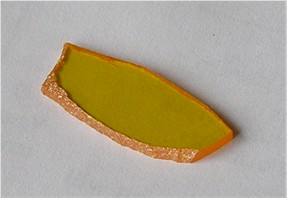

Names
- Other names Zinc selenide Stilleite

Identifiers
CAS Number	1315-09-9
3D model (JSmol)	zincblende structure: Interactive image; wurtzite structure: Interactive image; wurtzite structure: Interactive image
ChemSpider	7969585
ECHA InfoCard	100.013.873
EC Number	215-259-7
PubChem CID	4298215
UNII	OWX23150D5
CompTox Dashboard (EPA)	DTXSID80893851
- InChI: InChI=1S/Se.Zn Key: SBIBMFFZSBJNJF-UHFFFAOYSA-N
- SMILES: zincblende structure: [SeH+2]12[ZnH2-2][SeH+2]3[ZnH2-2][SeH+2]([ZnH-2]14)[ZnH-2]1[Se+2]5([ZnH-2]38)[Zn-2]26[SeH+2]2[ZnH-2]([Se+2]4)[SeH+2]1[ZnH2-2][SeH+2]3[ZnH-2]2[Se+2][ZnH-2]([SeH+2]6[ZnH-2]([SeH+2])[SeH+2]68)[SeH+2]([ZnH2-2]6)[ZnH-2]35; wurtzite structure: [ZnH2-2]1[Se+2]47[ZnH-2]2[Se+2][ZnH-2]3[Se+2]8([ZnH2-2][SeH+2]([ZnH2-2]4)[ZnH2-2]6)[ZnH-2]4[Se+2][ZnH-2]5[Se+2]6([ZnH2-2]6)[Zn-2]78[Se+2]78[ZnH-2]([SeH+2]69)[SeH+2]5[ZnH2-2][SeH+2]4[ZnH-2]7[SeH+2]3[ZnH2-2][SeH+2]2[ZnH-2]8[SeH+2]1[ZnH2-2]9; wurtzite structure: [ZnH2-2]1[SeH+2]([ZnH2-2]6)[ZnH2-2][SeH+2]7[ZnH-2]2[Se+2][Zn-2]3([Se+2][ZnH-2]9[Se+2]5)[Se+2]18[Zn-2]45[Se+2][ZnH-2]5[SeH+2]6[Zn-2]78[Se+2]78[ZnH2-2][SeH+2]5[ZnH2-2][Se+2]4([ZnH2-2][SeH+2]9[ZnH2-2]4)[ZnH-2]7[Se+2]34[ZnH2-2][SeH+2]2[ZnH2-2]8

Properties
Chemical formula	ZnSe
Molar mass	144.35 g/mol
Appearance	light yellow solid
Density	5.27 g/cm^{3}
Melting point	1,525 °C (2,777 °F)
Solubility in water	negligible
Band gap	2.82 eV (10 K)
Refractive index (n_{D})	2.67 (550 nm); 2.40 (10.6 μm)

Structure
Crystal structure	Zincblende (cubic)
Lattice constant	a = 566.8 pm
Coordination geometry	Tetrahedral (Zn^{2+}); Tetrahedral (Se^{2−})

Thermochemistry
Std enthalpy of formation (Δ_{f}H^{⦵}_{298})	−177.6 kJ/mol

Hazards
- GHS labelling
Pictograms	(GHS06: Toxic) (GHS08: Health hazard) (GHS09: Environmental hazard)
Signal word	Danger
Hazard statements	H301, H331, H373, H410
Precautionary statements	P260, P264, P270, P271, P273, P301+P310, P304+P340, P311, P314, P321, P330, P391, P403+P233, P405, P501

Related compounds
Other anions	Zinc oxide Zinc sulfide Zinc telluride
Other cations	Cadmium selenide Mercury selenide
- Except where otherwise noted, data are given for materials in their standard state (at 25 °C [77 °F], 100 kPa). verify (what is ?) Infobox references

Zinc selenide is the inorganic compound with the formula ZnSe. It is a lemon-yellow solid although most samples have a duller color due to the effects of oxidation. It is an intrinsic semiconductor with a band gap of about 2.70 eV at 25 °C (77 °F), equivalent to a wavelength of 459 nm. ZnSe occurs as the rare mineral stilleite, named after Hans Stille.

== Synthesis and properties ==
ZnSe is available in both hexagonal (wurtzite) and cubic (zincblende) polymorphs. In both cases, the Zn^{2+} and Se^{2−} sites are tetrahedral. The difference in the structures related to close packing motifs, hexagonal vs cubic.

Cubic ZnSe is produced by treatment of an aqueous solution of zinc sulfate with hydrogen selenide:

ZnSO_{4} + H_{2}Se → ZnSe + H_{2}SO_{4}

Heating the cubic form gives hexagonal ZnSe.

An alternative synthesis involves heating a mixture of zinc oxide, zinc sulfide, and selenium:

2 ZnO + ZnS + 3 Se → 3 ZnSe + SO_{2}

It is a wide-bandgap semiconductor of the II-VI semiconductor group (since zinc and selenium belong to the 12th and 16th groups of the periodic table, respectively). The material can be n-type doped with, for instance, halogen elements. P-type doping is more difficult, but can be achieved by introducing gallium.

Similar to zinc sulfide, ZnSe is produced as microcrystalline sheets by synthesis from hydrogen selenide gas and zinc vapour. Another method of producing is a growth from melt under excessive pressure of inert gas (Ar usually).

It can be deposited as a thin film by chemical vapour deposition techniques including MOVPE and vacuum evaporation.

== Reactions ==
ZnSe is insoluble in water, but dissolves in concentrated hydrochloric acid giving hydrogen selenide gas.

Zinc selenide can slowly react with atmospheric moisture if poorly polished - as it is gradually hydrolyzed by moisture giving the faint rotten garlicky odor of hydrogen selenide at trace amounts. This is not generally a serious problem. Except where optics are used in spectroscopy or at the Brewster angle, antireflection or beamsplitting optical coatings are generally employed.

== Applications ==
Zinc selenide has a few commercial applications for its optical properties. Its wide transmission wavelength range (0.45 μm to 21.5 μm recommends it as an IR material (windows).). The refractive index is about 2.67 at 550 nm (green), and about 2.40 at 10.6 μm (LWIR).

Its luminescence properties have been well investigated.

ZnSe doped with chromium (ZnSe:Cr) is an infrared laser gain medium, emitting at about 2.4 μm.

ZnSe activated with tellurium (ZnSe(Te)) is a scintillator with emission peak at 640 nm, suitable for matching with photodiodes. It is used in x-ray and gamma ray detectors. ZnSe scintillators are significantly different from the ZnS ones.
