= Johannes F. Vaes =

Belgian mineralogist

Johannes Franciscus Vaes (1902–1978) was a Belgian mineralogist and geologist associated with the Union Minière du Haut-Katanga, in Belgian Congo, now the Democratic Republic of the Congo.

Vaes discovered the mineral vaesite, which was named after him in 1945 by Paul F. Kerr.
