= Vaesite =

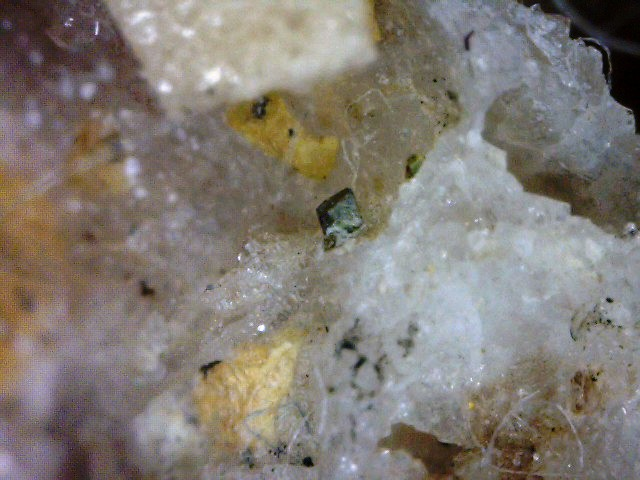
- Vaesite on a matrix

General
- Category: Sulfide minerals
- Formula: NiS_{2}
- IMA symbol: Va
- Crystal system: Isometric

Identification
- Color: Black, silver-gray
- Cleavage: Distinct/good {001}
- Mohs scale hardness: 4.5–5.5
- Luster: Metallic
- Streak: Black
- Diaphaneity: Opaque
- Specific gravity: 4.45

Vaesite (NiS_{2}) is a mineral found together with cattierite in the Democratic Republic of Congo. It is named after Johannes F. Vaes, a Belgian mineralogist. It is part of the pyrite group.
