= Tiemannite =

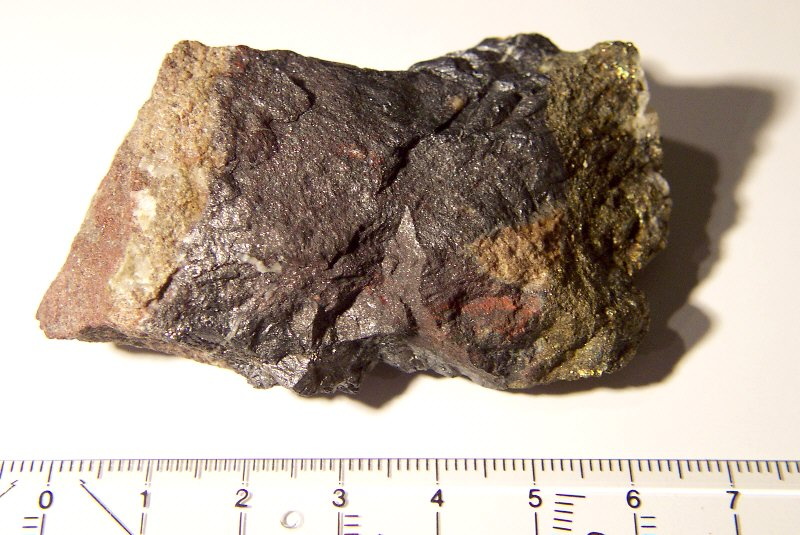

General
- Category: Selenide mineral
- Formula: HgSe
- IMA symbol: Tmn
- Strunz classification: 2.CB.05a
- Dana classification: 02.08.02.04
- Crystal system: Isometric
- Crystal class: Hextetrahedral (4̅3m); H-M symbol: (4̅ 3m)
- Space group: F4̅3m

Identification
- Color: Steel-gray to black
- Crystal habit: Massive and as euhedral crystals
- Cleavage: none
- Mohs scale hardness: 2.5
- Luster: Metallic
- Streak: grayish black
- Diaphaneity: opaque
- Specific gravity: 8.19–8.47

Tiemannite is a mineral, mercury selenide, formula HgSe. It occurs in hydrothermal veins associated with other selenides, or other mercury minerals such as cinnabar, and often with calcite. Discovered in 1855 in Germany, it is named after Johann Carl Wilhelm Tiemann (1848–1899).

== See also ==
- List of minerals
- List of minerals named after people
