= Ferroselite =

Iron selenide mineral

Ferroselite/Dzharkenite
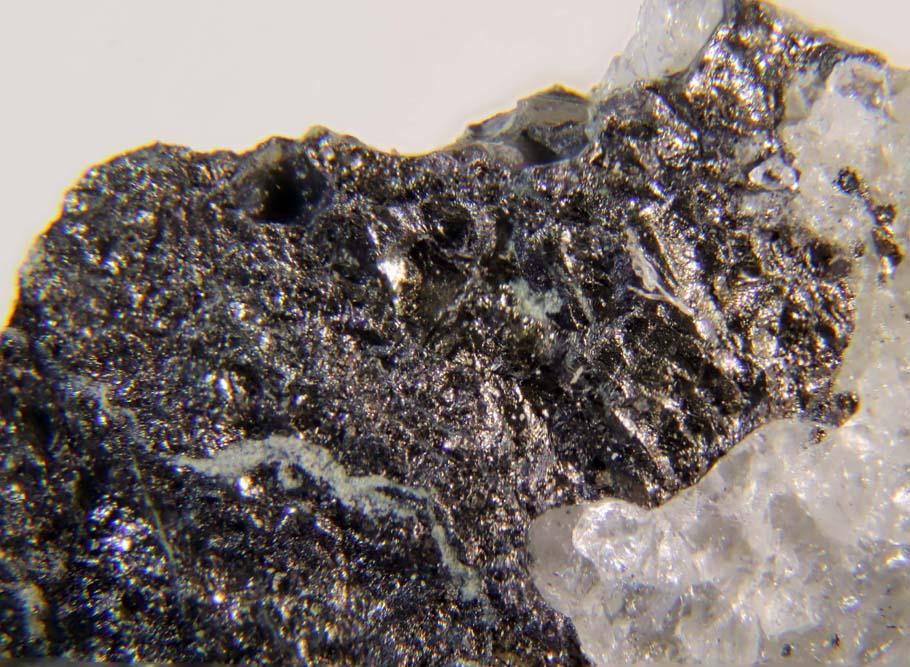
- Ferroselite found in Argentina

General
- Category: Selenide mineral
- Formula: FeSe_{2}
- IMA symbol: Fse
- Strunz classification: 2.EB.10a
- Crystal system: Orthorhombic
- Space group: Pnnm (no. 58)

Identification
- Color: Steel-gray to tin-white with a rose tint, brass yellow
- Crystal habit: Acicular prismatic
- Twinning: Stellate and cruciform twins common
- Mohs scale hardness: 6 – 6.5
- Luster: Metallic
- Streak: Black
- Specific gravity: 7.20
- Refractive index: Opaque
- Pleochroism: Distinct
- Solubility: insoluble in water

Orthorhombic ferroselite and its isometric polymorph dzharkenite are iron selenides of general formula FeSe_{2} precipitated under reducing conditions in anoxic environments. They are a source of selenium in the Rocky Mountains where selenium occurrence is associated with Upper Cretaceous shale deposits.

In the frame of safety assessment calculations made for deep disposal of high-level radioactive waste, ferroselite and dzharkenite are also considered in geochemical calculations as one of the mineral phases limiting the solubility of Selenium-79.

== Names ==
Dzharkenite's type locale is in the Suluchekinskoye Se-U deposit in the Dzharkenskaya Depression of the Middle Ili River, Almaty Province, in southeastern Kazakhstan. It was discovered in 1995 and named after the depression.

Ferroselite was first reported in 1955 for an occurrence in the Ust’-Uyuk uranium deposit in Tuva, Siberia. Its name comes from the Latin ferro (iron) and "sel" for selenium.

== See also ==
- Coccolithophorid, a group of marine planktonic unicellular algae fixing selenium in Upper Cretaceous chalk and shale formations
- Emiliania huxleyi, a major species of coccolithophorid active in selenium bioconcentration
