= Selenide minerals =

Selenide minerals are those minerals that have the selenide anion as a main component.

Selenides are similar to sulfides and often grouped with them.

Examples include:

- achavalite Fe_{1-x}Se
- athabascaite Cu_{5}Se_{4}
- clausthalite PbSe
- ferroselite FeSe_{2}
- penroseite (Ni,Co,Cu)Se_{2}
- stilleite ZnSe
- tiemannite HgSe
- umangite Cu_{3}Se_{2}
