= Clausthalite =

Lead selenide mineral

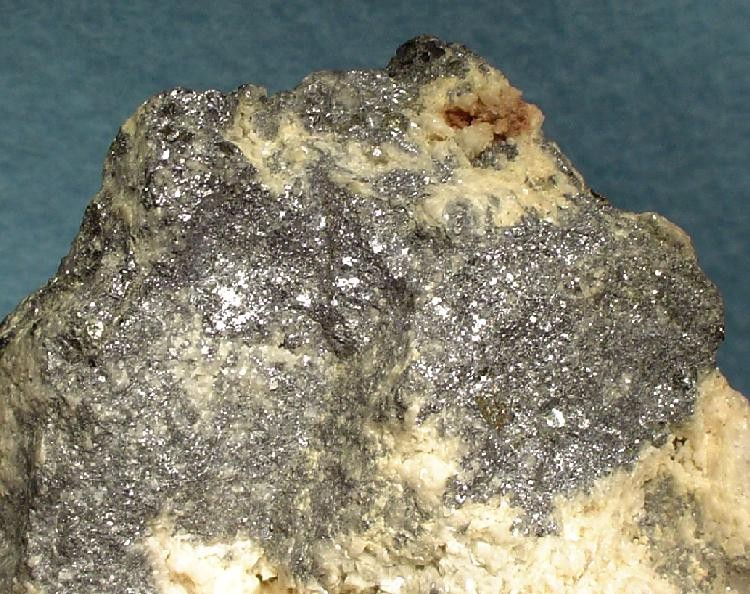

General
- Category: Selenide mineral
- Formula: PbSe
- IMA symbol: Cth
- Strunz classification: 2.CD.10
- Dana classification: 02.08.01.02
- Crystal system: Isometric
- Crystal class: Hexoctahedral (m3̅m); H-M symbol: (4/m 3̅ 2/m)
- Space group: Fm3̅m

Identification
- Color: Bluish gray to lead-gray
- Crystal habit: Massive to granular with euhedral crystals
- Cleavage: {001} Perfect, {010} Perfect, {100} Perfect
- Mohs scale hardness: 2.5
- Luster: Metallic
- Streak: grayish black
- Diaphaneity: opaque
- Specific gravity: 7.6–8.8

Clausthalite is a lead selenide mineral, PbSe. It forms a solid solution series with galena PbS.

== Occurrence ==
It occurs in low-sulfur hydrothermal deposits with other selenides and in mercury deposits. It is associated with tiemannite, klockmannite, berzelianite, umangite, gold, stibiopalladinite and uraninite.

It was first described in 1832 and named for the discovery locality of Clausthal-Zellerfeld in the Harz Mountains, Germany.

== See also ==
- Classification of minerals
- List of minerals
