= Umangite =

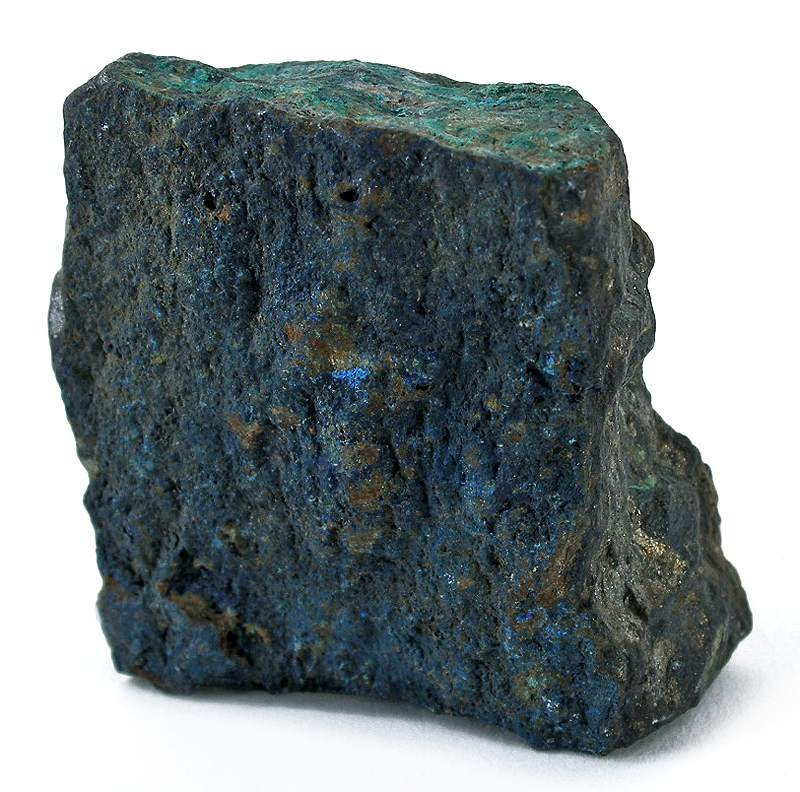
- Umangite (purple) on clausthalite. Other copper selenides (green secondaries) and likely chalcomenite (non-metallic blue)

General
- Category: Selenide mineral
- Formula: Cu_{3}Se_{2}
- IMA symbol: Um
- Strunz classification: 2.BA.15c
- Crystal system: Tetragonal
- Crystal class: Scalenohedral (4̅2m); H-M symbol: (4̅ 2m)
- Space group: P4̅2_{1}m

Identification
- Formula mass: 348.56 g/mol
- Color: Red, bluish red-black
- Crystal habit: Massive granular
- Cleavage: Distinct on [010] and [001]
- Fracture: Uneven
- Mohs scale hardness: 3
- Luster: Metallic
- Streak: Black
- Diaphaneity: Opaque
- Specific gravity: 5.62–6.78

Umangite is a copper selenide mineral, Cu_{3}Se_{2}, discovered in 1891. It occurs only in small grains or fine granular aggregates with other copper minerals of the sulfide group. It has a hardness of 3. It is blue-black to red-violet in color with a black streak. It has a metallic luster.

Umangite is named after the locality of Sierra de Umango, La Rioja province in Argentina. It also occurs at other localities including the Harz Mountains in Germany, and at Skrickerum, Sweden.

== See also ==
- List of minerals
