= Flux Stoke-on-Trent =

- Industry: Pottery
- Founded: 2011
- Headquarters: Stoke-on-Trent, UK
- Products: Bone china
- Website: fluxstokeontrent.com

Flux Stoke-on-Trent is a spin-out company from Staffordshire University. Located in Stoke-on-Trent, traditional centre of the English pottery industry, it produces decorated bone china tableware that is manufactured in the city and primarily designed by students on its ceramics master's degree programme.

== History of the company ==
Flux was established by course director and professor of ceramic design David Sanderson as a university brand with students acting as the design team. Funding came from the Higher Education Innovation Fund, and it officially launched as a spin-out company in October 2011. The company was developed out of the university's MA Ceramic Design course and students get a four per cent royalty on sales of their work.

With help from UK Trade & Investment (UKTI), the company launched internationally at major consumer homeware fairs in Frankfurt and Paris. The china is sold in 20 countries worldwide and in its first year of trading over 95 per cent of sales were to export markets, including China, Russia and Venezuela. In Europe, it is found in outlets such as Galeries Lafayette in Paris and Aria, London.

Since 2020 Barewall Art Gallery based in Burslem, Stoke-on-Trent agreed to be an outlet to sell the remaining FLUX Stoke on Trent ware exclusively on behalf of Staffordshire University.

=== Operation and designs ===
The company adds decoration to plain white bone china made in Stoke, keeping manufacturing costs down by using shapes that are already in manufacture. The company is able to produce single pieces, small batch and volume runs of its designs.

While the pottery references traditional elements of English china, such as use of cobalt blue and gilt edging, designs are updated through use of pattern scale, geometric and architectural elements. Pieces are designed to move away from the formality of the traditional matching dinner set and are interchangeable.

=== Awards ===
Professor David Sanderson won the Ceramics and Glassware Design Award in the 2012 Homes & Gardens Designer awards. In 2013, Flux Stoke-on-Trent won a PraxisUnico Impact Award, following its success at Paris trade fairs and the British Ceramics Biennial.

== See also ==
- Staffordshire Potteries
- Staffordshire University

== External sources ==
- Flux Stoke-on-Trent outlet website
- Flux Stoke-on-Trent website
- Impact Award description
