= Bristol blue glass =

Distinctive type of coloured glass made in Bristol, England

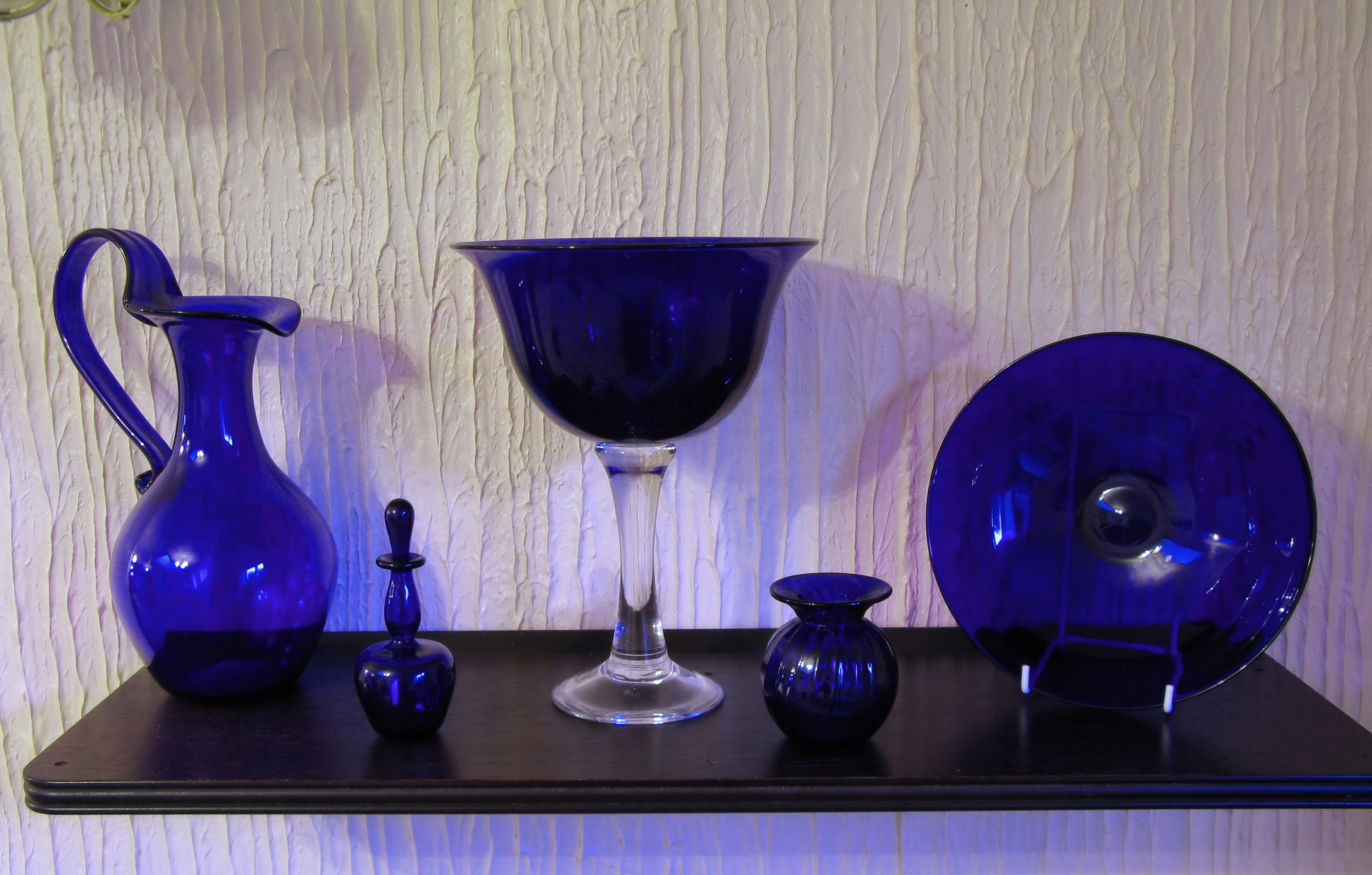
Bristol Blue glassware. The goblet in the centre is 11 inches (28 cm) high.

Bristol blue glass has been made in Bristol, England, since the 18th century, with a break between the 1920s and 1980s.

== History ==
During the late 18th century Richard Champion, a Bristol merchant and potter, making Bristol porcelain, was working with a chemist, William Cookworthy. Cookworthy began a search for good quality cobalt oxide to give the blue glaze decoration on the white porcelain and obtained exclusive import rights to all the cobalt oxide from the Royal Saxon Cobalt Works in Saxony. It is uncertain when Bristol blue glass was first made but the quality and beauty of the glass swiftly gained popularity, with seventeen glass houses being set up in the city.

Lazarus and Isaac Jacobs were the most famous makers of Bristol blue glass in the 1780s. Lazarus Jacobs was a Jewish immigrant to Bristol from Frankfurt am Main, Germany. In 1774, at the age of seventeen, Isaac joined his father's glass cutting firm at 108 Temple Street, Bristol, and launched Bristol Blue glass as a national brand, using the cobalt oxide Cookworthy imported. Isaac was responsible for the great growth of the company, and the expansion of its goods. Their company held a royal warrant and made glass for the aristocrats of Europe. Bristol’s glass makers were invited to demonstrate their skills at the Great Exhibition of 1851, opened by Queen Victoria and Prince Albert. At this period cranberry glass was made for the first time by adding 24 carat gold to lead crystal, giving the glass its ruby red tones.

Production ceased in about 1923.

== Revival ==
Around 1970 Thomas Webb & Sons of Stourbridge made a range of about ten Bristol blue glass shapes, but had to stop as they found cobalt dust was contaminating their lead crystal. At the request of John Stott, the managing director of Thomas Webb (who closed down in 1990), Nazeing Glass of Broxbourne, Herts, supplied the Bristol Museum and Art Gallery Shop with a range of some twenty glass shapes, all based on 18th century inspired designs, from 1975 until 1990. Bristol-based glass makers James Adlington and Peter Sinclair held their Hot Glass exhibition in 1988 at Hand Made Glass, Bristol, which led to a revival of Bristol's hand blown glass industry, and to the creation of a company that has spawned the careers of many other studio glassmakers in the southwest of England. Today, Bristol Blue Glass is produced by The Original Bristol Blue Glass Ltd in Brislington, established in 1988.

In the 1990s, John Harvey & Sons of Bristol began to sell Bristol Cream sherry in bottles made from Bristol blue, after a period of over 100 years during which blue bottles had been associated with the sale of dangerous or poisonous liquids.

During the late C19th some mineral water companies in the North East of England had blue glass bottles manufactured for them. Companies like W.B. Reid & R. Emmerson, Newcastle and E.J. Stewart, Hartlepool used blue glass bottles for the sale of their drinks.

Two main shops operated during the 2000s, one located on High Street, Bristol and the other on Bath Road, Brislington.

Nearing the end of 2024 it was announced that the High Street location would be closing, which occurred in January 2025.

Production from the Brislington store continued until 31 May 2026, by which point the shop had to shut down due to rising costs. Small pieces called "Dinkies" could still be sourced from Exmoor glass.

== Production ==
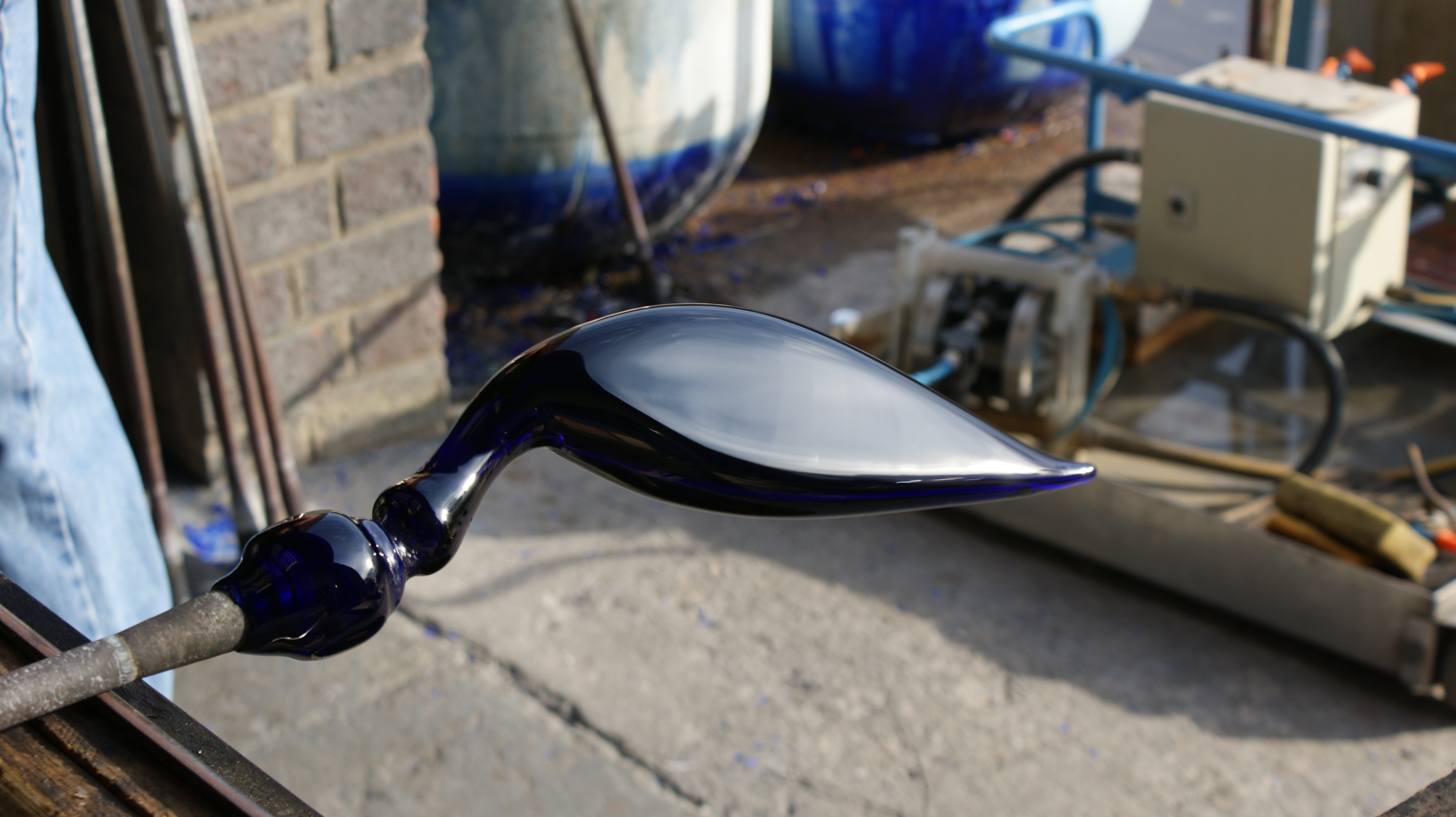
Bristol blue glass heron body

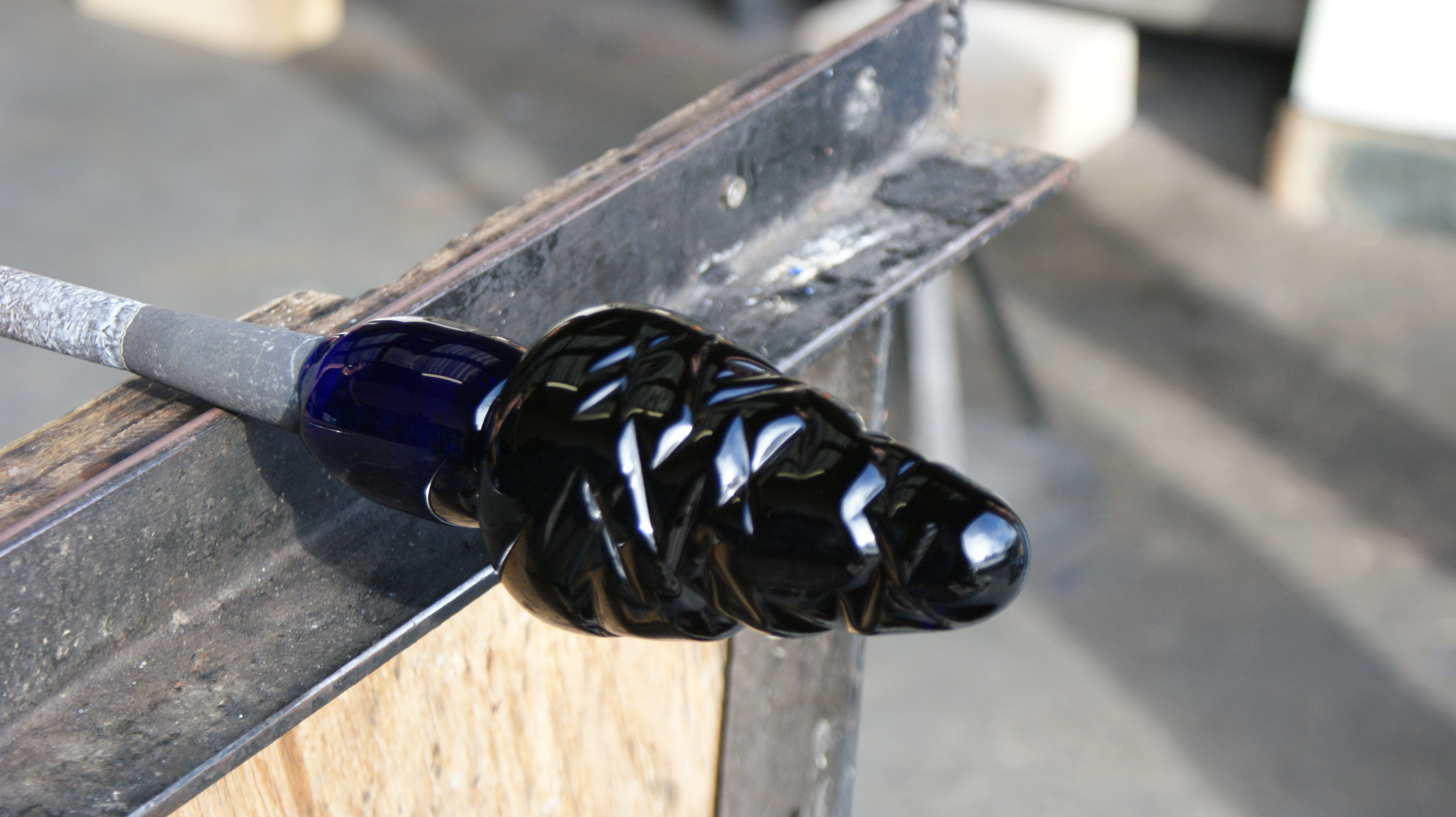
Bristol blue glass heron base

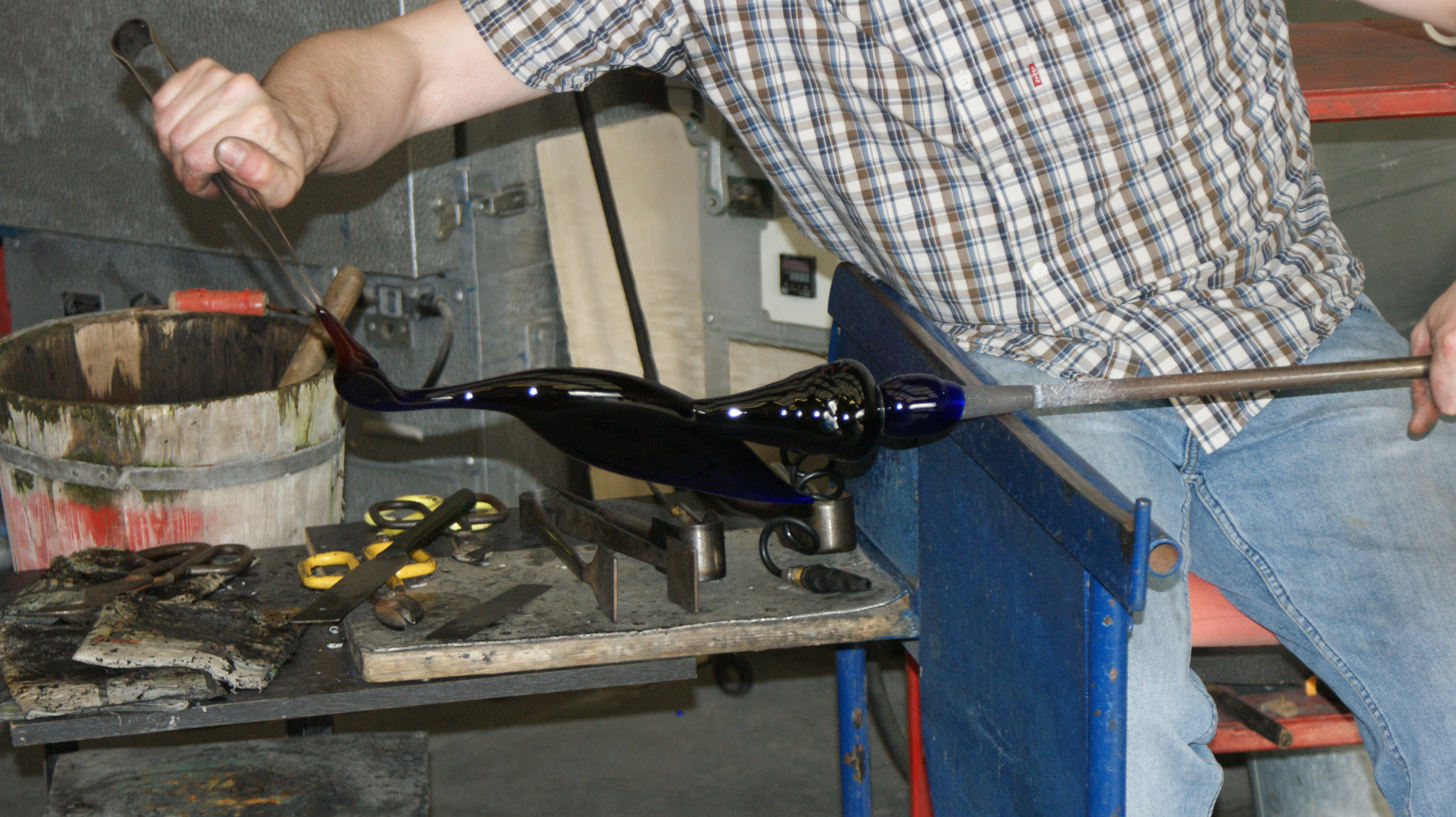
Bristol blue glass heron. Beak being pulled into place

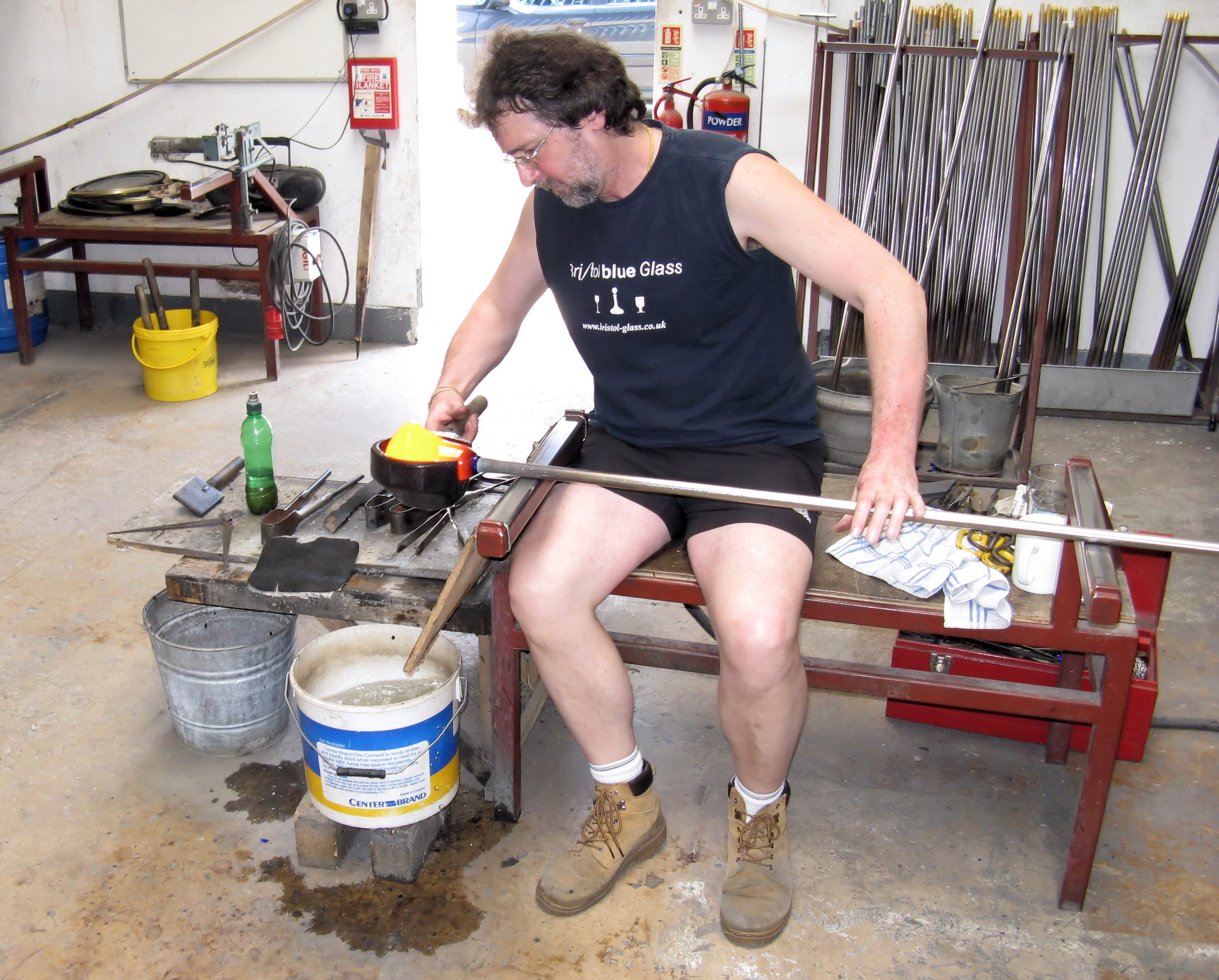
A stage in the manufacture of a Bristol blue ship’s decanter

== Chemical composition ==
The glass contains cobalt oxide, which creates a deep yet bright blue, and 24% lead oxide (PbO).

== See also ==
- Cobalt glass
- Glassblowing
