= Cobalt metagermanate =

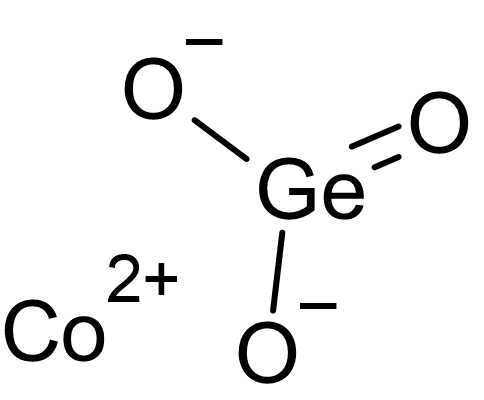

Names
- Other names cobalt(II) metagermanate

Identifiers
CAS Number	12016-77-2
3D model (JSmol)	Interactive image
PubChem CID	23198960
- InChI: InChI=1S/Co.GeO3/c;2-1(3)4/q+2;-2 Key: IYTIOSWUENIHKO-UHFFFAOYSA-N
- SMILES: [Co+2].[O-][Ge](=O)[O-]

Properties
Chemical formula	CoGeO_{3}
Molar mass	179.560 g·mol^{−1}
- Except where otherwise noted, data are given for materials in their standard state (at 25 °C [77 °F], 100 kPa). Infobox references

Cobalt metagermanate is one of the germanates of cobalt, with chemical formula CoGeO_{3}. It is paramagnetic at room temperature and turns antiferromagnetic at or below 32±1 K. It exists in two crystal forms, the orthorhombic and the monoclinic. It can be prepared by the reaction of cobalt(II,III) oxide (or cobalt(II) hydroxide) and germanium dioxide at high temperatures. The chemical vapor phase transfer method can also be used for its preparation.
