= Isaac Jacobs =

English designer (1757–1835)

Isaac Jacobs (1757 – August 1835) was a designer and manufacturer of Bristol blue glass, and is believed to be its inventor.

== Life and career ==
Isaac was one of three children of Lazarus Jacobs, a Jewish immigrant from Frankfort am Main, and Mary Hiscocks, from Templecombe, Somerset. Lazarus moved to Bristol in around 1760, where he began his career as an itinerant glass-cutter. He sold his wares, along with secondhand goods, at Temple Fair in Bristol.

In 1774 he set up a glass manufacturing business at 108 Temple Street. Isaac joined his father's business as a partner at age seventeen. Using cobalt oxide imported by William Cookworthy from Saxony, Isaac designed and branded Bristol blue glass as it is known today.

The Jacobs family were well-placed to develop Bristol blue glass: German glass engraving was highly prized, and continental Jews worked traditionally with coloured glass. Many of Isaac's glasses, signed by him, can be found in the Victoria and Albert Museum and elsewhere.

=== The Jacobs and Bristol Jewry ===
In 1786, Lazarus helped fund a new synagogue, where he was honoured by the Jewish community. At the time, the Jewish community was gradually being accepted into Gentile Bristol society. By the early nineteenth century, Jews were moving from 'the Jew quarter' at Temple, to St James's and Brunswick Square. When Lazarus died in 1796, Isaac took over the business, and was able to move his family to 16 Somerset Square Redcliffe, near the glass factory. As the success of Bristol Blue Glass grew, Isaac became a prominent member of the Jewish community, while also adopting elements of gentility, reflecting his increasing integration into both worlds. Between 1809 and 1814, he was made a freeman of the city of Bristol, moved to a large house he had commissioned in Weston-super-Mare, was granted a coat of arms, and became a member of the Bristol Commercial Rooms. He was making between £15,000 and £20,000 a year.

=== The fall of Isaac Jacobs ===
When the demand for glass dropped, Isaac borrowed money to try and prop up his business. When a loan he made to a friend of £2,000 was not repaid, Isaac could not repay his own debts. In 1820, he was declared bankrupt, and accused of fraud. The charges were dropped, but too late: he sank to being a peddler, returning to the trade of his father. He died in 1835, and was buried in the cemetery he had bought for the Jewish community at St Phillip's twenty years earlier.

== Bristol Blue Glass design and promotion ==
A letter in the Bristol Record Office gives a glimpse into the factory.

On 10 June 1808, Harriet Keyser, Isaac Jacob's daughter, wrote to David Samuels, manager at her father's glass factory. Harriet is planning a party, and asks David to send her a set of glassware. What was a party plan two hundred years ago is now an important historical document. The letter tells what glass Jacobs' company was manufacturing. The list includes blue and clear glass, as well as 'gilt-edged' glass. Harriet asks for a decanter, a jug, champagne glasses and 'finger cups', as well as glassware for lemonade and jelly. This might be the 'Dessert set' that Isaac's advertising campaign describes as 'burnished gold upon royal purple coloured glass', which they 'had the honour of sending to their Majesties'. Isaac's purple glass is on display at the Victoria and Albert Museum.

== Isaac's family and the future success of the Jacobs ==
Another letter in the Bristol Record Office gives a glimpse into the Jacobs family.

On 9 September 1833, Isaac wrote to his granddaughter, Augusta Keyser. He thanks her for her letter and wishes of good health, saying, 'I can fancy you are grown a fine woman.' He says he hopes to see her 'in good health, and sooner than you expect'. He would die in poverty two years later. Isaac was married to Mary MacCreath of Shrewsbury, a Christian woman. They had four children: Augusta Keyser, Matilda Alexander, Lionel Jacobs, and Joseph Jacobs. In 1817, Matilda married Abraham Alexander, who became Bristol's first Jewish town councillor. Abraham was elected in 1844, a year before Parliament lifted the restriction on Jews holding municipal office. Abraham's brother William was elected alderman in 1850. The Alexander family went on to become the next leading Jewish family in Bristol.
