= Cobalt(II) oxide =

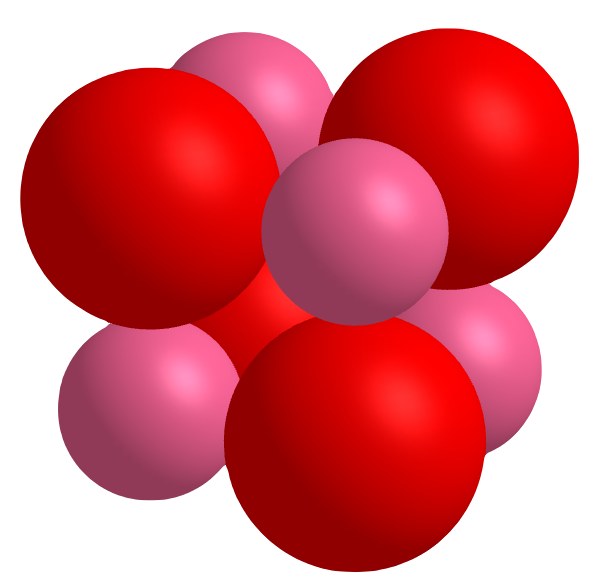
- Cobalt(II) oxide

Names
- IUPAC name Cobalt(II) oxide
- Other names Cobaltous oxide Cobalt monoxide

Identifiers
CAS Number	1307-96-6
3D model (JSmol)	Interactive image; Interactive image
ChemSpider	8117730
ECHA InfoCard	100.013.777
EC Number	215-154-6
PubChem CID	9942118
RTECS number	GG2800000
UNII	V9X9644V7Q
UN number	3288
CompTox Dashboard (EPA)	DTXSID6051649
- InChI: InChI=1S/Co.O/q+2;-2 Key: IUYLTEAJCNAMJK-UHFFFAOYSA-N; InChI=1/Co.O/rCoO/c1-2 Key: IVMYJDGYRUAWML-NNYFCMOLAO; InChI=1/Co.O/q+2;-2 Key: IUYLTEAJCNAMJK-UHFFFAOYAY
- SMILES: [Co]=O; [Co+2].[O-2]

Properties
Chemical formula	CoO
Molar mass	74.9326 g/mol
Appearance	olive or gray powder
Odor	odorless
Density	6.45 g/cm^{3}
Melting point	1,933 °C (3,511 °F; 2,206 K)
Solubility in water	insoluble in water
Magnetic susceptibility (χ)	+4900.0·10^{−6} cm^{3}/mol

Structure
Crystal structure	cubic, cF8
Space group	Fm3̅m, No. 225

Hazards
- GHS labelling
Pictograms	(GHS07: Exclamation mark) (GHS09: Environmental hazard)
Signal word	Warning
Hazard statements	H302, H317, H410
Precautionary statements	P260, P280, P284, P301+P310+P330, P304+P340+P310, P342+P311, P403+P233
NFPA 704 (fire diamond)	3 0 0
Flash point	Non-flammable
- Lethal dose or concentration (LD, LC)
LD_{50} (median dose)	202 mg/kg
Safety data sheet (SDS)	ICSC 1551

Related compounds
Other anions	Cobalt(II) sulfide Cobalt(II) hydroxide
Other cations	Iron(II) oxide Nickel(II) oxide
Related compounds	Cobalt(II,III) oxide Cobalt(III) oxide
- Except where otherwise noted, data are given for materials in their standard state (at 25 °C [77 °F], 100 kPa). verify (what is ?) Infobox references

Cobalt(II) oxide is an inorganic compound that has been described as an olive-green or gray solid. It is used extensively in the ceramics industry as an additive to create blue-colored glazes and enamels, as well as in the chemical industry for producing cobalt(II) salts. A related material is cobalt(II,III) oxide, a black solid with the formula Co_{3}O_{4}.

== Structure and properties ==
CoO crystals adopt the periclase (rock salt) structure with a lattice constant of 4.2615 Å.

It is antiferromagnetic below 289 K (16 °C; 61 °F).

CoO has a band gap of 2.5 eV.

== Preparation ==
Cobalt(II) oxide is prepared by oxidation of cobalt powder with air or by thermal decomposition of cobalt(II) nitrate or the carbonate.

Cobalt(II,III) oxide decomposes to cobalt(II) oxide at 950 °C:

2 Co_{3}O_{4} → 6 CoO + O_{2}

It may also be prepared by precipitating the hydroxide, followed by thermal dehydration:

CoX_{2} + 2 KOH → Co(OH)_{2} + 2 KX
Co(OH)_{2} → CoO + H_{2}O

== Reactions ==
As can be expected, cobalt(II) oxide reacts with mineral acids to form the corresponding cobalt salts:

CoO + 2 HX → CoX_{2} + H_{2}O

== Applications ==
Cobalt(II) oxide has for centuries been used as a coloring agent on kiln fired pottery. The additive provides a deep shade of blue named cobalt blue. It also is used in cobalt blue glass.

== See also ==
- Cobalt oxide nanoparticles
- Cobalt
- Cobalt(II,III) oxide
