= Cobalt(III) oxide =

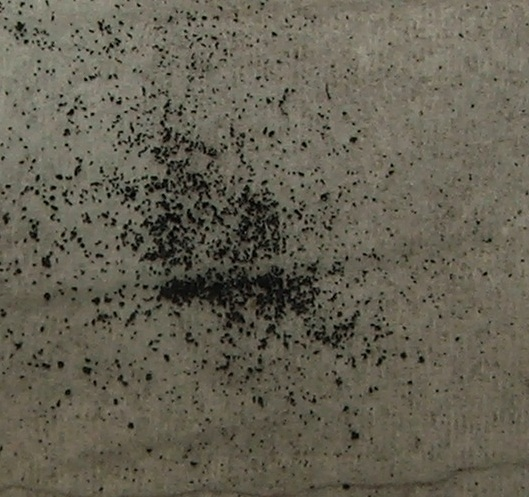

Names
- IUPAC name cobalt(III) oxide, dicobalt trioxide
- Other names cobaltic oxide, cobalt sesquioxide

Identifiers
CAS Number	1308-04-9
3D model (JSmol)	Interactive image
ChemSpider	3324433
ECHA InfoCard	100.013.779
EC Number	215-156-7
PubChem CID	4110762
RTECS number	GG2900000
CompTox Dashboard (EPA)	DTXSID20893870
- InChI: InChI=1S/2Co.3O Key: UPWOEMHINGJHOB-UHFFFAOYSA-N
- SMILES: O=[Co]O[Co]=O

Properties
Chemical formula	Co_{2}O_{3}
Molar mass	165.8646 g/mol
Appearance	black powder
Density	5.18 g/cm^{3}
Melting point	895 °C (1,643 °F; 1,168 K)
Solubility in water	negligible
Magnetic susceptibility (χ)	+4560.0·10^{−6} cm^{3}/mol

Structure
Crystal structure	Corundum, hR30
Space group	R3̅c, No. 167

Thermochemistry
Std enthalpy of formation (Δ_{f}H^{⦵}_{298})	−577 kJ/mol

Hazards
- Occupational safety and health (OHS/OSH)
Main hazards	toxic
- GHS labelling
Pictograms	(GHS07: Exclamation mark) (GHS08: Health hazard)
Signal word	Warning
Hazard statements	H302, H317, H351, H410
Precautionary statements	P280
NFPA 704 (fire diamond)	3 0 0 OX
- Except where otherwise noted, data are given for materials in their standard state (at 25 °C [77 °F], 100 kPa). verify (what is ?) Infobox references

Cobalt(III) oxide is the inorganic compound with the formula of Co_{2}O_{3}. Although only two oxides of cobalt are well characterized, CoO and Co_{3}O_{4}, procedures claiming to give Co_{2}O_{3} have been described. The treatment of Co(II) salts such as cobalt(II) sulfate with an aqueous solution of sodium hypochlorite (also known as bleach) gives a black solid:

2CoSO_{4} + 4NaOH + NaOCl → Co_{2}O_{3} + 2Na_{2}SO_{4} + NaCl

Some formulations of the catalyst hopcalite contain "Co_{2}O_{3}".

Some studies have been unable to synthesize the compound, and report that it is theoretically unstable.

It is soluble in cold diluted sulfuric acid and produces Co_{2}[SO_{4}]_{3}, which is blue in aqueous solution.

Co_{2}O_{3} + 3H_{2}SO_{4} → Co_{2}(SO_{4})_{3} + 3H_{2}O

Cobalt(III) ion is a strong oxidizer in acidic solution, its standard electrode potential is +1.84V in this situation.

== See also ==
- Cobalt oxide nanoparticles
