= Cobalt oxide =

Cobalt oxide is a family of chemical compounds consisting of cobalt and oxygen atoms.

Compounds in the cobalt oxide family include:

- Cobalt(II) oxide (cobaltous oxide), CoO
- Cobalt(II,III) oxide, Co_{3}O_{4}
- Cobalt(III) oxide, Co_{2}O_{3}

== See also ==
- Cobalt oxide nanoparticle
