= Cobalt glass =

Deep blue glass coloured with cobalt

Smalt

Color coordinates
- Hex triplet: #003399
- sRGB^{B} (r, g, b): (0, 51, 153)
- HSV (h, s, v): (220°, 100%, 60%)
- CIELCh_{uv} (L, C, h): (26, 74, 261°)
- Source: ColorHexa
- B: Normalized to [0–255] (byte)

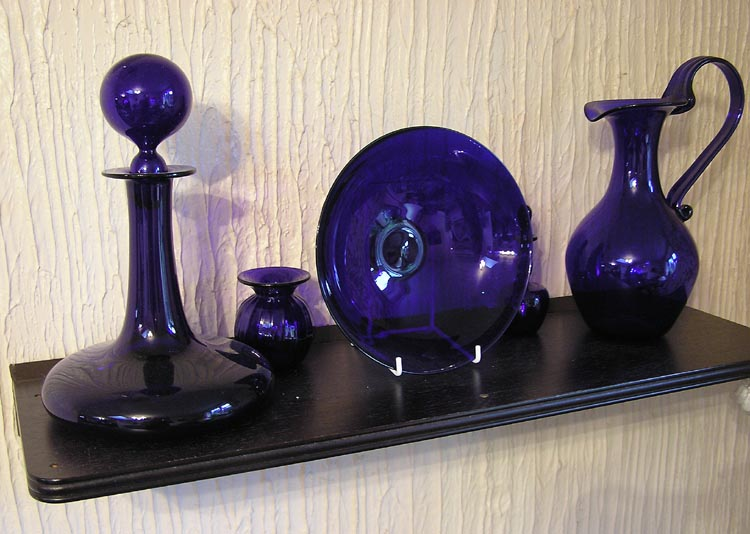
Cobalt glass for decoration

Cobalt glass, also known as smalt when ground as a pigment, is a deep blue coloured glass prepared by including a cobalt compound, typically cobalt oxide or cobalt carbonate, in a glass melt. Cobalt is a very intense colouring agent and very little is required to show a noticeable amount of colour.

Cobalt glass plates are used as an optical filter in flame tests to filter out the undesired strong yellow light emitted by traces of sodium, and expand the ability to see violet and blue hues, similar to didymium glass. However, didymium glasses are superior for this purpose as it absorbs less light other than the Sodium D lines. Specialty tasting glasses made of cobalt glass are used by professional olive oil tasters to disguise the colour of the oil being assessed to avoid bias in judging.

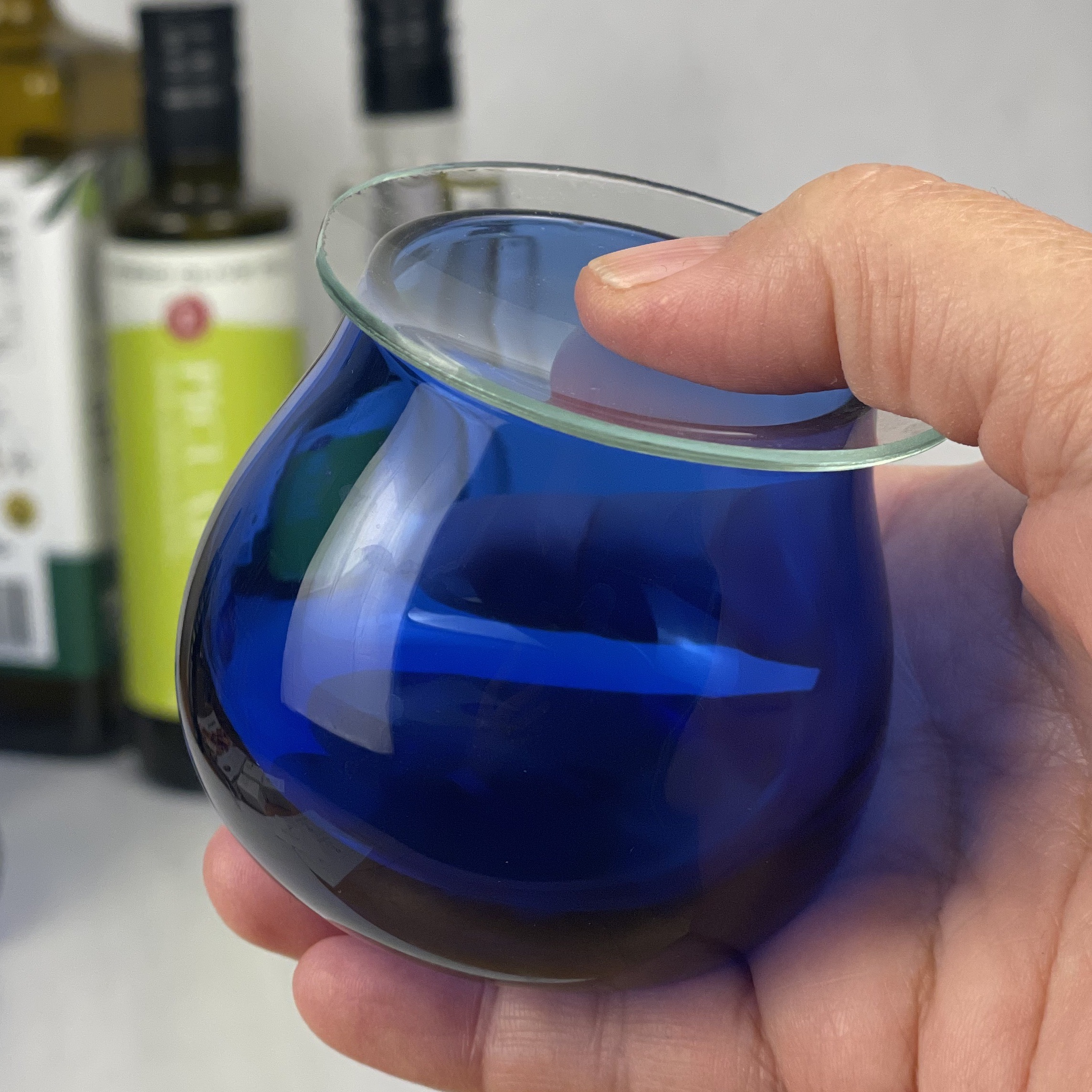
Regulation cobalt blue olive oil tasting glass with a watch glass cover

Moderately ground cobalt glass (potassium cobalt silicate)—called "smalt"—has been historically important as a pigment in glassmaking, painting, pottery, for surface decoration of other types of glass and ceramics, and other media. The long history of its manufacture and use has been described comprehensively. Cobalt aluminate, also known as "cobalt blue", can be used in a similar way.

Cobalt glass such as Bristol blue glass is appreciated for its attractive colour and is popular with collectors. It is used in the distinctive blue bottles of Harvey's Bristol Cream sherry and Tŷ Nant mineral water.

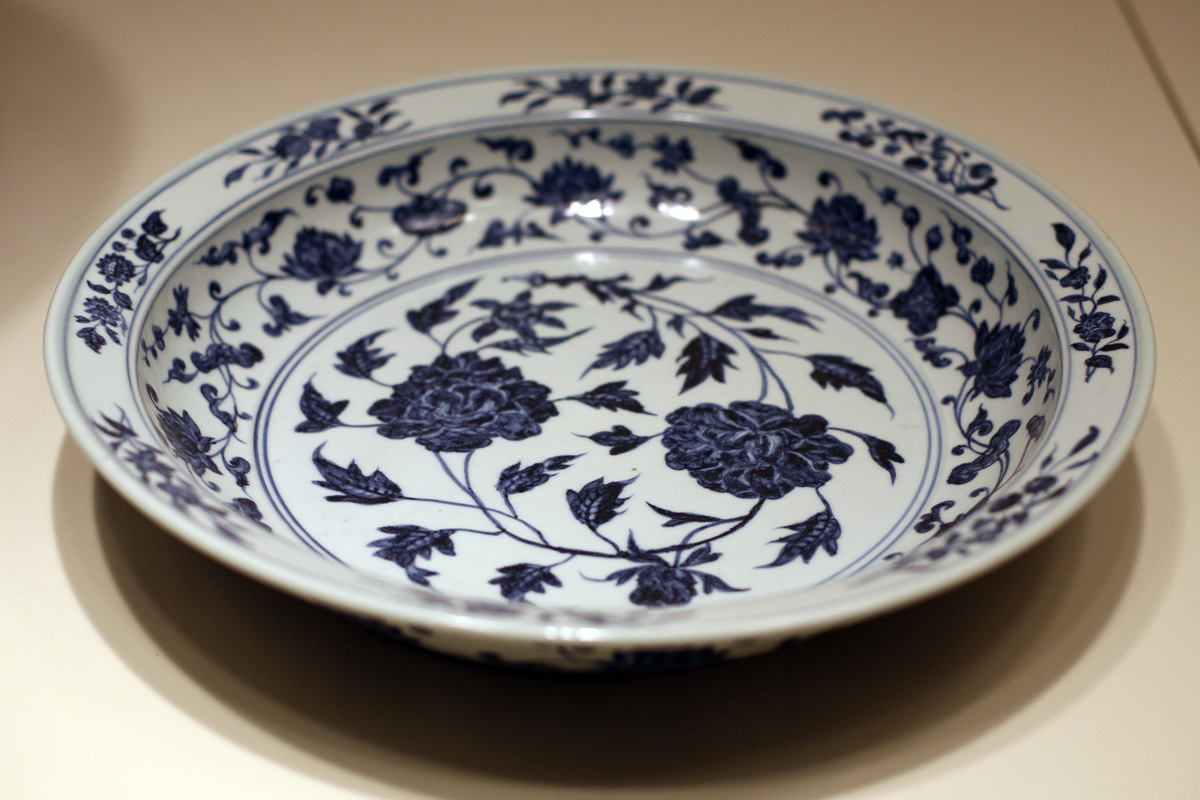
Ming dish, with smalt blue decoration

== History ==
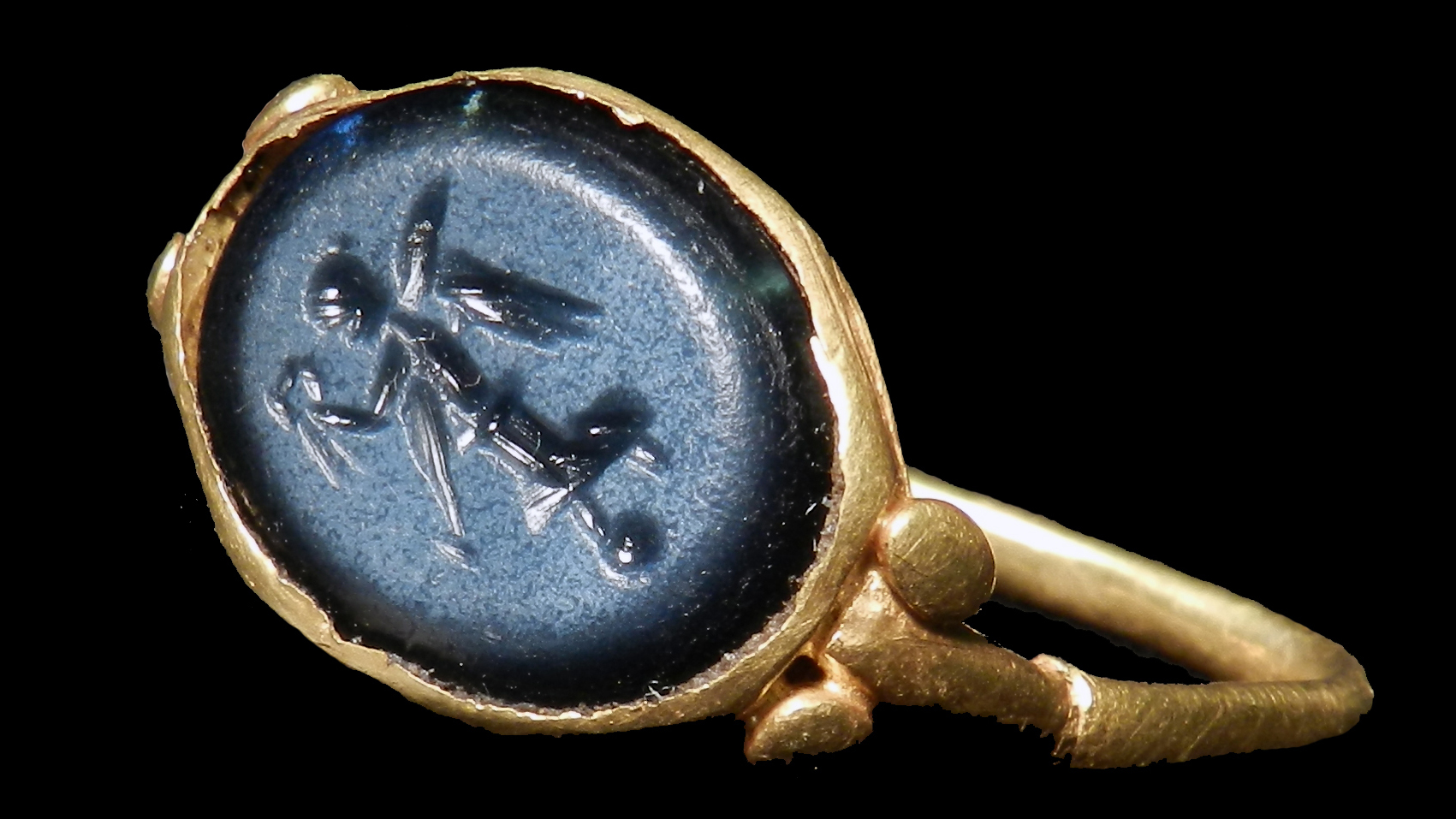
Late Roman (circa 4th century AD) finger ring with blue glass intaglio of the figure of Victory

The earliest known example of cobalt aluminate glass dates to a lump from about 2000 BC in ancient Mesopotamia, very possibly intended for use as a pigment; it was rare until the modern era. Cobalt oxide smalt appears as a pigment in Egyptian pottery about five centuries later, and soon after in the Aegean region. In paintings, smalt has a tendency to lose its colour over a long period, and is little used today. However, when used in ceramics for underglaze decoration, it keeps its colour well, and is the main blue used in blue and white pottery from a wide range of dates and areas, including Chinese blue and white porcelain from the Yuan and Ming dynasties, Renaissance Italian maiolica and Delftware.

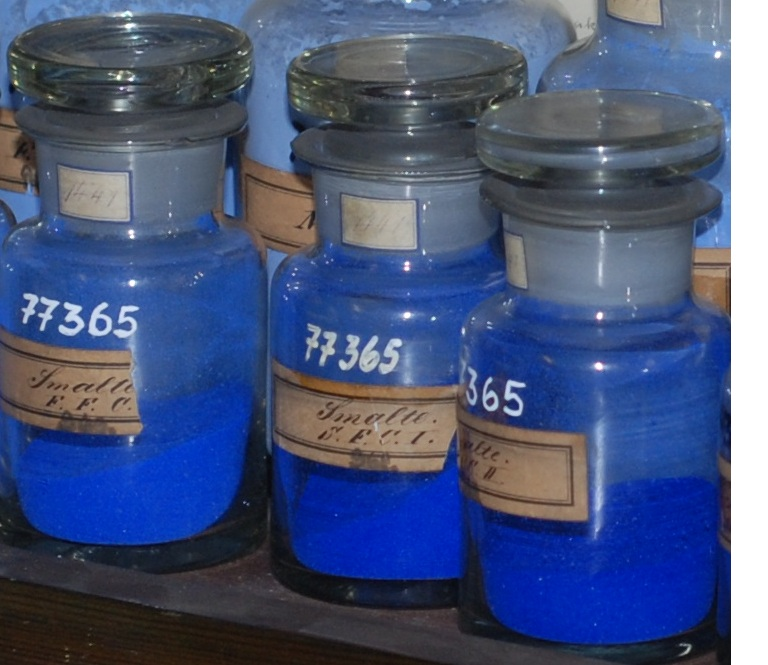
Samples of smalt in the Historical dye collection of the Technical University of Dresden, Germany

Chinese porcelain used smalt glazes from the Tang dynasty onwards, though Chinese cobalt glass is found from the Zhou dynasty (1122–221 BC). Cobalt was used as a pigment in Central Asia from the 13th century. A fragment of a mud painting in the ancient Tangut city of Khara-Khoto has been found to contain smalt, judged to be dated between the 11th and 13th centuries. A large quantity of smalt was purchased for the decoration of the gallery of Francis I of France at Fontainebleau in 1536. Smalt, normally now discoloured, is common in European paintings from the 15th to 17th centuries. For example, it is found in Hans Holbein the Younger's portrait of Sir William Butts (ca. 1540), in Michael Pacher's painting "The Early Fathers' Altar" (ca. 1483), and in the frescos of Domenico Ghirlandaio (1449–1494).

The invention of a European smalt process has traditionally been credited to a Bohemian glassmaker named Christoph Schürer, around 1540–1560. However, its presence in Dieric Bouts' The Entombment from circa 1455 proves that it was used at least a century earlier.

In England and Scotland, smalt was added to laundry starch. James VI and I considered awarding a patent for making a "blue azure" product for this purpose in Scotland in February 1609.

The process used for producing cobalt smalt glass at the Blaafarveværket industrial manufacturing center in Norway in the 19th century has been documented as smelting cobalt oxide together with quartz and potassium carbonate. The result was an intensely blue glass-like substance that was ground and sold to producers of glassware and porcelain.
