= Bolesławiec pottery =

Pottery produced in Bolesławiec, Poland

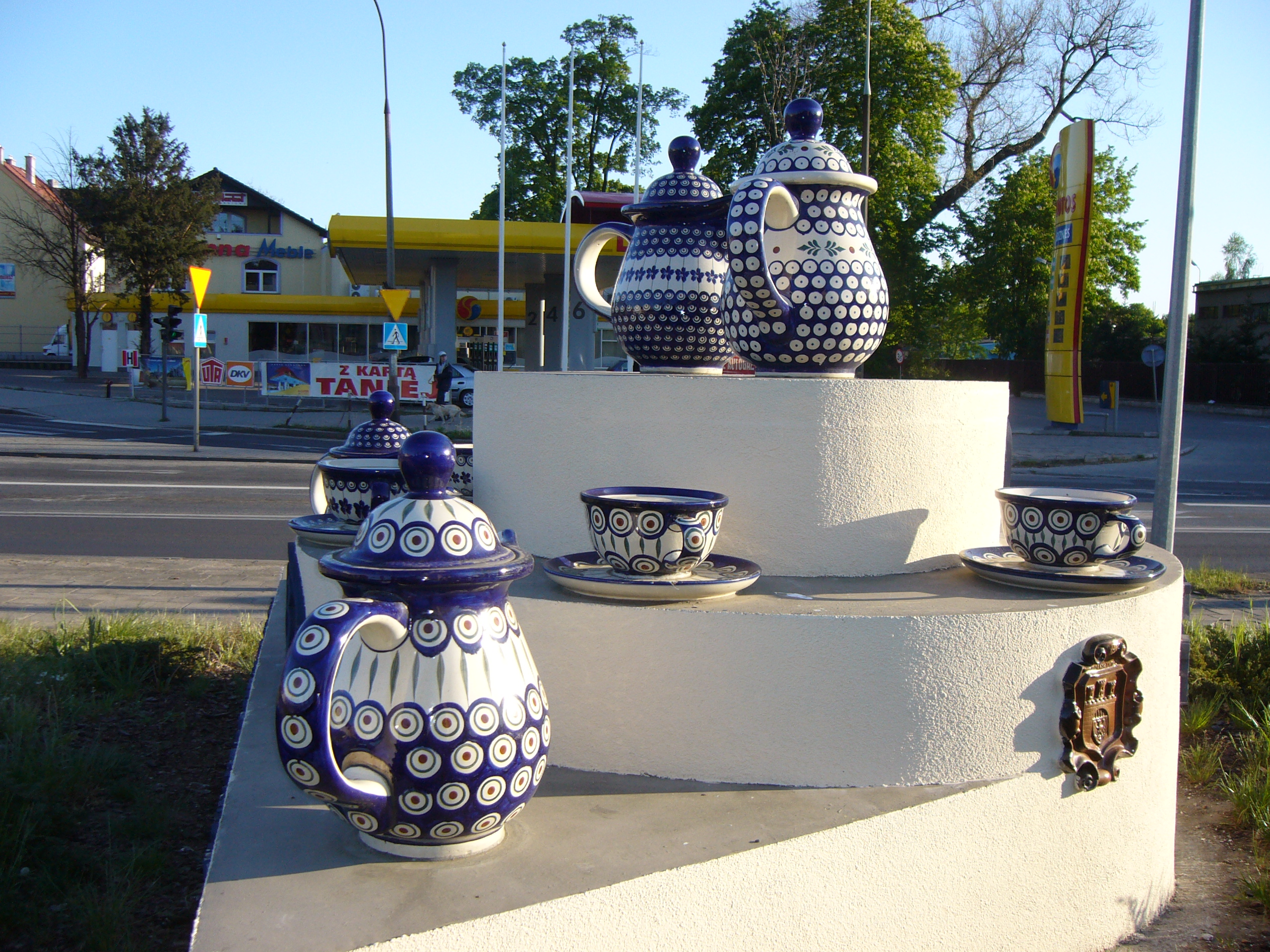
A display that illustrates style of Bolesławiec pottery.

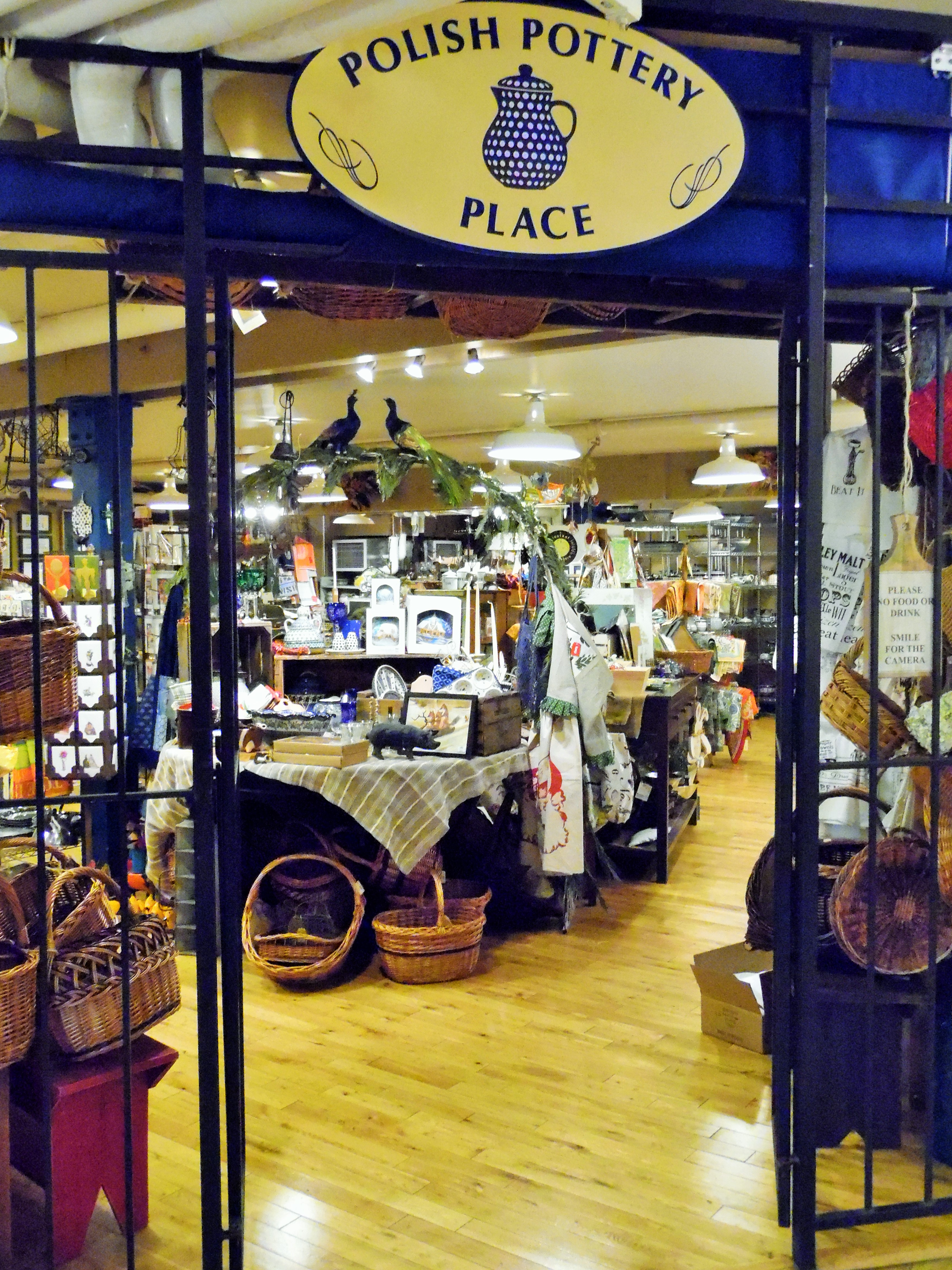
Polish store in Seattle

Bolesławiec pottery (English: BOLE-swavietz, Polish: [bɔlɛ'swav^{j}ɛt͡s]), also referred to as Polish pottery, is the collective term for fine pottery and stoneware produced in the town of Bolesławiec, in south-western Poland. The ceramics are characterized by a cobalt blue polka dot pattern on a white background or vice versa.

The art originated in the late Middle Ages, but it fully developed in the 19th century and has continued ever since. The scope of the stoneware ranges from teapots and jugs to plates, platters and candelabra. The pottery is collectively known as "Polish stoneware", as it became one of Poland's unofficial cultural symbols.

== Overview ==
For centuries one of the premier art forms in Central Europe has been the pottery and ceramics created in the Silesia region. The durable and functional creamy white and blue stoneware pieces are unique and easily identifiable. Ceramics and pottery are a definitive part of the identity of the city of Bolesławiec (Bunzlau). The town itself is often called Miasto Ceramiki (Town of Ceramics). The town is known for the ceramics and it is one of its defining features. The ceramics there have been produced for over a thousand years.

The ceramics works are referred to as Bolesławiec pottery, or they are sometimes called by their German name: Bunzlau pottery or Bunzlauer pottery. There has recently been a resurgence in the popularity of Bolesławiec ceramic art in the United States.

The geography lends itself to ceramic work as the area is rich in natural clay deposits; the clay is still excavated today. The clay is plentiful and of extremely high quality. It has a high feldspar and silicon content, and is classified as stoneware after firing. It is fired at extremely high temperatures, around 1100-1300 degrees Celsius. The clay is brown to grey in color, and rough in texture compared to finer claybodies such as porcelain. Stoneware is sturdy and vitreous to semi-vitreous and porous when fired. Glaze can be applied and the piece can be re-fired to create a watertight surface. There is also a unique clay slip associated with the Bolesławiec supply base, the application of which results in a glossy, brown surface.

== History ==
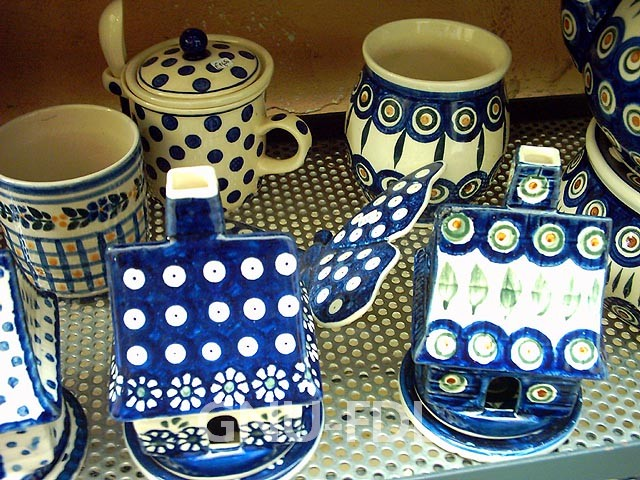
Various types of Bolesławiec stoneware products and ceramics

Ceramics has been a part of Bolesławiec and the entire region's history for an extremely long time. The region around the town is rich in Clay, as a remnant of a Cretaceous sea.

Potters and ceramic artists are on record from as early as the 14th century, with the first written record of a potter in the municipal books of Świdnica in 1380. However, archaeological digs have shown pottery and ceramics from the early Middle Ages, and trading patterns strongly indicate their presence at such an early time.

Potters from the Bolesławiec/Bunzlau area first united into a guild around the start of the 17th century. Most of the earliest remaining pieces date from the beginnings of the eighteenth century. They are characterized by the brown glaze and were usually pitchers or jug type vessels. Some of the vessels are lidded forms with attached tin lids, though many are open. They are wheel made and uniform in shape, and were either smooth or bore a diagonal ridge pattern. Most bear a mark of some kind, usually an individual's initials and a date.

Starting around the middle half of the 18th century the vessels started to become characterized by a natural flowing motif of “sticks”, or a raised design of flowers and leaves on a stem. The sticks were a light white in color, with the surrounding pot usually brown. This added contrast and aesthetic appeal.

Throughout the late 18th century and early 19th century the stick motif was still popular. Other popular motifs included the Bolesławiec/Bunzlau emblem, the potter's emblem of Adam and Eve, heraldic signs, and nature motifs like florals and birds. Pitchers, mugs, and tankards were the most commonly produced works.

Around the latter half of the 19th century the white clay that had previously been used only for the stick motif started to be used for whole vessels. This was due to the innovation of Johann Gottlieb Altmann, a master potter who was the first to cast dishes instead of throwing them on the wheel. Altmann also used a new type of lead-free glaze (German: Schwämmeltechnik) that enabled stamping and allowed for new motifs and designs. Most of the more recognizable designs today, like the repeating circles, scales, flowers, dots, and clovers, were created at that time.

Once Silesia had come under the control of the Kingdom of Prussia in 1742, the Prussian government took an active interest in promoting the pottery industry and intervened in favor of increased production. It did not take long before there was an influx of potters from Franconia, Saxony, Lusatia, and Bavaria eager to work the fine Bunzlauer clays. The old restrictive guild system was ignored as new potteries came into existence. Finally, in 1762, the guild system was abolished.

Among the German potters who moved to the town was the master potter Johann Gottlieb Joppe, who arrived in Bunzlau in 1751. Two years later, he presented the town with the "Great Pot". Standing some 2.5 meters (8.2 ft) tall, this double-handled storage jar was placed in the town square as a symbol of the technical prowess of Bunzlauer potters.

At about the same time that the wave of German potters arrived, Coffee became popular among the European elite. Since the Bunzlauer clays tolerated rapid changes in temperature, they were well-suited in the making of coffee pots. These coffee pots were often accompanied sugar bowls, jam jars and milk pitchers to complete the coffee service, all covered in a coffee-colored slip.

Initially, the Bunzlauer coffee pots were elongated and egg-shaped, their small size emphasizing the preciousness of the contents (Adler, 96). Many of these new forms were covered with delicate sprig-molded reliefs whose white glazing set them off against the chocolate-brown surface of the pot. Coats-of-arms, flowers, angels, stags, and neo-classical figure were common decorative additions to these special vessels. Their appearance is reminiscent of the well-known Jasperware contemporaneously being produced in England by Josiah Wedgwood.

After the annexation of the city by the Kingdom of Prussia, under the auspices of the Prussian kings, who encouraged the growth of the Silesian ceramic industry, Bunzlauer ware achieved a widespread recognition and was shipped throughout the states of Germany. Bunzlauer ware's popularity increased even more after 1828, when the potter Johann Gottlieb Altmann produced a feldspar substitute for the dangerous lead glaze that previously had been used on the interior of the vessels. Altmann also turned his attention to the production of a line of Biedermeier inspired porcelain vessels which were cast rather than wheel turned.

So valued had the pottery of the Bunzlauer region become that it was shipped not only throughout the German states but exported into Russia and Austria. The 19th-century heyday for Bunzlauer ceramics came in the 1870s, when close to 20 different family-run pottery shops were in operation in Bunzlau itself, and some 35 in the neighboring town of Naumburg am Queis (Nowogrodziec). A large number of potters were apprenticed during this period and many of them succeeded in opening their own shops. This resulted in a near doubling of the number of pottery-producing firms in Bunzlau by the mid-1890s.

By the end of the 19th century, however, changes in lifestyle, increasing urbanization, and growing competition from new products such as enameled metalware and glass began to constrict sales. Many of the firms were forced to close. Faced with this threat, the remaining Bunzlauer potters, while continuing to meet an agrarian demand for traditional undecorated brown slip vessels, introduced new lines of smaller wares intended for display in the parlors and dining rooms of middle-class consumers. They began to experiment with colored glazes and application (spongeware) techniques, all aimed at catching the eye of an increasingly urban and urbane public. In their survival effort, the local artisans were aided by professors at the government-sponsored Keramische Fachschule (Ceramic Technical Training School), which had been established in Bunzlau in 1898 under the leadership of the Berlin ceramicist Wilhelm Pukall (1860–1936).

The economic collapse of Germany following World War I was hard on the potters of Bunzlau. They responded by banding together in order to minimize total cost and to market their wares more effectively. The Vereinigte Topfwarenfabrikanten Bunzlau (Bunzlau Pottery Manufacturers Association) was formed in 1921 and lasted until 1929. Shortly before World War II, six of the potteries agreed to cooperate under the name Aktion Bunzlauer Braunzeug (Bunzlauer Brown Ware Action Group) assuming a new mission to revive the historical traditions of the region's pottery. Much of the ware produced was based upon the elegant examples of the early 19th century.

During the 1920s, the Bunzlauer potters also began to borrow design elements from the postwar Art Deco style. In Art Deco, the naturalistic curves of Jugendstil gave way to geometric patterns and the streamlined aerodynamics appropriate to the machine age and the concept of mass production. The Art Deco style, as it developed in Germany, was significantly influenced by Cubism and its offshoot Suprematism. The Suprematist style of pure, geometric abstraction had developed in Russia and was introduced into the famous Bauhaus Design School in Dessau in the 1920s. It was probably from the Bauhaus that this modernist aesthetic was transmitted initially to the Ceramic Technical Training in Bunzlau and then into the design repertoire of those decorating Bunzlauer pottery in the years between the two world wars. The geometric patterns of these new designs were well suited to application utilizing the newly invented airbrush canister and stencil patterns. The Bunzlauer potteries, however, continued to use the ever-popular peacock's eye motif on their spongeware production; they simply added new design lines offering an alternative to a new generation of buyer.

After Bolesławiec became again part of Poland following World War II, and the expulsion of Germans in accordance with the Potsdam Agreement, some German specialists had to stay to transfer their knowledge to the Polish newcomers. The production could continue undisturbed.

Ceramic specialist Professor Tadeusz Szafran was dispatched to oversee the reconstruction of the potteries which also received guidance from the Wrocław Academy of Fine Arts. Szafran supervised the reopening of one of the most significant of the old factories, that of Hugo Reinhold and in 1950 the former firm of Julius Paul reopened under the name Center of Folk and Artistic Industry 'Cepelia'. In 1951, Izabela Zdrzalka became the artistic director of Cepelia, holding that position until 1957. During her tenure, the pottery produced ware decorated with traditional spongeware designs but also experimented with more contemporary forms and decorations, but always with the intent of preserving an aesthetic memory of the old Bunzlauer folk-pottery tradition, known now as "bunzloki". By the 1960s production was once again flourishing. In 1964, Bronisław Wolanin joined the Cepelia firm as its artistic director. It was Wolanin who largely was responsible for establishing the designs typifying today's production; this is based upon the continued use of the popular peacock's eye motif. The Cepelia operation moved into greatly enlarged and modernized quarters in 1989 in keeping with increasing demand throughout Europe, the United States and Australia.

== Ceramics school ==
The ceramics tradition was strongly promoted by the state of Prussia. In 1897 a Royal Schools of Pottery was established in Bunzlau. The school's first headmaster was a renowned ceramics master from Berlin, Dr. Wilhelm Pukall. He initiated changes that helped reform technical abilities and new work methods, but also supported innovative new ideas and forms of creative expression. It was a time of great growth for Bolesławiec ceramics. The school accepted mostly sons of local potters, and after their completion went on to start their own workshops.

Three important potters that worked around the turn of the century were Julius Paul, Hugo Reinhold, and Carl Werner. They helped realize the new ideas and vision of the school. These three artists and their studios started using stenciling techniques, matte glazes, vibrant colors, and gilding. It was their new techniques that revolutionized modern Bolesławiec pottery. In 1936 the school established a cooperative of six schools called the “Bunzlauer Braunzeug”. Their work can still be found today marked by brown pots with white decorations and signed on the bottom.

Although most of Lower Silesia's ceramic workshops and studios were destroyed by the Nazi Germans during World War II, and the entire German minority population of the town and surrounding province were removed during the retransfer of the territory from Germany to Poland in 1945, the Polish authorities and people made a huge effort to revive the ancient work of Polish pottery making. The cooperative CPLiA was formed and supported by the state-run Eugeniusz Geppert Academy of Fine Arts in Wrocław. This permitted the cooperative to revive a high standard of artistic achievement and enabled funding and the influence of talented potters in Poland and throughout Europe.

== Bolesławiec pottery today ==
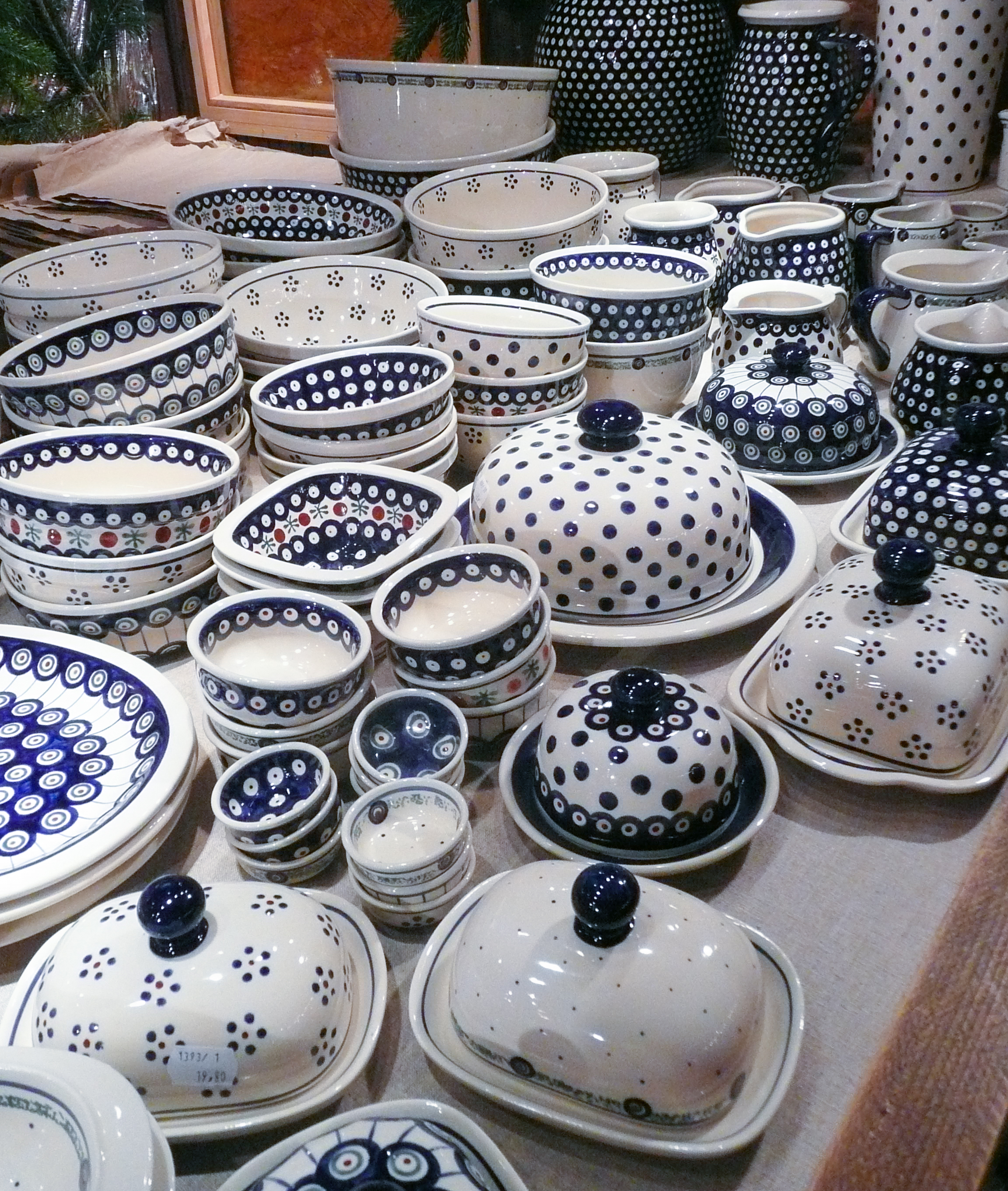
Selection of handcrafted products

All authentic Bolesławiec pottery has the “Hand made in Poland” stamped on the bottom. The Bolesławiec pottery that is most recognizable today is the white or cream colored ceramic with dark blue, green, yellow, brown, and sometimes red or purple motifs. The most common designs include dots, abstract florals, speckles, “windmills”, and the favorite “peacocks eye”. The traditions of 'Bunzlauer' pottery have been preserved in many locations in present-day Germany by expellees from the former town of Bunzlau, and their descendants. Currently, most of the original pottery that comes from Polish Bolesławiec is produced by the CPLiA cooperative and the many artists that work under it, either in factories or smaller studios. Many of the individual artists do their own work, and there is also a large crafts movement that still produces the traditional heavy brown and white stoneware.

Although Bolesławiec pottery has become more popular in the United States in the past few years, it is still largely a regional product and is known primarily in Poland, Germany and Eastern Europe. It is collected by private collectors all across the world, and is also part of many museum collections in Europe, the largest collection being in the Museum of Ceramics in Bolesławiec, in Bolesławiec, Poland. However, with the commercialization of the industry, Polish Pottery ceramics are now sold throughout the world for everyday use in the kitchen as well as collectibles.

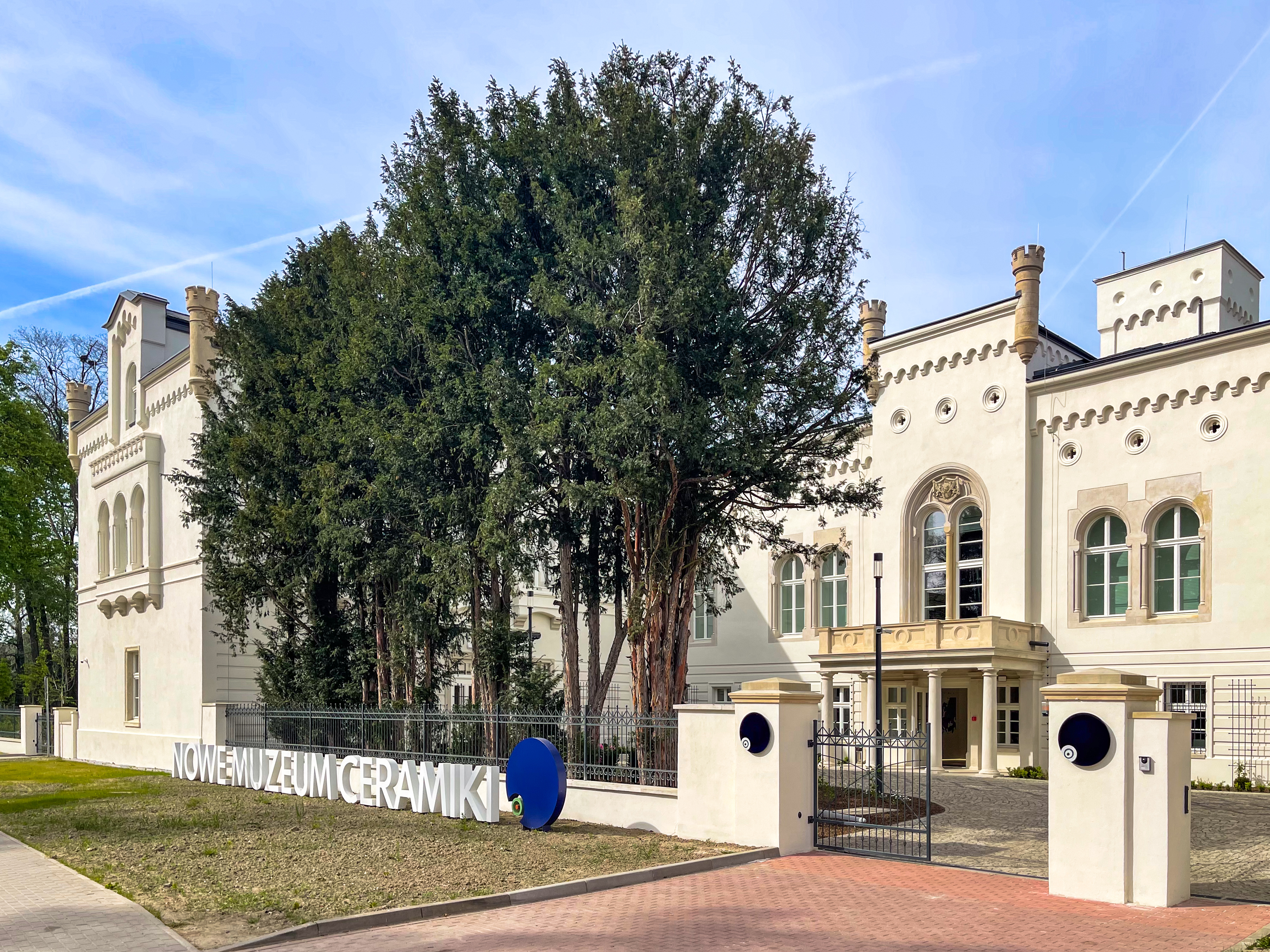
Museum of Ceramics (Muzeum Ceramiki) in Bolesławiec

Bolesławiec pottery was created as a mainly functional product, and still is functional today although the designs have increased in quality and intricacy. It falls in a very different category from fine English and Asian china and pottery that demands high prices in today's marketplace. Still, Bolesławiec pottery is not inexpensive. Mugs and cups usually cost anywhere from twenty to forty U.S. dollars, larger more intricate pieces like bowls, teapots, Memory boxes, and specialty plates can cost anywhere from one to two hundred U.S. dollars, and some hand-painted pieces by recognized artists can cost close to five hundred U.S. dollars or more. Price is dependent on size, type of item, quality of glaze/painting, and whether or not the piece is Unikat, or “unique” in English. When a ceramics artist has been deemed accomplished enough they earn the right to create a piece from start to finish and to be able to sign it. These pieces are stamped with UNIKAT on the bottom and are more rare and of better quality and therefore command a higher price.

Polish Pottery is hand crafted with pride at many small manufacturing companies in Bolesławiec, Poland. All of the pieces are hand painted, using sponge stamp and brushes to paint the art on each piece. All of the patterns are hand-cut by the artists in the sponge and then they use the sponges and brushes to apply the unique pattern to each piece. Sponges are used because they keep the paint wet for a long time, allowing the artist to slowly go around one piece at a time, stamping a unique specific pattern. Several of the artists will create the initial pattern and hand paint a pattern, so all of the artists know what each pattern will be and can keep a similar style to the completed pieces.

In 2017, the Polish presidential couple Andrzej Duda and Agata Kornhauser-Duda presented a Bolesławiec tea set as a gift to William, Prince of Wales and Catherine, Duchess of Cornwall during their royal trip to Poland and Germany.
