= Cobalt(II) hydroxide =

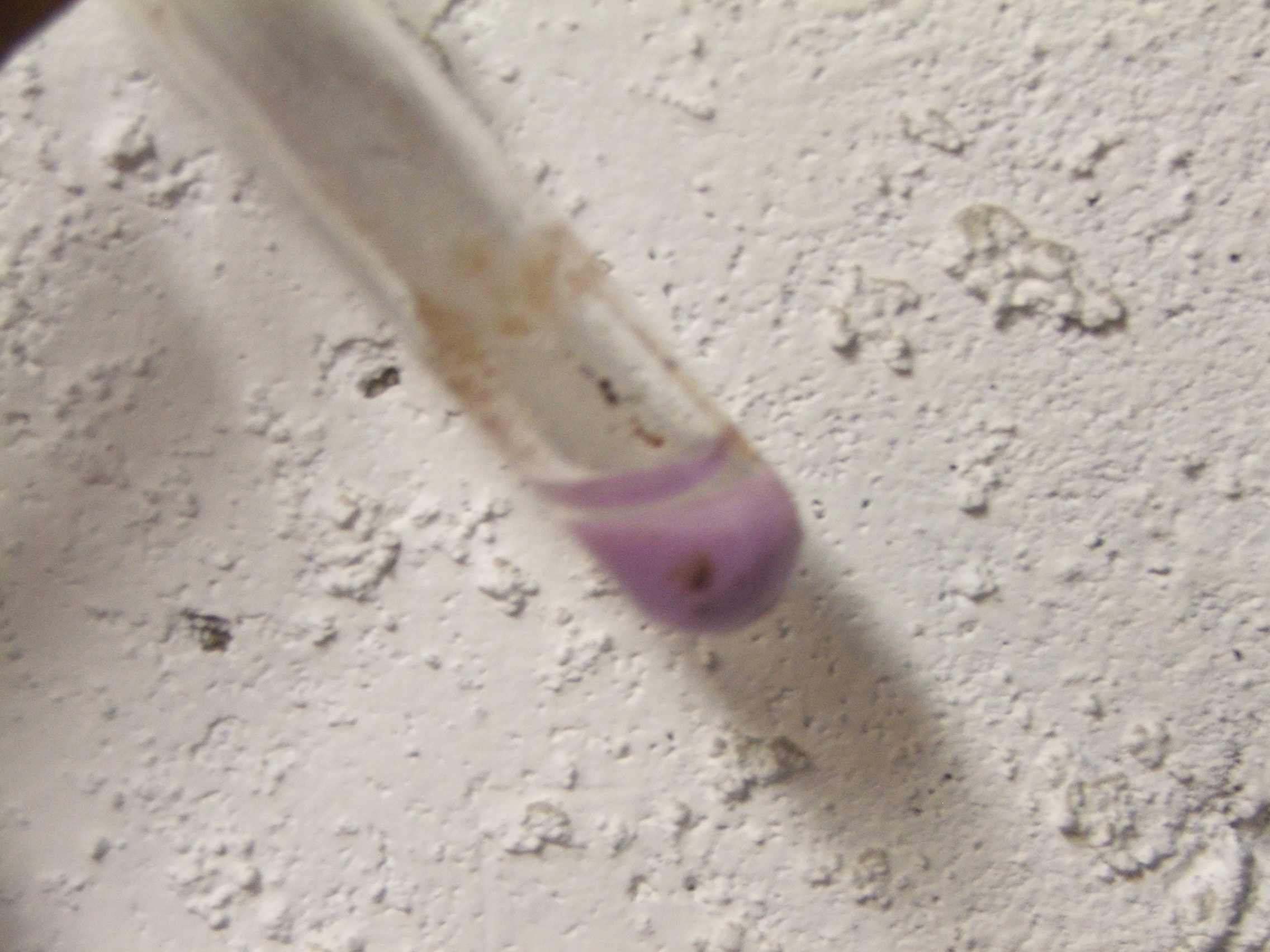
- cobalt(II) hydroxide

Names
- IUPAC name Cobalt(II) hydroxide
- Other names: Cobaltous hydroxide; Cobalt hydroxide; β-cobalt(II) hydroxide

Identifiers
CAS Number	21041-93-0
3D model (JSmol)	Interactive image
ChemSpider	8305419
ECHA InfoCard	100.040.136
EC Number	244-166-4
PubChem CID	10129900
UNII	51B9AYG60K
UN number	3550
CompTox Dashboard (EPA)	DTXSID70894155
- InChI: InChI=1S/Co.2H2O/h;2*1H2/q+2;;/p-2 Key: ASKVAEGIVYSGNY-UHFFFAOYSA-L; InChI=1/Co.2H2O/h;2*1H2/q+2;;/p-2 Key: ASKVAEGIVYSGNY-NUQVWONBAS
- SMILES: [Co+2].[OH-].[OH-]

Properties
Chemical formula	Co(OH)_{2}
Molar mass	92.9468 g/mol
Appearance	rose-red powder or bluish-green powder
Density	3.597 g/cm^{3}
Melting point	168 °C (334 °F; 441 K) (decomposes)
Solubility in water	3.20 mg/L
Solubility product (K_{sp})	1.0×10^{−15}
Solubility	soluble in acids, ammonia; insoluble in dilute alkalis

Structure
Coordination geometry	rhombohedral

Thermochemistry
Std molar entropy (S^{⦵}_{298})	79.0 J·mol^{−1}·K^{−1}
Std enthalpy of formation (Δ_{f}H^{⦵}_{298})	−539.7 kJ·mol^{−1}

Hazards
- GHS labelling
Pictograms	(GHS06: Toxic) (GHS07: Exclamation mark) (GHS08: Health hazard) (GHS09: Environmental hazard)
Signal word	Warning
Hazard statements	H302, H317, H319, H330, H334, H360, H372
Precautionary statements	P201, P202, P260, P264, P270, P271, P272, P280, P281, P284, P285, P301+P312, P302+P352, P304+P340, P304+P341, P305+P351+P338, P308+P313, P310, P314, P320, P321, P330, P333+P313, P337+P313, P342+P311, P363, P403+P233, P405, P501
NFPA 704 (fire diamond)	1 0 2
Safety data sheet (SDS)	Oxford University

Related compounds
Other anions	Cobalt(II) chloride Cobalt(II) bromide Cobalt(II) iodide
Other cations	Iron(II) hydroxide Nickel(II) hydroxide Copper(II) hydroxide
- Except where otherwise noted, data are given for materials in their standard state (at 25 °C [77 °F], 100 kPa). verify (what is ?) Infobox references

Cobalt(II) hydroxide or cobaltous hydroxide is the inorganic compound with the formula Co(OH)_{2}, consisting of divalent cobalt cations Co^{2+} and hydroxide anions OH^{−}. The pure compound, often called the "beta form" (β-Co(OH)_{2}) is a pink solid insoluble in water.

The name is also applied to a related compound, often called "alpha" or "blue" form (α-Co(OH)_{2}), which incorporates other anions in its molecular structure. This compound is blue and rather unstable.

Cobalt(II) hydroxide is most used as a drying agent for paints, varnishes, and inks, in the preparation of other cobalt compounds, as a catalyst and in the manufacture of battery electrodes.

== Preparation ==
Cobalt(II) hydroxide precipitates as a solid when an alkali metal hydroxide is added to an aqueous solution of Co^{2+} salt. For example,

Co^{2+} + 2 NaOH → Co(OH)_{2} + 2 Na^{+}

The compound can be prepared by reacting cobalt(II) nitrate in water with a solution of triethylamine N(C_{2}H_{5})_{3} as both the base and a complexing agent. It can also be prepared by electrolysis of a solution of cobalt nitrate with a platinum cathode.

== Reactions ==
Cobalt(II) hydroxide decomposes to cobalt(II) oxide at 168 °C under vacuum and is oxidized by air. The thermal decomposition product in air above 300 °C is Co_{3}O_{4}.

Like iron(II) hydroxide, cobalt(II) hydroxide is a basic hydroxide, and reacts with acids to form cobalt(II) salts. It also reacts with strong bases to form solutions with dark blue cobaltate(II) anions, [Co(OH)_{4}]^{2−} and [Co(OH)_{6}]^{4−}.

== Structure ==
The (β) form of cobalt(II) hydroxide has the brucite crystal structure, i.e. the arrangement of the atoms in the crystal are the same as the arrangement of the atoms in Mg(OH)_{2}. The Co(II) centers are bonded to six hydroxide ligands. Each hydroxide ligand bridges to three Co(II) sites. The O-H bonds are perpendicular to the planes defined by the oxygen atoms, projecting above and below these layers. Ignoring the H atoms, the packing of the anion and cations is also described as the cadmium iodide structure, in which the cobalt(II) cations have octahedral molecular geometry.

The beta form can be obtained as platelets with partial hexagonal geometry, 100-300 nm wide and 5-10 nm thick.

=== Alpha form ===
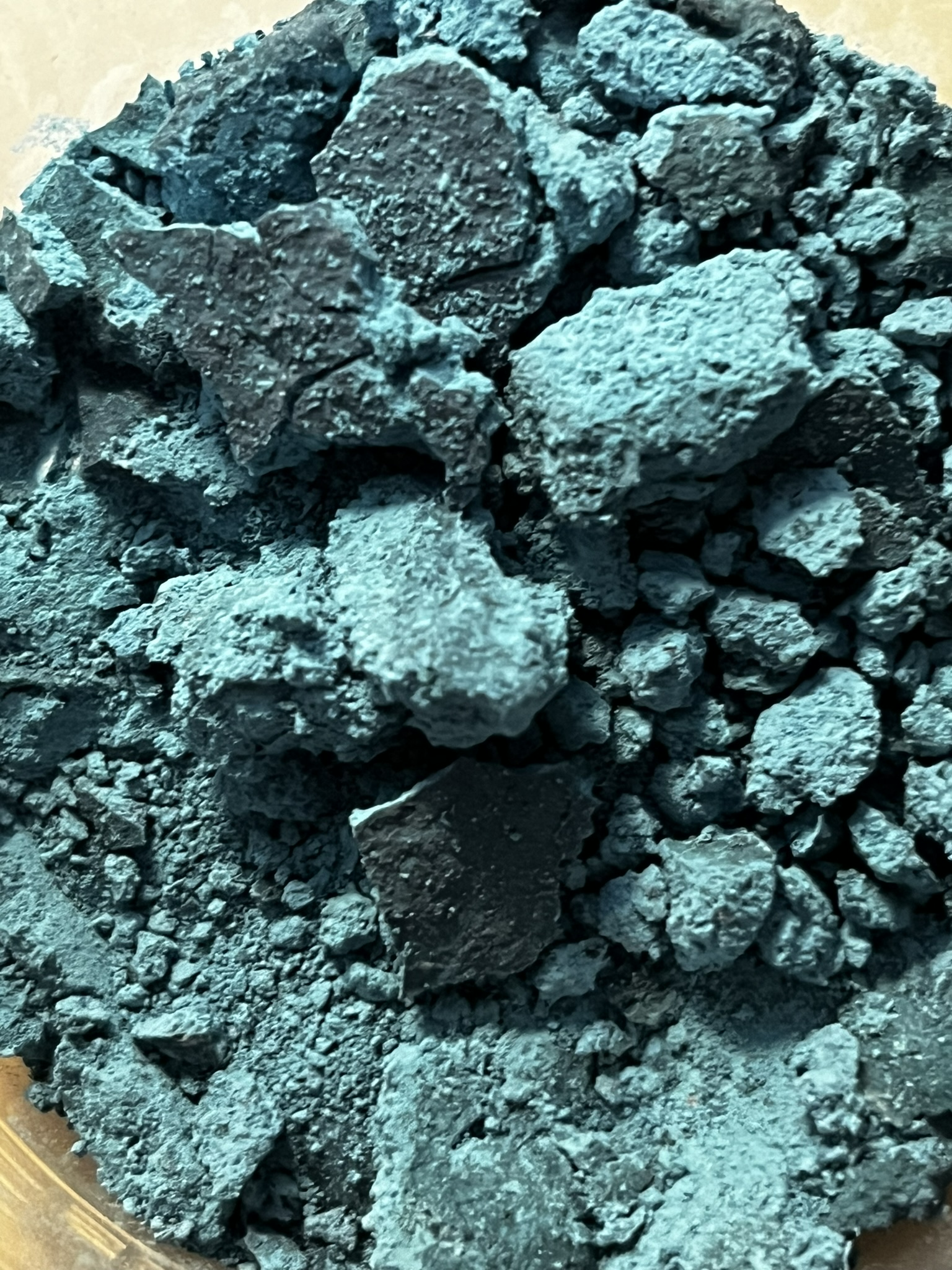
α form of Co(OH)_{2}

The so-called "alpha form" (α-Co(OH)_{2}) is not a polymorph of the pure (β) form, but rather a more complex compound in which hydroxide-cobalt-hydroxide layers have a residual positive charge and alternate with layers of other anions such as nitrate, carbonate, chloride, etc. (the hydrotalcite structure). It is usually obtained as a blue precipitate when a base like sodium hydroxide is added to a solution of a cobalt(II) salt. The precipitate slowly converts to the beta form.

=== Nanotubes ===
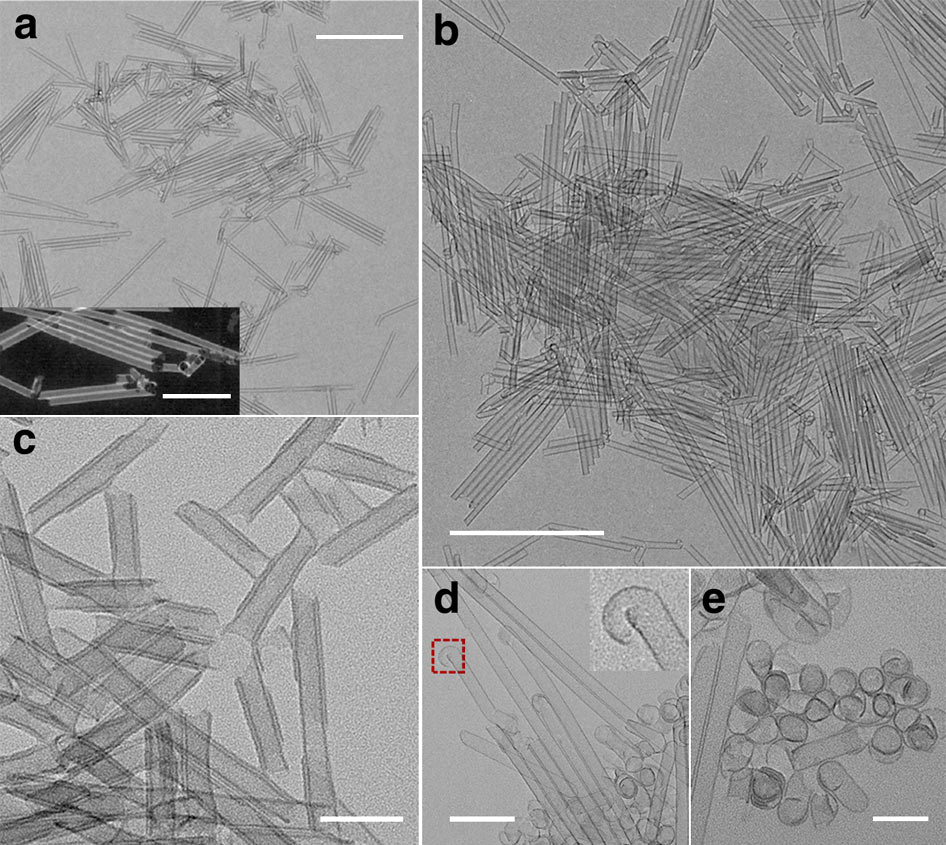
Cobalt hydroxide nanotubes. Scale bars: (a,b) 500 nm, inset 200 nm; (c,e) 50 nm; (d) 100 nm.

Cobalt hydroxide can be obtained in the form of nanotubes, which may be of interest in nanotechnology and materials science.
