= British Ceramics Biennial =

Ceramics exhibition in Stoke-on-Trent, England

- Genre: Ceramics exhibition
- Locations: Stoke-on-Trent, England
- Years active: 2009–present
- Website: www.britishceramicsbiennial.com

The British Ceramics Biennial (BCB) is a ceramics event based in Stoke-on-Trent, England. Founded in 2009, it showcases work by established and emerging ceramic artists.

The event has used several venues, including China Hall in 2019, multiple venues across Stoke-on-Trent in 2021, All Saints Church in Hanley and other venues in Stoke-on-Trent and Newcastle-under-Lyme in 2023, and the Spode pottery site in 2025.
