= Cobalt blue =

Blue pigment

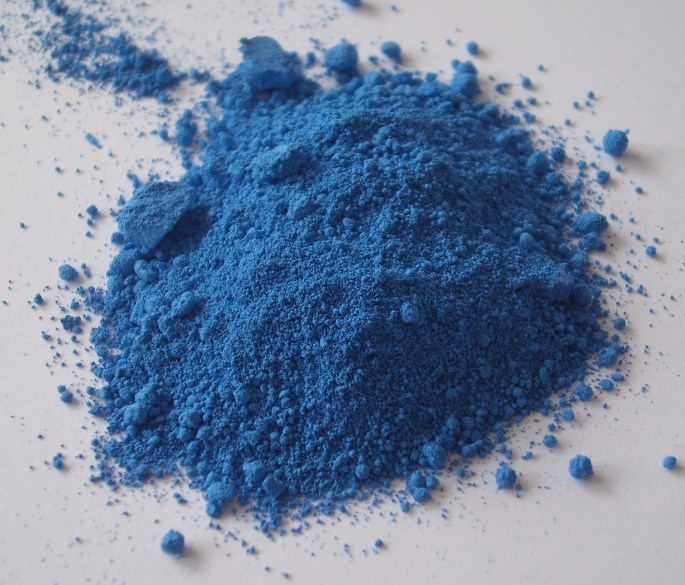
- A sample of a commercial cobalt blue pigment

Color coordinates
- Hex triplet: #0047AB
- sRGB^{B} (r, g, b): (0, 71, 171)
- HSV (h, s, v): (215°, 100%, 67%)
- CIELCh_{uv} (L, C, h): (33, 82, 259°)
- ISCC–NBS descriptor: Vivid blue
- B: Normalized to [0–255] (byte)

Cobalt blue
Identifiers
CAS Number	1345-16-0
3D model (JSmol)	Interactive image
ChemSpider	10653098
ECHA InfoCard	100.100.107
EC Number	310-193-6
PubChem CID	12888320
- InChI: InChI=1S/2Al.Co.4O/q;;+2;;;2*-1 Key: BVTIIQXILLBFIK-UHFFFAOYSA-N
- SMILES: [O-][Al]=O.[O-][Al]=O.[Co+2]

Properties
Chemical formula	Al_{2}CoO_{4}
Molar mass	176.892 g·mol^{−1}
- Except where otherwise noted, data are given for materials in their standard state (at 25 °C [77 °F], 100 kPa). Infobox references

Cobalt blue is a blue pigment consisting principally of cobalt(II) aluminate, CoAl_{2}O_{4}, made by sintering cobalt(II) oxide with aluminium(III) oxide (alumina) at high temperatures. It is used as a ceramic color, in automotive and industrial coatings, in scientific and medical imaging, and as a fine-art pigment. Its thermostability, chemical inertness, and lightfastness make it suitable for applications requiring a durable blue color.

Before the development of cobalt blue, the primary cobalt-based pigment was smalt, a blue pigment made by grinding cobalt-containing glass. Smalt is of relatively weak tinting strength and can exhibit poor lightfastness in some formulations. The development of cobalt blue, together with the rising demand for strongly tinting and highly saturated pigments from the 19th century, contributed to the decline of smalt as a paint pigment. Smalt however, remains popular as a glass colorant.

== Historical uses and production ==
Ores containing cobalt have been used since antiquity as pigments to give a blue color to porcelain and glass. Cobalt blue in impure forms had long been used in Chinese porcelain. In 1742, Swedish chemist Georg Brandt showed that the blue color was due to a previously unidentified metal, cobalt. The first recorded use of cobalt blue as a color name in English was in 1777. It was independently discovered as an alumina-based pigment by Louis Jacques Thénard in 1802. Commercial production began in France in 1807. The leading world manufacturer of cobalt blue in the nineteenth century was Benjamin Wegner's Norwegian company Blaafarveværket ("blue colour works" in Dano-Norwegian). Germany was also famous for production of it, especially the blue colour works (Blaufarbenwerke) in the Ore Mountains of Saxony.

Cobalt glass is used decoratively, and also as an optical filter to remove or hide certain visible colors.

== In human culture ==
Art

- Cobalt blue was the primary blue pigment used for centuries in Chinese blue and white porcelain, beginning in the late eighth or early ninth century.
- Islamic pottery has a strong history of cobalt use, especially Iznik ceramic dishes and tiles starting in the 1400s.
- Traditional Bolesławiec pottery from Poland (also called Bunzlauer in German) made an extensive use of cobalt blue glaze. The pigment was used along with white in classic patterns of blue and white dots before the synthetic production of more variously colored pigments (yielding such colors as green, red, orange).
- Watercolorist John Varley suggested cobalt blue as a good substitution for ultramarine for painting skies, writing in his "List of Colours" from 1818: "Used as a substitute for ultramarine in its brightness of colour, and superior when used in skies and other objects, which require even tints; used occasionally in retrieving the brightness of those tints when too heavy, and for tints in drapery, etc. Capable, by its superior brilliancy and contrast, to subdue the brightness of other blues."
- Cobalt blue has been used in paintings since its discovery by Thénard, by painters such as J. M. W. Turner, Impressionists such as Pierre-Auguste Renoir and Claude Monet, and Post-Impressionists such as Vincent van Gogh. It is stable and lightfast and also compatible with all other pigments.
- Maxfield Parrish, known for the intensity of his skyscapes, frequently used cobalt blue.
- Cobalt blue is a commonly used color for interior decorating.

Automobiles

- Several car manufacturers including Jeep and Bugatti have cobalt blue as paint options.

Construction

- Because of its chemical stability in the presence of alkali, cobalt blue is used as a pigment in blue concrete.

Sports

- Two Major League Soccer teams have cobalt blue as a secondary color: Real Salt Lake from its inception, and Sporting Kansas City on its home uniforms since 2008.

Vexillology

- Several countries including the Netherlands and Romania, and a U.S. state – Nevada – have cobalt blue as one of the colors of their flags.

Video games

- Sega's official logo color is cobalt blue. Sonic the Hedgehog, Sega's current mascot, was colored to match.

== Toxicity ==
Cobalt blue is toxic when ingested or inhaled. Its use requires appropriate precautions to avoid internal contamination and to prevent cobalt poisoning.

== Gallery ==
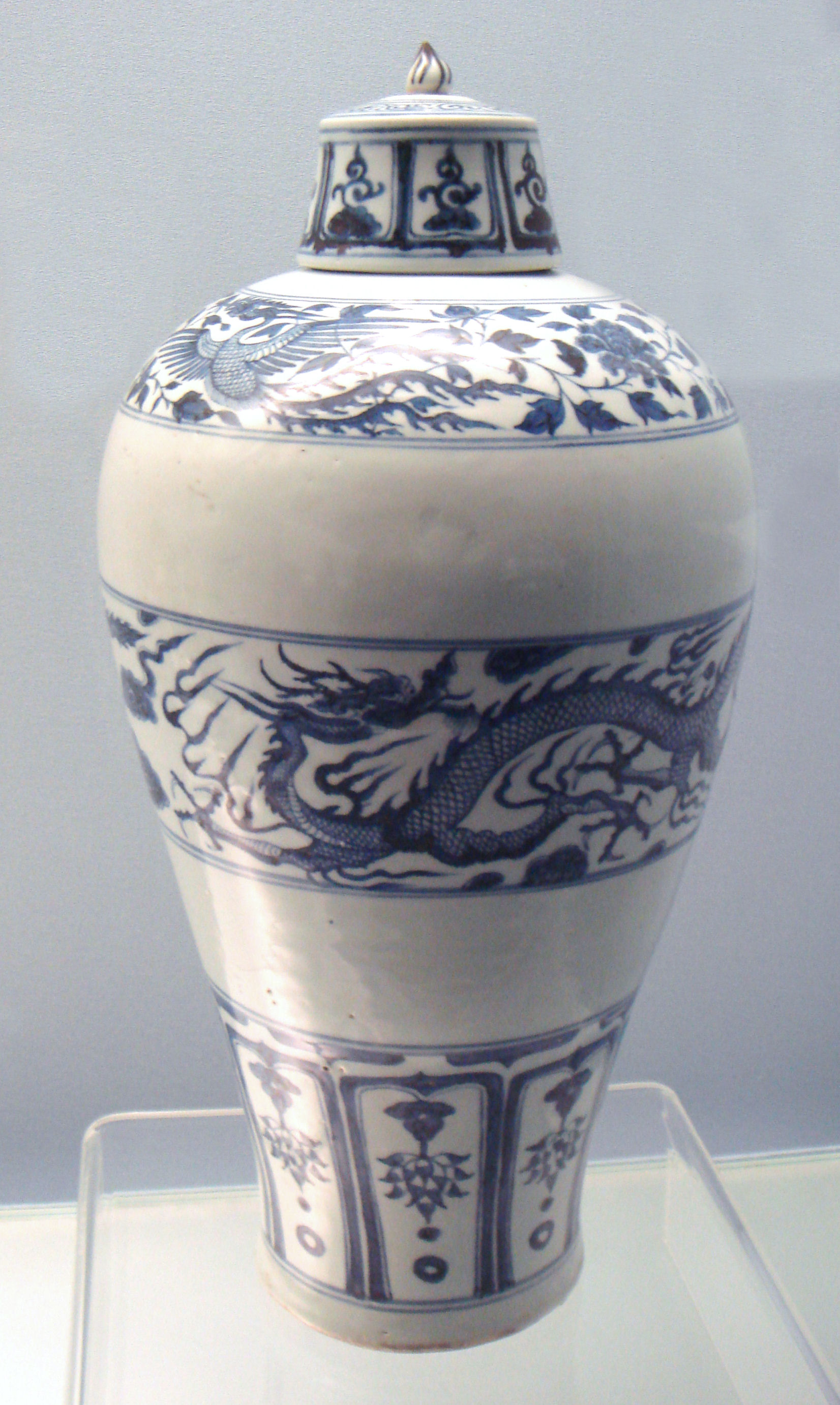
Blue and white vase from the Yuan dynasty (1271–1368), Jingdezhen, unearthed in Jiangxi Province

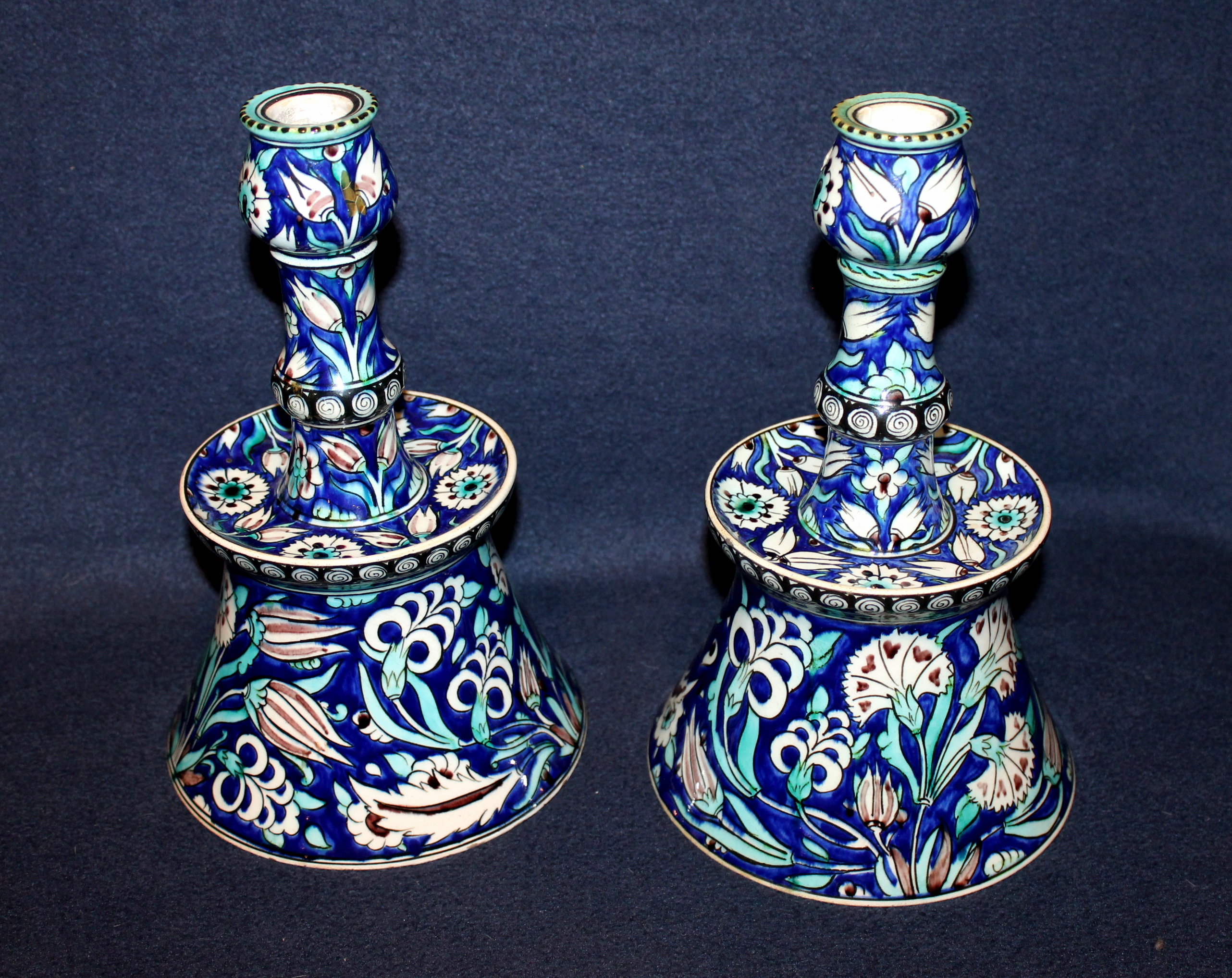
İznik Pottery Candlesticks, Ottoman Empire, Türkiye

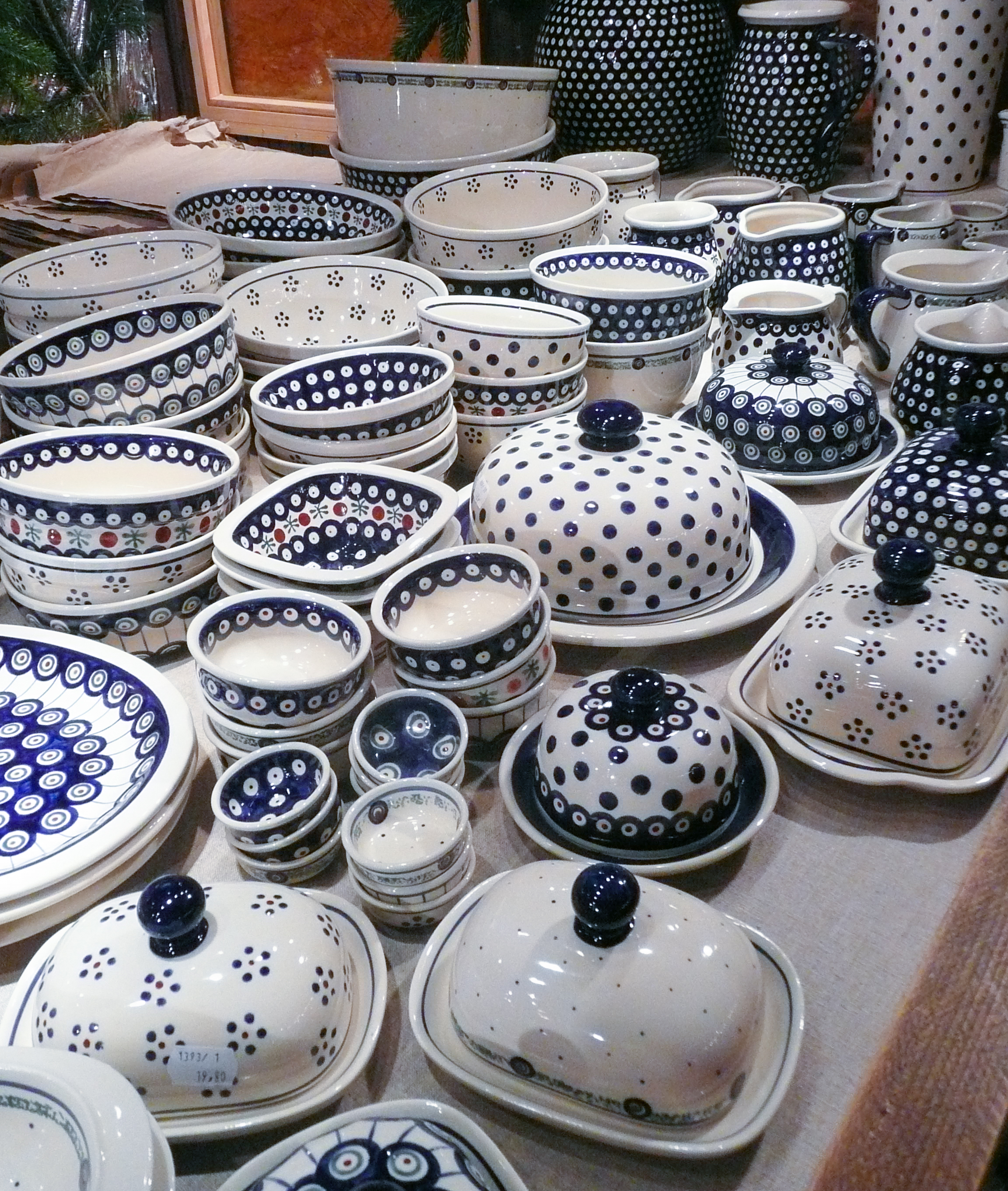
Selection of handcrafted Polish pottery products

An example of cobalt blue hue (not pure cobalt blue)

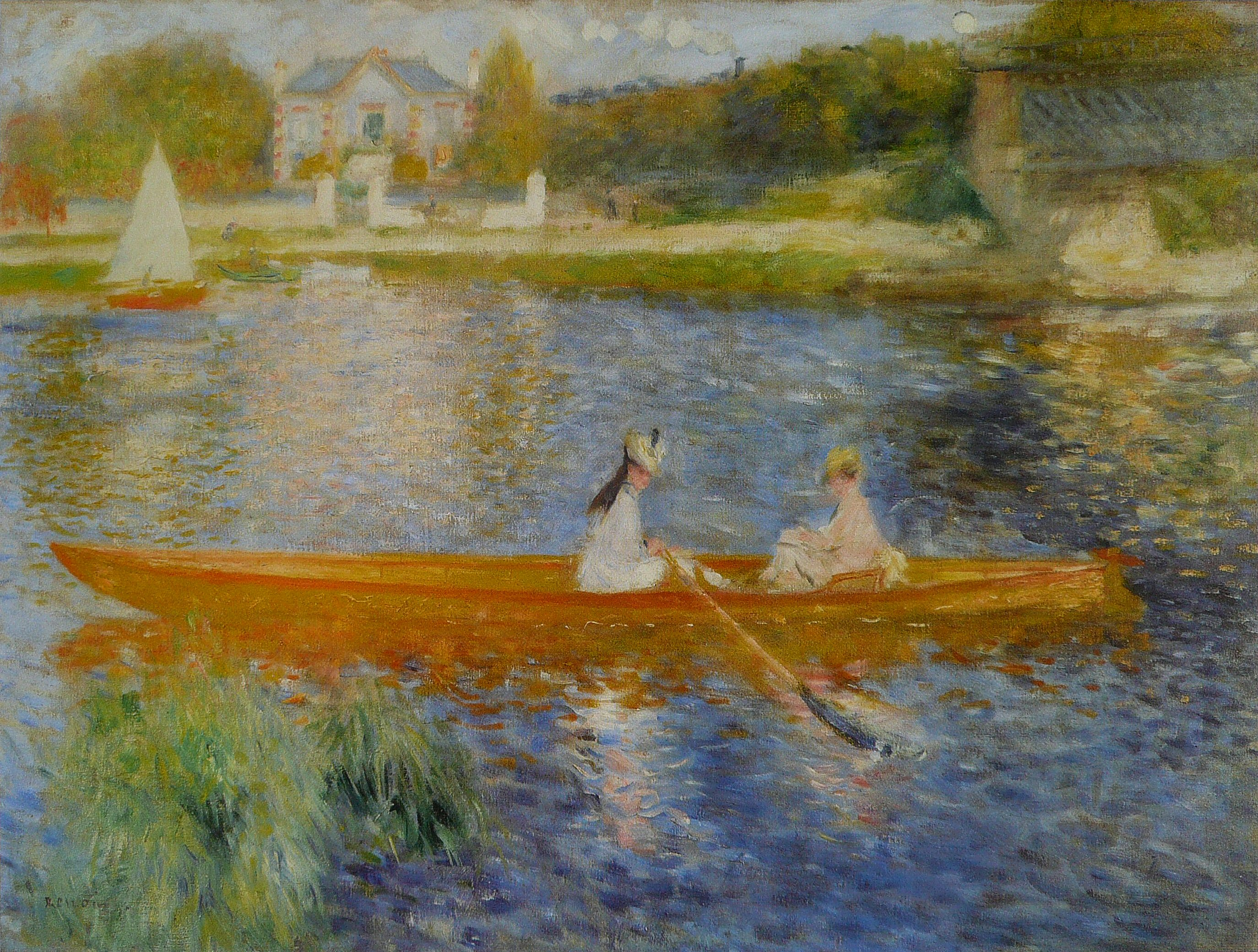
Pierre-Auguste Renoir, Boating on the Seine (La Yole), c. 1879

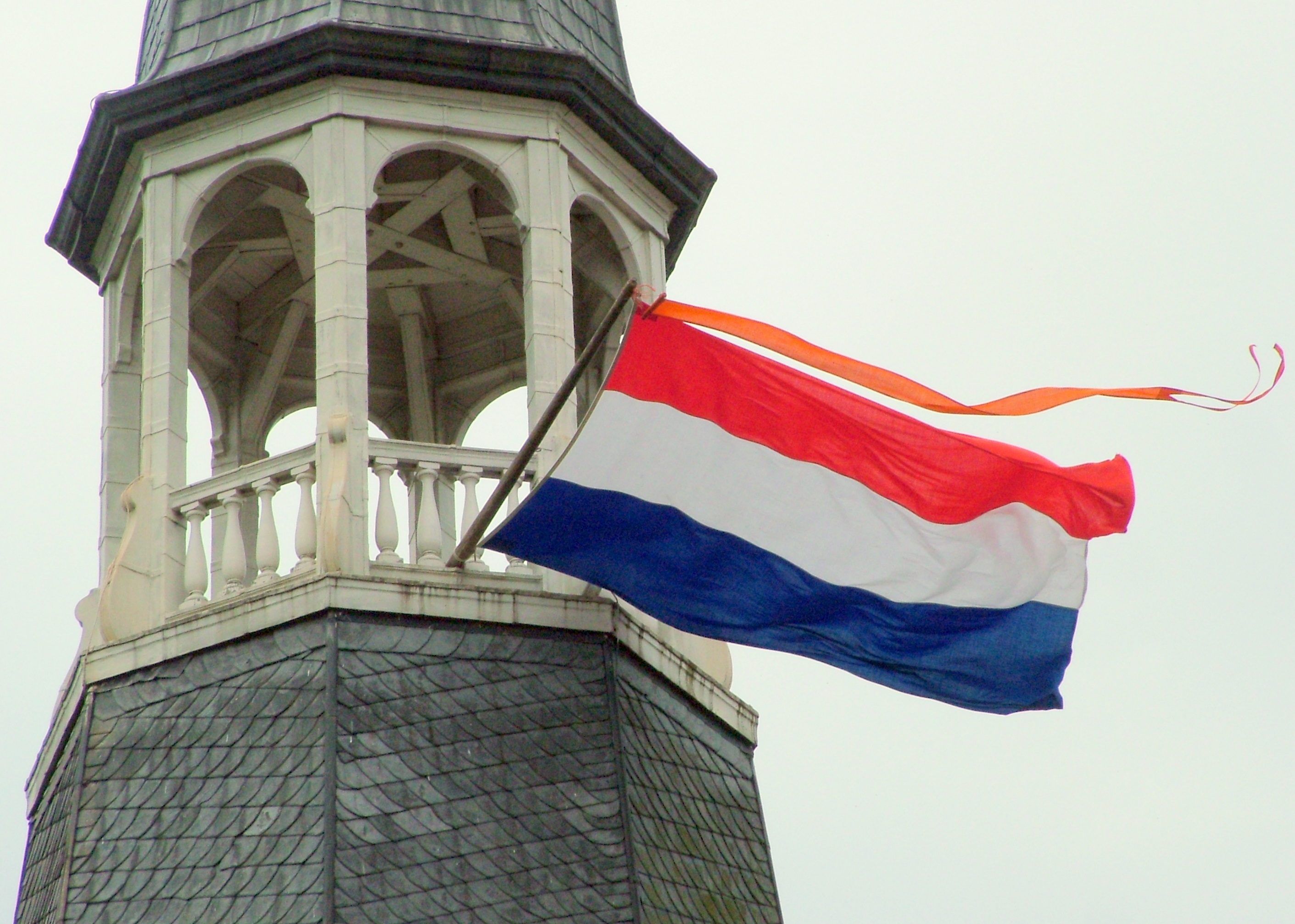
National flag of the Netherlands

== See also ==
- RAL 5013 Cobalt blue
- Lists of colors
- List of inorganic pigments
- Cobalt phosphate
