= Cobalt(II,III) oxide =

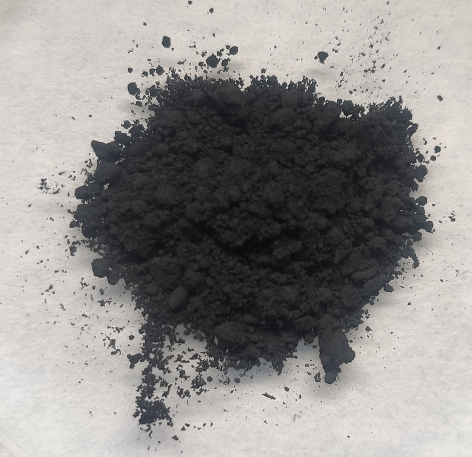
- Cobalt(II,III) oxide

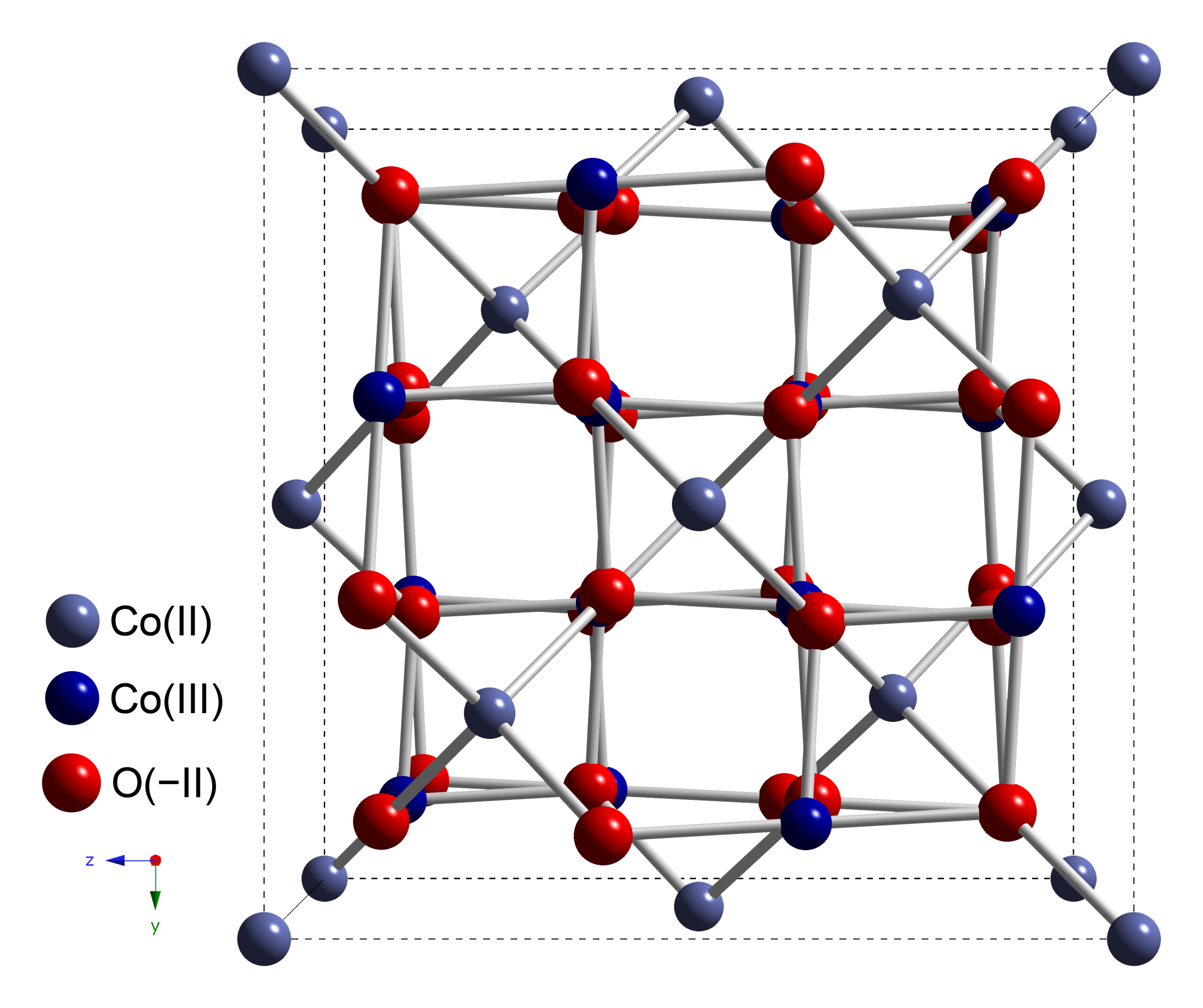
- Ball-and-stick model of the unit cell of Co3O4

Names
- IUPAC name cobalt(II) dicobalt(III) oxide
- Other names: Cobalt oxide; Cobalt(II,III) oxide; Cobaltosic oxide; Tricobalt tetroxide

Identifiers
CAS Number	1308-06-1
3D model (JSmol)	Interactive image
ChemSpider	9826389
ECHA InfoCard	100.013.780
EC Number	215-157-2
PubChem CID	11651651
RTECS number	GG2500000
UNII	USK772NS56
CompTox Dashboard (EPA)	DTXSID80892420
- InChI: InChI=1S/3Co.4O Key: LBFUKZWYPLNNJC-UHFFFAOYSA-N; InChI=1/3Co.4O/rCo2O3.CoO/c3-1-5-2-4;1-2 Key: LBFUKZWYPLNNJC-PMPQCLQHAA
- SMILES: [Co]=O.O=[Co]O[Co]=O

Properties
Chemical formula	Co_{3}O_{4}; CoO·Co_{2}O_{3}
Molar mass	240.796 g·mol^{−1}
Appearance	black solid
Density	6.07 g/cm^{3}
Melting point	895 °C (1,643 °F; 1,168 K)
Boiling point	900 °C (1,650 °F; 1,170 K) (decomposes)
Solubility in water	Insoluble
Solubility	soluble (with degradation) in acids and alkalis
Magnetic susceptibility (χ)	7380×10^{−6} cm^{3}/mol

Structure
Crystal structure	cubic
Space group	Fd3̅m, No. 227

Hazards
- GHS labelling
Pictograms	(GHS09: Environmental hazard) (GHS08: Health hazard)
Signal word	Danger
Hazard statements	H317, H334, H350, H411
Precautionary statements	P261, P273, P284, P304+P340, P342+P311
NFPA 704 (fire diamond)	2 0 0
- Except where otherwise noted, data are given for materials in their standard state (at 25 °C [77 °F], 100 kPa). verify (what is ?) Infobox references

Cobalt(II,III) oxide is an inorganic compound with the formula Co_{3}O_{4}. Along with cobalt(II) oxide, it is one of two well characterized and stable cobalt oxides. It is a black antiferromagnetic solid. As a mixed valence compound, its formula is sometimes written as Co^{2+}Co^{3+}_{2}O_{4} and sometimes as CoO·Co_{2}O_{3}. It occurs naturally as the rare mineral guite which is named in honor of Prof. Xiangping Gu (1964-).

== Structure ==
Co_{3}O_{4} adopts the normal spinel structure, with Co^{2+} ions in tetrahedral interstices and Co^{3+} ions in the octahedral interstices of the cubic close-packed lattice of oxide anions.

tetrahedral coordination geometry of Co(II)	distorted octahedral coordination geometry of Co(III)	distorted tetrahedral coordination geometry of O

== Synthesis ==
Cobalt(II) oxide, CoO, converts to Co_{3}O_{4} upon heating at around 600–700 °C (1,112–1,292 °F) in air. Above 900 °C (1,650 °F), CoO is stable. These reactions are described by the following equilibrium:

2 Co_{3}O_{4} ⇌ 6 CoO + O_{2}

== Applications ==
Cobalt(II,III) oxide is used as a blue coloring agent for pottery enamel and glass, as an alternative to cobalt(II) oxide.

Cobalt(II,III) oxide is used as an electrode in some lithium-ion batteries, possibly in the form of cobalt oxide nanoparticles.

Cobalt(III) fluoride can be prepared from cobalt(II,III) oxide by sequential treatment with hydrogen fluoride and then fluorine gas, producing a mixture of cobalt(II) fluoride and cobalt oxyfluoride as intermediates, with overall stoichiometry:

Co_{3}O_{4} + 4 HF → CoF_{2} + 2 CoOF + 2 H_{2}O
2 CoF_{2} + 4 CoOF + 5 F_{2} → 6 CoF_{3} + 2 O_{2}

== See also ==
- Cobalt(II) oxide
- Cobalt(III) oxide
- Iron(II,III) oxide
