= Cobalt oxide nanoparticle =

In materials and electric battery research, cobalt oxide nanoparticles usually refers to particles of cobalt(II,III) oxide Co_{3}O_{4} of nanometer size, with various shapes and crystal structures.

Cobalt oxide nanoparticles have potential applications in lithium-ion batteries and electronic gas sensors.

== Applications ==
=== Lithium-ion battery ===
The cathodes of lithium-ion batteries are often made of lithiated oxides of cobalt, nickel, or manganese, that can readily and reversibly incorporate lithium ions in their molecular structure. Cobalt oxide nanomaterials, such as nanotubes, offer high surface-to-volume ratio and short path lengths for lithium cation transport, leading to fast charging capabilities. However, capacity, coulombic efficiency, and cycle life may suffer due to excessive formation of SEI. The nanowires may incorporate other substances, for example, diphenylalanine.

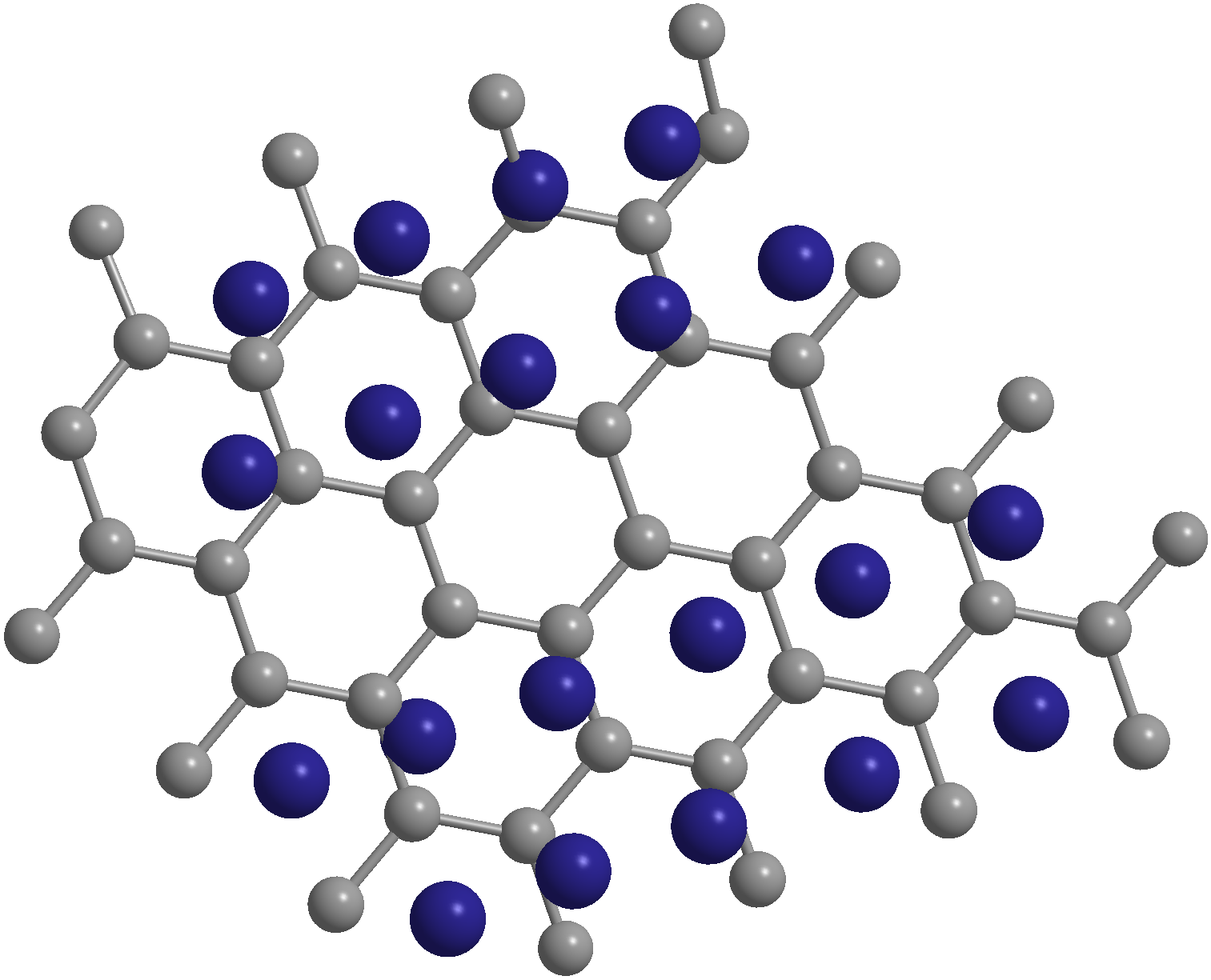
Cobalt oxide (Co_{3}O_{4}) nanoparticles anchored on a single sheet of graphene.

Cobalt oxide particles may be anchored on substrates such as graphene to improve the dimensional stability of the anode and to prevent particle aggregation during lithium charge and discharge processes.

=== Gas sensor ===
Hollow nanospheres of cobalt oxide have been investigated as materials for gas sensor electrodes, for the detection of toluene, acetone, and other organic vapors.

Cobalt oxide nanoparticles anchored on single-walled carbon nanotubes have been investigated for sensing nitrogen oxides NO_{x} and hydrogen. This application takes advantage of the reactivity between the gas and the oxide, as well as the electrical connection with the substrate (both being p-type semiconductors). Nitrogen oxides react with the oxide as electron acceptors, reducing the electrode's resistance; whereas hydrogen acts as an electron donor, increasing the resistance.

=== Medicine ===
Cobalt oxide nanoparticles have been observed to readily enter cells, a property that conceivably could lead to applications in hyperthermic treatment, gene therapy and drug delivery. However, their toxicity is an obstacle that would have to be overcome.

== Synthesis ==
=== Hydrothermal ===
Cobalt oxide is often obtained by hydrothermal synthesis in an autoclave.

One-pot hydrothermal synthesis of metal oxide hollow spheres starts with carbohydrates and metal salts dissolved in water at 100-200 °C. The reaction produces carbon spheres, with metal ions integrated into the hydrophobic shell. The carbon cores are removed by calcination, leaving hollow metal oxide spheres. Surface area and thickness of the shell can be manipulated by varying the carbohydrate to metal salt concentration, as well as the temperature, pressure, and pH of the reaction medium, and the cations of the starting salts. The completion time for the procedure varies from hours to days.

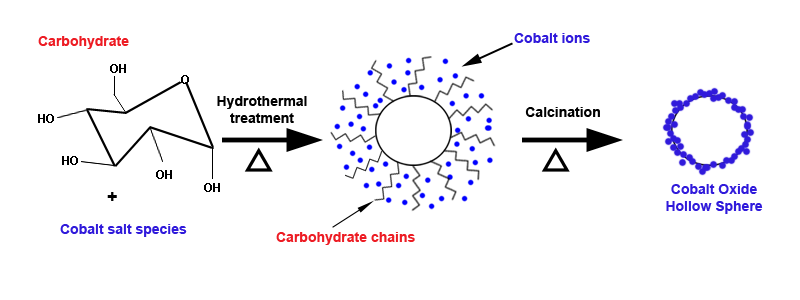
Hydrothermal Synthesis of Cobalt Oxide Hollow Sphere.

A drawback of this approach is its smaller yield compared to other methods.

=== Thermal decomposition ===
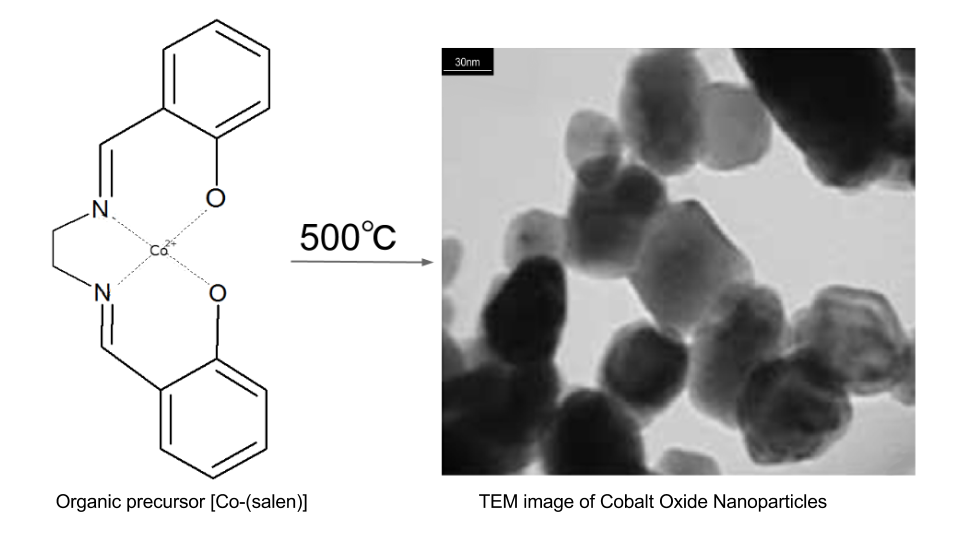
TEM image (right) of cobalt oxide nanoparticles produced by thermal decomposition of organometallic precursor Co-salen (left).

Another route to the synthesis of cobalt oxide nanoparticles is the thermal decomposition of organometallic compounds. For example, heating the metal salen complex bis(salicylaldehyde)ethylenediiminecobalt(II) ("Co-salen") in air to 500 °C. The precursor Co-salen can be obtained by reacting cobalt(II) acetate tetrahydrate in propanol at 50 °C under nitrogen atmosphere with the salen ligand (bis(salicylaldehyde)ethylenediimine).

=== From anchored precursors ===
Cobalt oxide/graphene composite are synthesized by first forming cobalt(II) hydroxide Co(OH)_{2} on the graphene sheet from a cobalt(II) salt and ammonium hydroxide NH_{4}OH, which is then heated to 450 °C for two hours to yield the oxide.

== Safety ==
Like most cobalt compounds, cobalt oxide nanoparticles are toxic to humans and also aquatic life.
