= Fulper Pottery Company =

American ceramics manufacturer

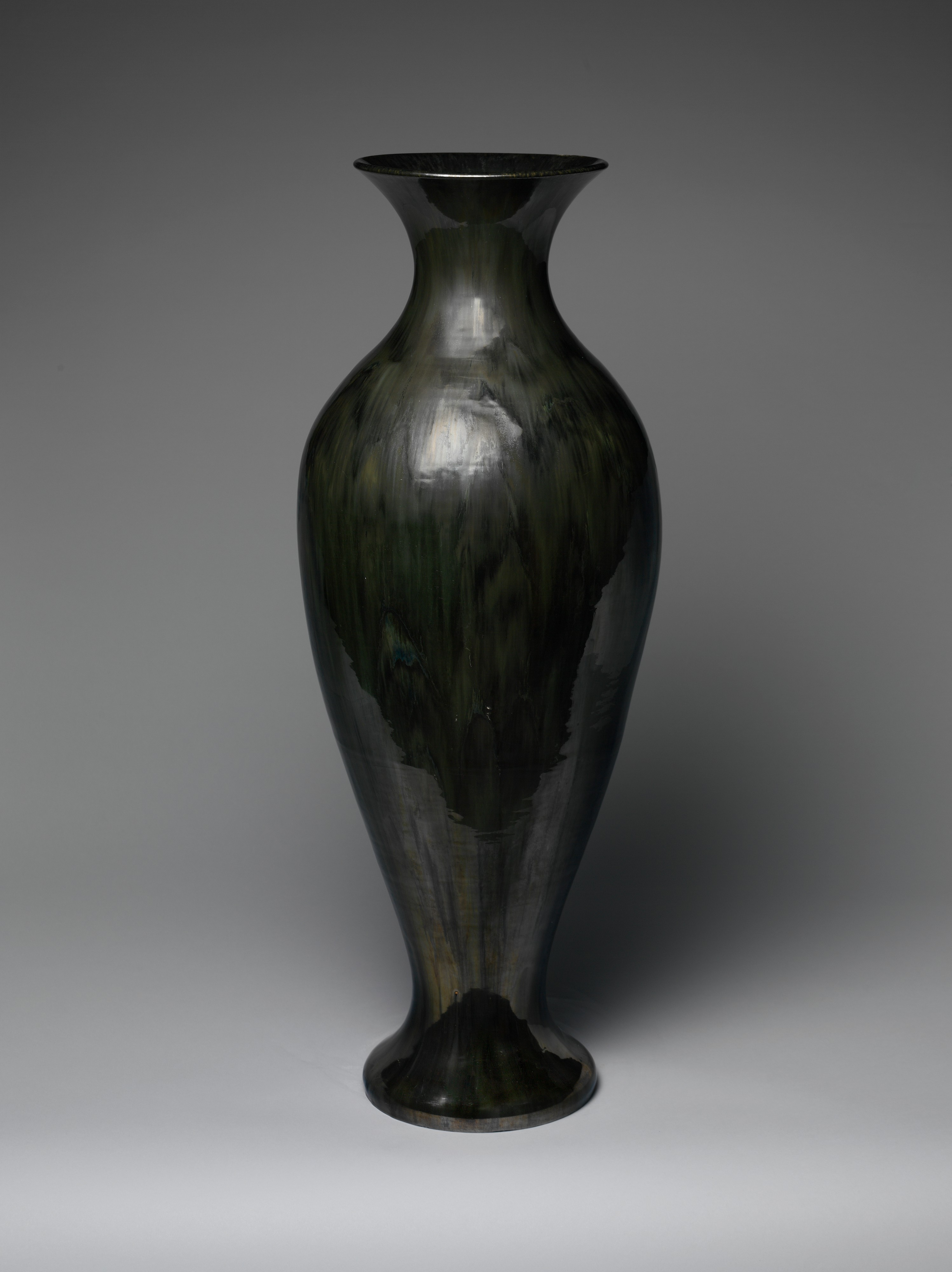
Vase by Fulper Pottery Company. Metropolitan Museum of Art (1984.256). One of a pair of monumental vases made for the Vasekraft display at the 1915 Panama–Pacific International Exposition in San Francisco. The company won a gold Medal of Honor for its display.

Fulper Pottery Company was a ceramics manufacturer in Flemington, New Jersey, active from about 1814 until the mid-1930s. Founded as the Hill Pottery, it made utilitarian wares for most of its history before introducing its first art pottery line, Vasekraft, in 1909. Fulper's art pottery belongs to the American Arts and Crafts movement and is best remembered for its simple molded forms and wide range of mirrored, flambé, matte, lustre, and crystalline glazes.

Fulper's art pottery developed under a group of designers and technicians: potter John Kunsman Jr., ceramic engineer J. Martin Stangl (who joined the firm in 1910), and chemist Cullen W. Parmelee were all involved in its forms and glaze chemistry. Early products included the "First Fifteen" cabinet vases and a line of pottery-based electric lamps, and the company received the Medal of Honor for its pottery at the 1915 Panama–Pacific International Exposition. Production peaked between 1917 and 1923, when Fulper's catalog offered 200 to 300 forms and its wares were sold through roughly 1,200 retail stores in the United States as well as international distributors. The art pottery line contracted through the 1920s as Fulper introduced other product brands, and J. Martin Stangl acquired the company in 1930. Fulper's art pottery line was discontinued in 1934, after which production continued under the Stangl Pottery name.

Fulper pottery is held in the collections of the Metropolitan Museum of Art, the Smithsonian Institution, the Los Angeles County Museum of Art, and the Art Institute of Chicago, among other institutions. In 2018 the Metropolitan Museum of Art accessioned a group of Fulper works from the collection of Robert A. Ellison Jr.; the accompanying publication, American Art Pottery: The Robert A. Ellison Jr. Collection, devotes a chapter to the company's history and production.

== History ==
=== Origins (1814–1899) ===
The pottery that became the Fulper Pottery Company was founded around 1814 in Flemington, New Jersey, when Samuel Hill built a pottery near local clay deposits and began making drain tiles and other utilitarian earthenware. Abraham Fulper joined the business in the 1830s, took control of it in 1857, and owned it outright by 1864. After his death in 1881, his sons Charles and Wilson ran the pottery as Fulper Brothers. The firm, by then known as Fulper Bros. and Co., went bankrupt in 1898, and the business was reincorporated the following year as the Fulper Pottery Company. The new company was officially incorporated on March 24, 1899, by four members of the Fulper family: George W. Fulper (president), Mary C. Fulper, Edward B. Fulper (vice president), and William H. Fulper (secretary and treasurer), with William also serving as the pottery's manager.

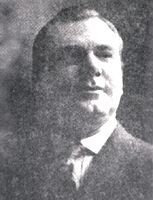
William Hill Fulper II

In 1895 the Fulper brothers bought the O. H. Smith and Brothers Pottery, also in Flemington, along with the patent rights to Smith's stoneware water cooler. The resulting "Germ-Proof" water filters and fire-proof cookware became a steady source of income, which later allowed the company to experiment with art pottery.

=== Early experiments and the road to Vasekraft (1897–1909) ===
Although Fulper's move into art pottery is most often dated to 1909, the firm had experimented with decorative glazed wares for at least a decade by that time. A three-handled vase dated 1897 shows an early attempt at a colored glaze, and a slip-cast stoneware pitcher dated 1902, inscribed as the "first cast piece" produced at the pottery, points to an early shift toward mold-cast pottery and colored glaze work.

The 1902 pitcher was made by John Kunsman Jr., a potter who joined the Fulper works in 1889 after training with his father, also a potter, in Germany and France before the family immigrated to the United States. Around 1905–1909, Kunsman developed a short-lived line loosely based on Native American pottery, likely influenced by similar work at the Clifton Pottery in Newark, New Jersey. Kunsman later recalled that both he and William H. Fulper were responding to the growing market for art wares.

Fulper's first public art-pottery line, Vasekraft, was announced in trade advertisements in December 1909, timed to the Christmas gift season. The initial pieces were advertised as hand-thrown and finished in an "Old Rose Matte" glaze, marketed as comparable to antique Chinese wares.

=== Glaze development and the arrival of Stangl (1908–1911) ===
J. Martin Stangl, who joined Fulper in early 1910, later claimed that Old Rose Matte was the only successful glaze the firm had achieved before his arrival. The pottery's surviving glaze formula notebooks (handwritten volumes still held by Fulper family descendants) contradict this. They record experiments from at least March 1908, before the Vasekraft line existed, including trials in a range of matte and crystalline glazes. Much of this early experimentation was guided by Cullen W. Parmelee, a chemistry professor who in 1902 became the first faculty member of the Department of Clay-Working and Ceramics at Rutgers University and who advised Fulper on glaze chemistry.

Stangl, a graduate of the Royal Ceramic Technical School in Bunzlau, Germany, was hired in early 1910 to redevelop the Vasekraft line after its initial 1909 launch performed poorly. He served as the pottery's superintendent from at least October 1911. William H. Fulper, who owned and managed the company, also took part in the design process; Stangl later said that Fulper supplied many of the ideas while he executed the designs. Kunsman also remained involved in design work during this period. According to a later recollection by William H. Fulper's son, William H. Fulper III, Kunsman gave live wheel-throwing demonstrations as part of the firm's promotional exhibitions, including displays at retail venues such as Tiffany & Co., Ovington's, and Bailey, Banks and Biddle. In the pottery's later years, the designer Ogden Winner Kugler (also credited by Fulper III as having "developed the lion's share of the forms") became its chief designer.

=== Growth and peak production (1911–1923) ===
With Stangl’s technical contributions, Fulper relaunched Vasekraft with new forms and glazes. The line had about 35 products in mid-1910, and lamps and new vases were added by early 1911. The company employed around 75 people by 1911. That year, Fulper introduced its pottery lamps and exhibited Vasekraft nationally, and at the 1915 Panama–Pacific International Exposition in San Francisco its Vasekraft display won the Medal of Honor.

Output peaked between 1917 and 1923, when each catalog offered 200 to 300 forms. By 1919 Fulper pottery was sold through about 1,200 retail stores across the United States and distributed internationally to shops in Europe, Australia, Japan, Canada, Central America, and South America, with company showrooms in New York, Chicago, Los Angeles, San Francisco, London, Paris, Milan, and Buenos Aires.

=== Decline, the 1929 fire, and transition to Stangl Pottery (1924–1934) ===
Beginning in 1924, Fulper introduced several new, more limited product lines (Fulper Porcelains, Fulper Fayence, and later Fulper Primitive) and the art pottery catalog shrank accordingly, from 195 forms in 1923 to 99 in 1924, and to as few as 37 by 1933. In early 1928 the company opened a new production facility in Trenton, at the former plant of the Anchor Pottery Company. William H. Fulper died of a heart attack on October 15, 1928, at age 56, after which Stangl assumed sole direction of the business.

On September 19, 1929, a fire destroyed Fulper's main pottery complex in Flemington. Art pottery production was shifted to the company's second Flemington plant, while other production moved to the Trenton facility. J. Martin Stangl acquired the company in 1930. Fulper also introduced Art Deco forms in this period, which its advertisements called "Moderne." The style had been popularized at the 1925 Exposition Internationale des Arts Décoratifs et Industriels Modernes in Paris.

Despite the change in ownership, the pottery continued to be produced and marked under the Fulper name for several more years. According to Martha Stangl, J. Martin Stangl's daughter and a manager at the pottery, the Fulper art pottery line was discontinued in 1934, when the second Flemington plant was converted into a retail showroom; production was marketed under the Stangl name from that point on. The company was not formally re-registered as the Stangl Pottery Company until 1955.

== Pottery ==
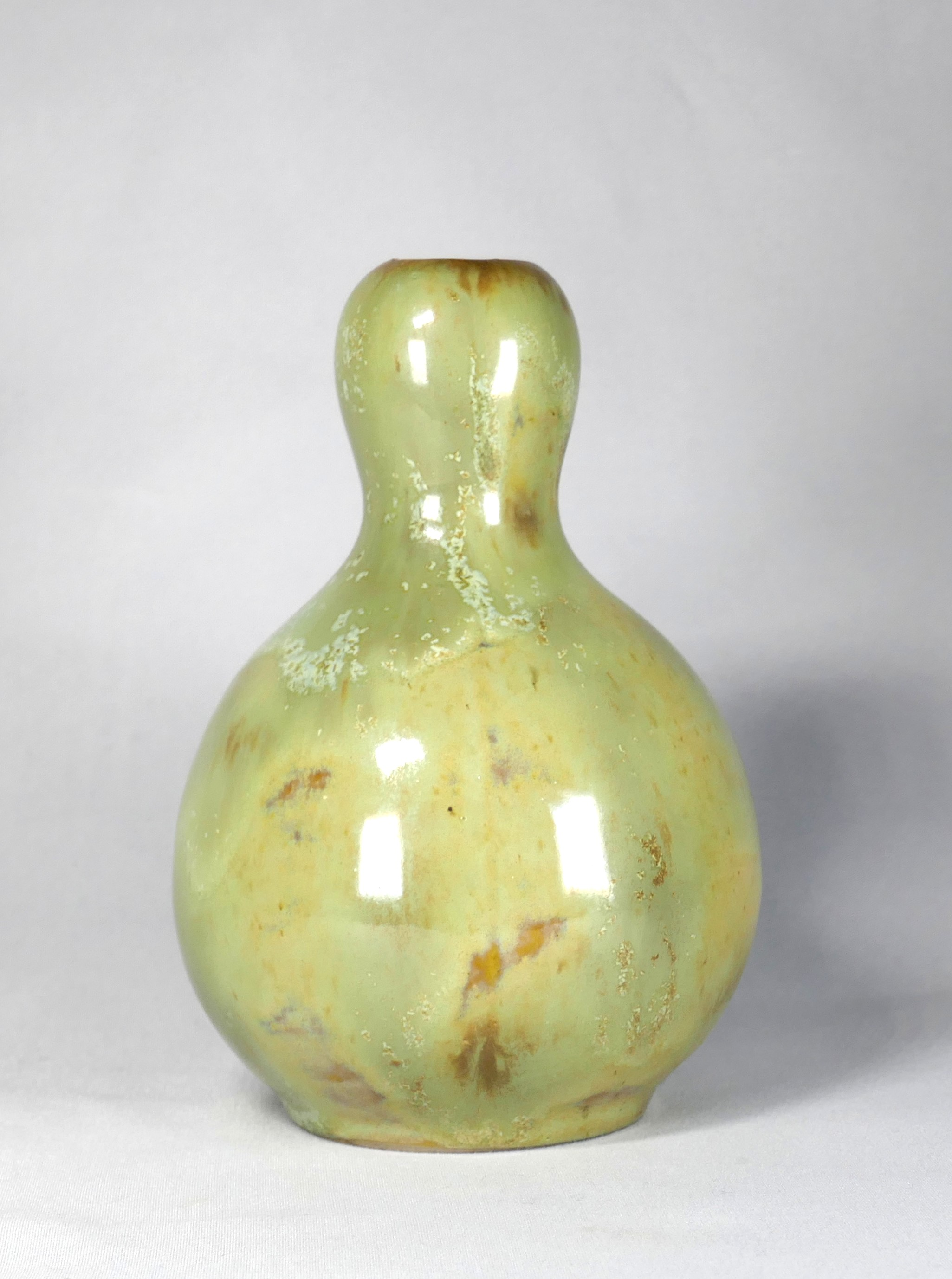
Fulper Vasekraft Shape Number 15 with an early Leopardskin Crystalline glaze, Rectangular Ink Mark. c. 1909-1914.

=== Design influences and forms ===
Fulper's shapes drew on Asian, Islamic, and classical sources, and its style changed over the company's history. Fulper's designers had access to nearby museum collections, including those of the Princeton University Art Museum, the Newark Museum, and the Philadelphia Museum of Art. William H. Fulper was himself a member of the Metropolitan Museum of Art and may have encountered its collections directly or through the museum's Bulletin. According to Hibel, Hibel, and DeFalco, Vasekraft-period Fulper pottery falls into three stylistic families: Arts & Crafts designs, Asian-influenced, and Classical-influenced. During the 1920s and early 1930s the company turned toward Art Deco and Art Moderne forms. A small group of early forms does not fit easily into these categories. Hibel, Hibel, and DeFalco place these forms within the Arts & Crafts stream, while Frelinghuysen, Eidelberg, and Spinozzi trace them to progressive German design of the period.

==== Arts & Crafts forms ====
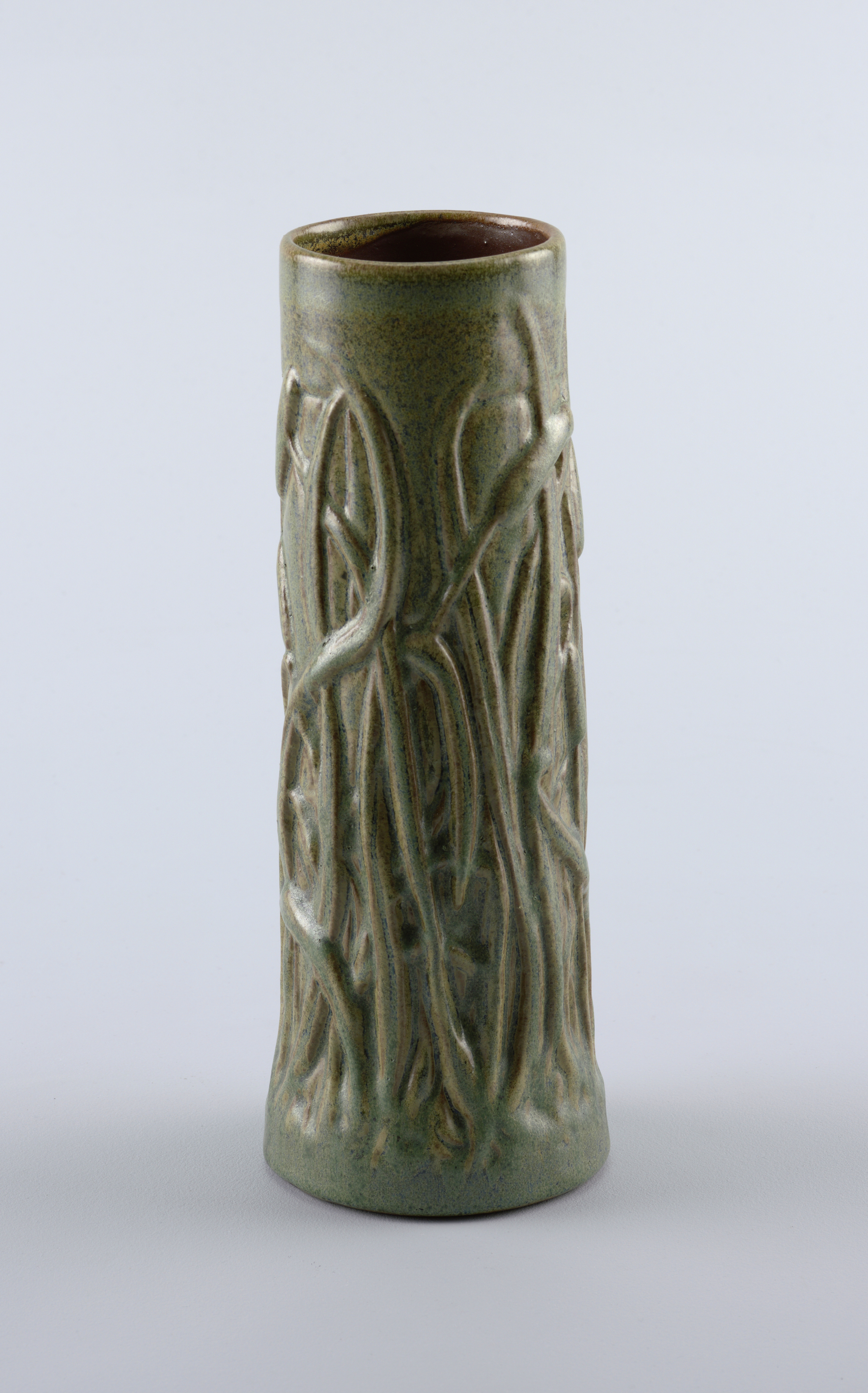
Vase decorated with molded cattail relief, c. 1909–1915. Cooper Hewitt, Smithsonian Design Museum (1984-84-47).

Fulper's Vasekraft pottery was part of the American Arts and Crafts movement. The company used simple shapes chiefly to display its wide range of glazes and, following the philosophy of Charles Fergus Binns, largely avoided applied decoration in favor of form and glaze. Despite the general American preference for organic forms and decoration, Fulper made only a few concessions to that trend. The cattails vase pictured here is one such exception, its molded relief accentuated by a green-and-brown glaze that pools in the recesses of the design. A smaller group of early Vasekraft vases took a more architectural approach, with spare, symmetrical bodies and faceted, buttressed shoulders. Hibel, Hibel, and DeFalco describe these as an early, rare Jugendstil form that surfaced too infrequently to have stayed in production long. Frelinghuysen, Eidelberg, and Spinozzi trace the same forms to progressive German design, comparing them to ceramics by the architect Peter Behrens and contrasting their variegated glazes with the uniform matte finishes Gates Potteries (Teco) used on similar geometric shapes.

==== Asian-inspired forms ====
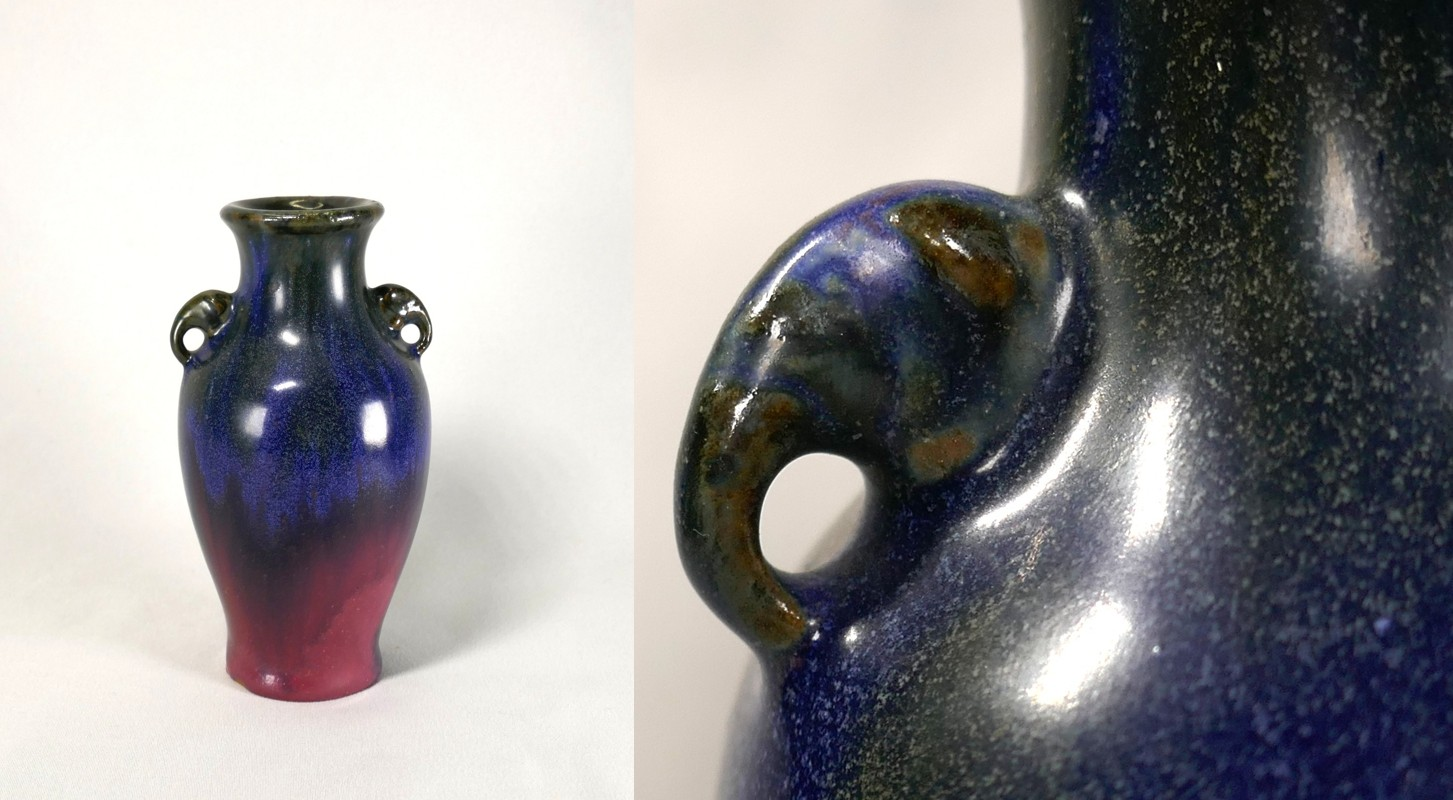
Fulper Vasekraft Shape No. 5, showing elephant-head handle detail.

Chinese ceramics were the main source of inspiration for Fulper's forms. Two loan exhibitions were probably important sources of this influence. The first was mounted in 1914 at the Knoedler Gallery in New York and the second two years later at the Metropolitan Museum; together they displayed more than two hundred ceramics from China, Japan, and Korea. Kornacki traces many of the First Fifteen cabinet vases to specific Chinese vessel types, from the Western Han dynasty to the Qing (see First Fifteen). Two of them, Nos. 5 and 8, also have elephant-head handles, a Chinese decorative element.

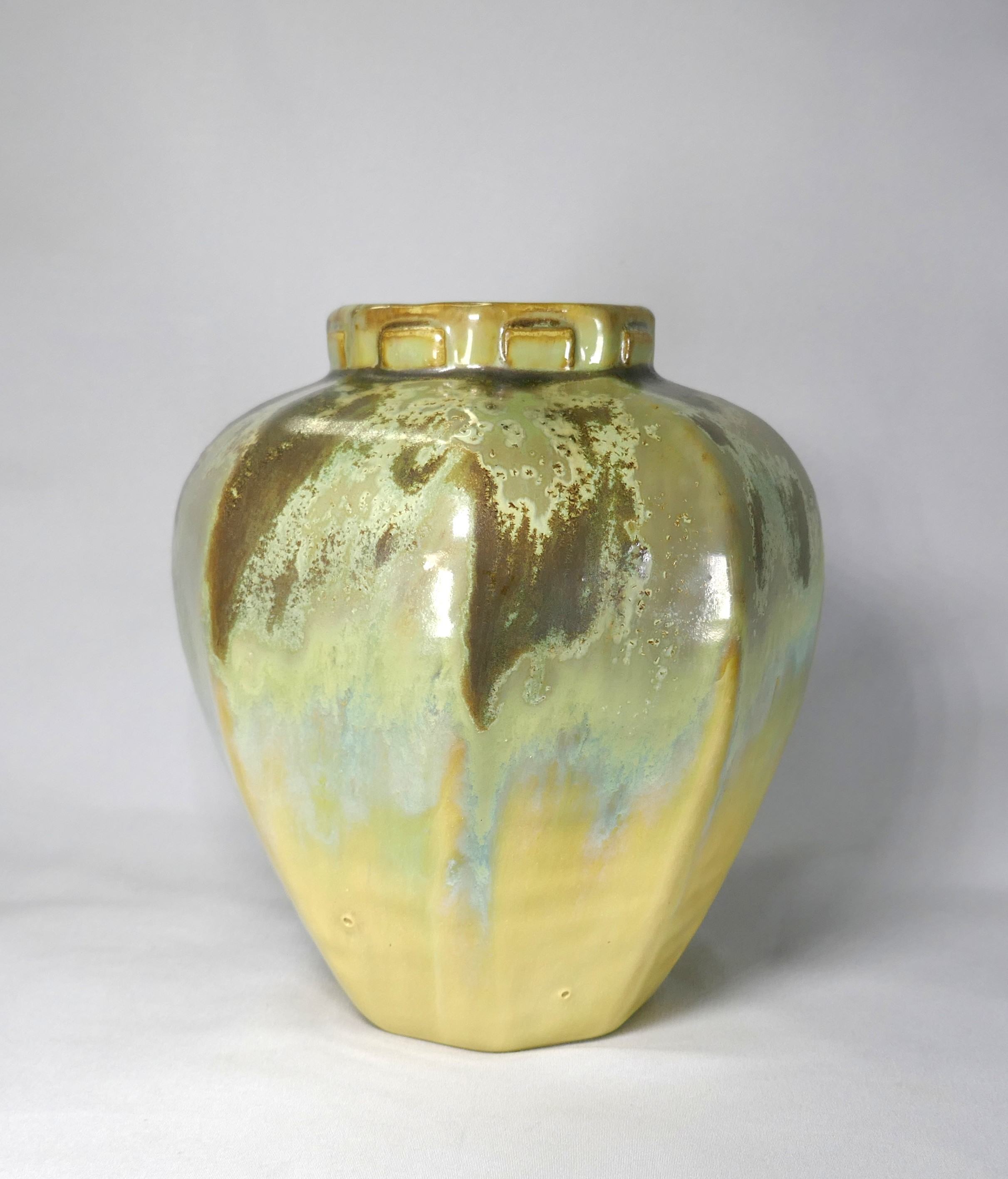
Fulper Pottery Shape No. 511 Oval Incised Mark, c.1917-1927.

Some pieces in the Ellison Collection can be linked to specific prototypes. A large Fulper vase closely follows the melon-shaped body, ringed collar, and trumpet neck of an eleventh-century Northern Song dynasty vase, though Fulper nearly doubled its scale and replaced the original's subtle bluish-white glaze with a bolder combination of bright blue and green. At fifty dollars, it was among the more expensive pieces listed in the pottery's 1922 catalog. A smaller, globular vase similarly adapts a Ming dynasty design, closely related in form but slightly reduced in size, with the original's milky-gray glaze replaced by livelier colored glazes.

One Fulper vessel in the collection, with elephant-head handles, a neck marked by deep, irregular throwing rings, and an outer wall pierced by four cusped openings, is described by Frelinghuysen, Eidelberg, and Spinozzi as the only known example of its form. While some of its elements are common to Chinese and Japanese ceramics and metalwork generally, the authors could not identify a specific model for the piece as a whole.

==== Classical-inspired forms ====
Some early Vasekraft forms also drew on ancient Greek sources. One ewer in the Ellison Collection appears to be modeled on an ancient Greek hydria, quite possibly one in the Metropolitan Museum's collection, which Fulper could have seen firsthand or in the museum's Bulletin. Its finish is very different from the Greek model. Thick black and orange glazes run partway down the vessel and leave the lower part of the buff-colored body bare, so the piece looks more like Japanese pottery with dripped glazes than Greek ware. Frelinghuysen, Eidelberg, and Spinozzi call it "an amalgam of different cultural influences."

Left: Fulper Pottery Shape No. 489 (c.1909–1917). Right: the Two-handled pottery vase of Amenhotep (c. 1550–1295 B.C.) (MET 60.38) Scholars have noted similarities between Shape No. 489 and Egyptian and Cypriote forms.

==== Later Fulper shapes: Art Deco and Art Moderne ====
Beginning in 1924, as the art pottery line shrank, Fulper introduced new shapes in the Art Deco style, which its advertisements called "Moderne." The style had been popularized at the 1925 Exposition Internationale des Arts Décoratifs et Industriels Modernes in Paris.

=== Glazes ===
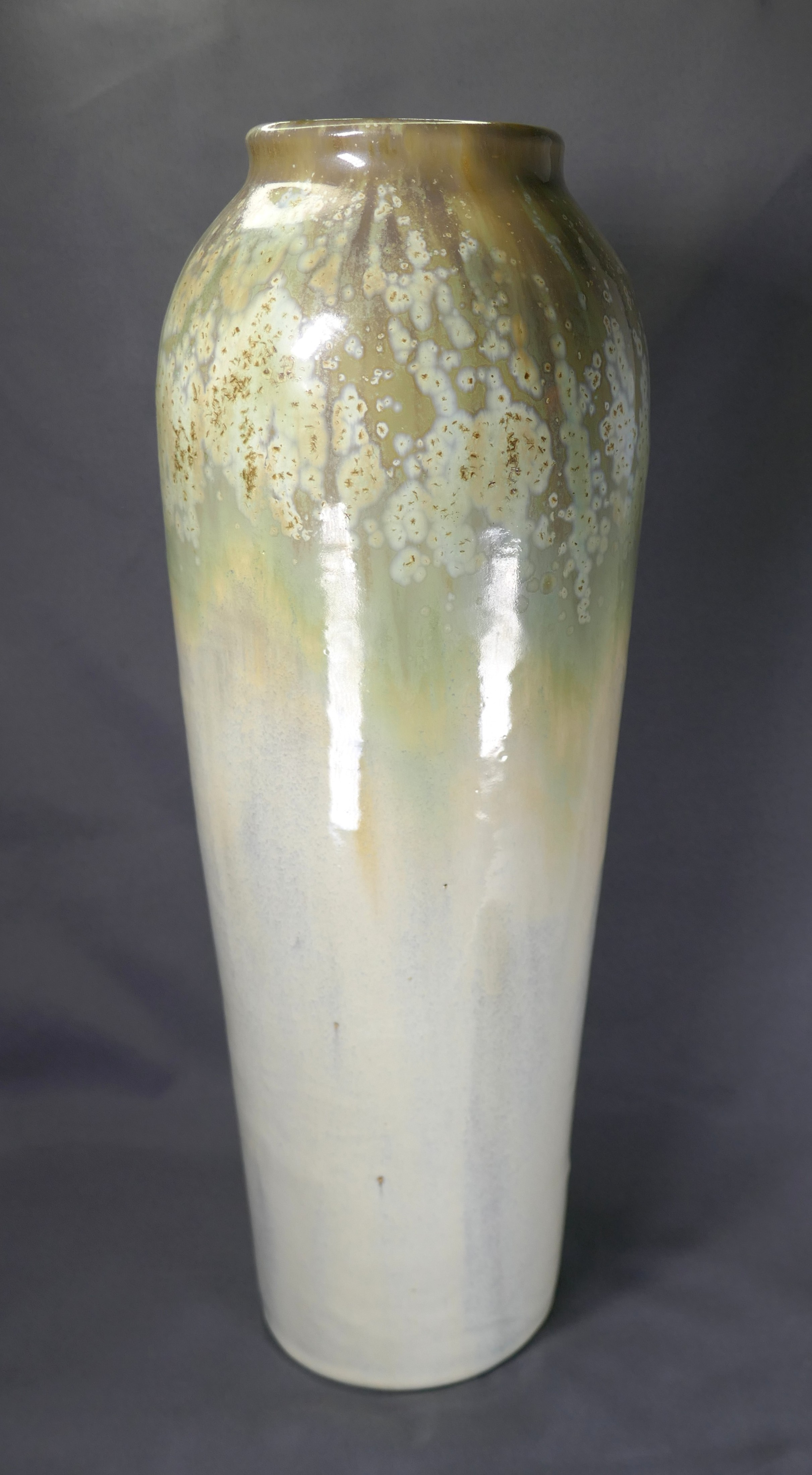
Fulper Pottery Shape No. 601 with a Crystalline over Yellow and white Flambe glaze, Oval Raised Mark. c.1917-1923.

Fulper's promotional materials framed glaze, rather than applied decoration, as the true measure of a pottery's quality, declaring that "without a glaze it lacks the finish of completeness, like a solid picture without a frame." This approach followed the philosophy of Charles Fergus Binns, an influential mentor to many American art potters. Fulper may have had direct contact with Binns as early as the late 1890s, when Binns directed the Technical School of Science and Art in Trenton, New Jersey, and the firm's first glaze experiments coincide with Binns's 1903 article "In Defence of Fire" in The Craftsman. According to Hibel, Hibel, and DeFalco, the company produced about 100 glazes during the Vasekraft era. Fulper's catalogs claimed that "Vase-Kraft has thousands" of glazes, a figure that counted combinations of colors and glaze types on a single piece. Kornacki notes that the number of glazes actually used on the lamps ran only to the dozens.

==== Glaze variation and kiln behavior ====
Fulper's glaze development involved extensive experimentation. For one glaze alone, the company tested ninety-two different blends. Its pottery was glazed and fired in a single step, so that body and glaze matured together. Company promotional materials described how heat was built up in the kiln over several days and carefully monitored during both firing and cooling, a practice that other American potters, including M. Louise McLaughlin and Merrimac Pottery, had already adopted. Blasberg notes, "The effect of single firing, that is, firing the clay body and glaze together at one time, made the fusion of the two more complete and the result often resembled organic substances such as cucumber skins, volcanic lava or mineral specimens of igneous rock." Fulper's natural, lightly refined clays added to the variation. In a 1913 account of Vasekraft, Evelyn Marie Stuart observed that "the glaze 'steals' from the body in firing, particles of mineral in the body producing variations in color or crystalline effects in the glaze."

Flambé glazes, built up from two or three colors superimposed one over another, often produced unpredictable color effects, and crystalline glazes required careful control of the kiln to form their crystal patterns. According to The Fulper Book, "Cucumber Crystalline and Leopardskin Crystalline are either the same glaze formulas responding differently in different kilns, or... almost identical formulas with one or two modifications."

==== Glaze types ====
Fulper's catalogs divided its Vasekraft glazes into classes based on tone and texture. Mirrored glazes were highly reflective and usually a single color, "comparable only with patches of sky in single color." Flambé glazes, also mirrored, blended one color into another and were likened to "the gorgeous colors seen in the sky at sunset in autumn." Lustre glazes gave off an iridescence "similar to oil on water." Crystal glazes contained visible crystals, which the company admitted it did not fully understand: "A satisfactory explanation of the cause of the formation of crystals is yet to be made." Matte glazes had a soft, velvety surface that the catalogs compared to foliage, fruit skin, and melon rind. A further class, Wistaria [sic], was unique to Fulper: "the wistaria class are glazes with a pastelle texture, colors ranging through all wistaria shades."

==== Glaze examples ====
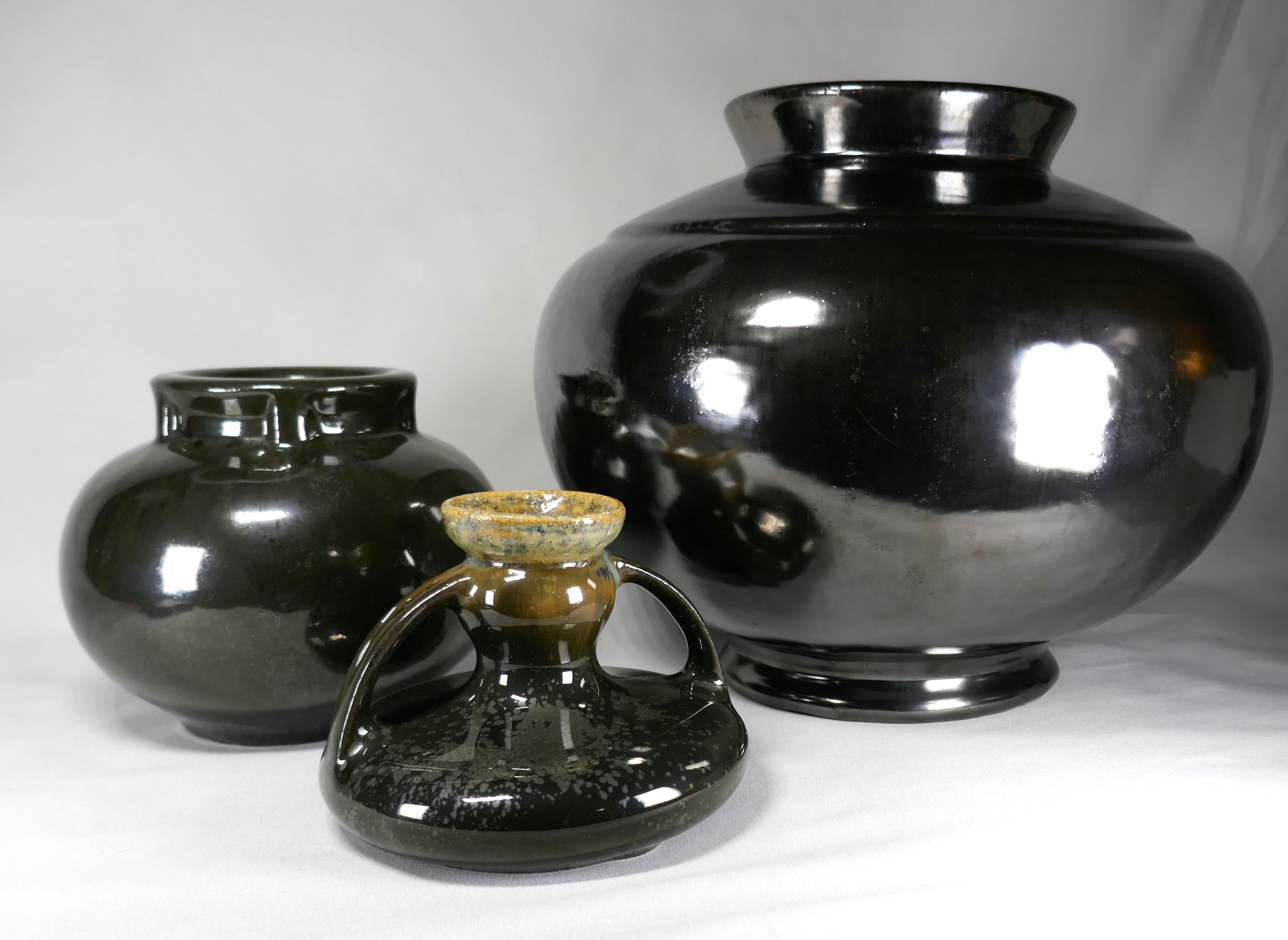
Two pieces on the left showing variations of the Mirror Black glaze. The large piece on the right shows Gun Metal Black.

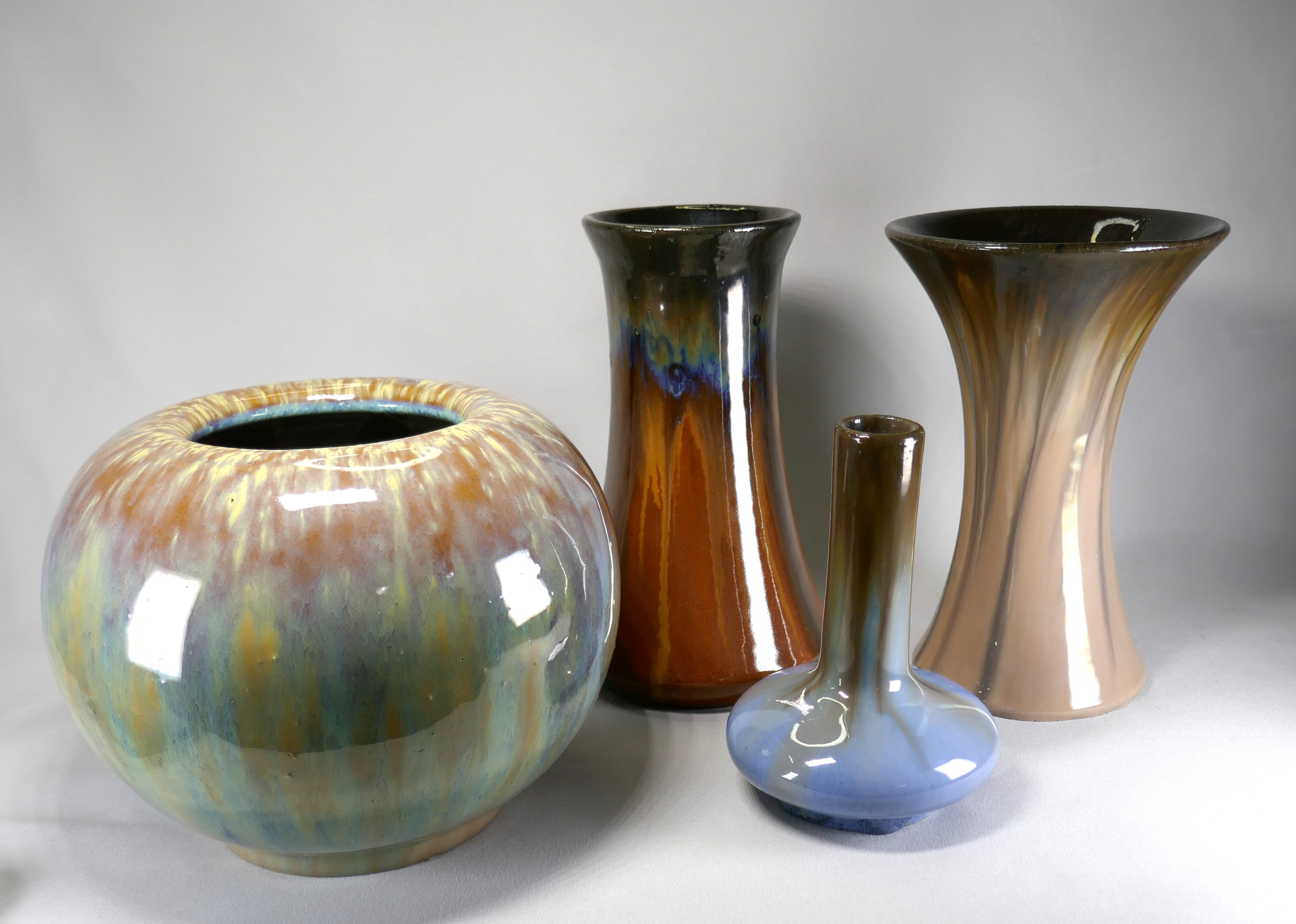
Group showing several variations of flambe glazes.

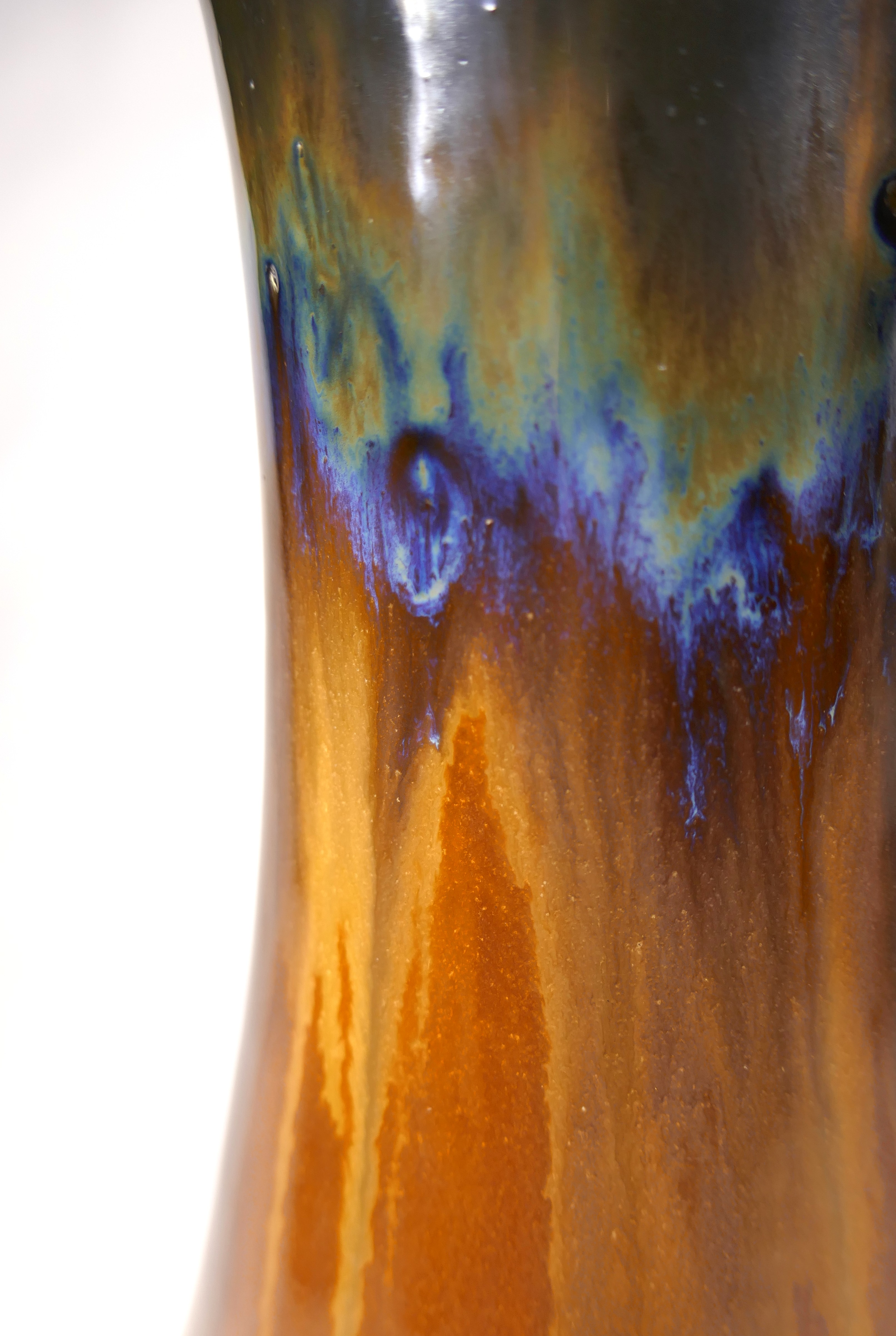
Detail of a flambe glaze.

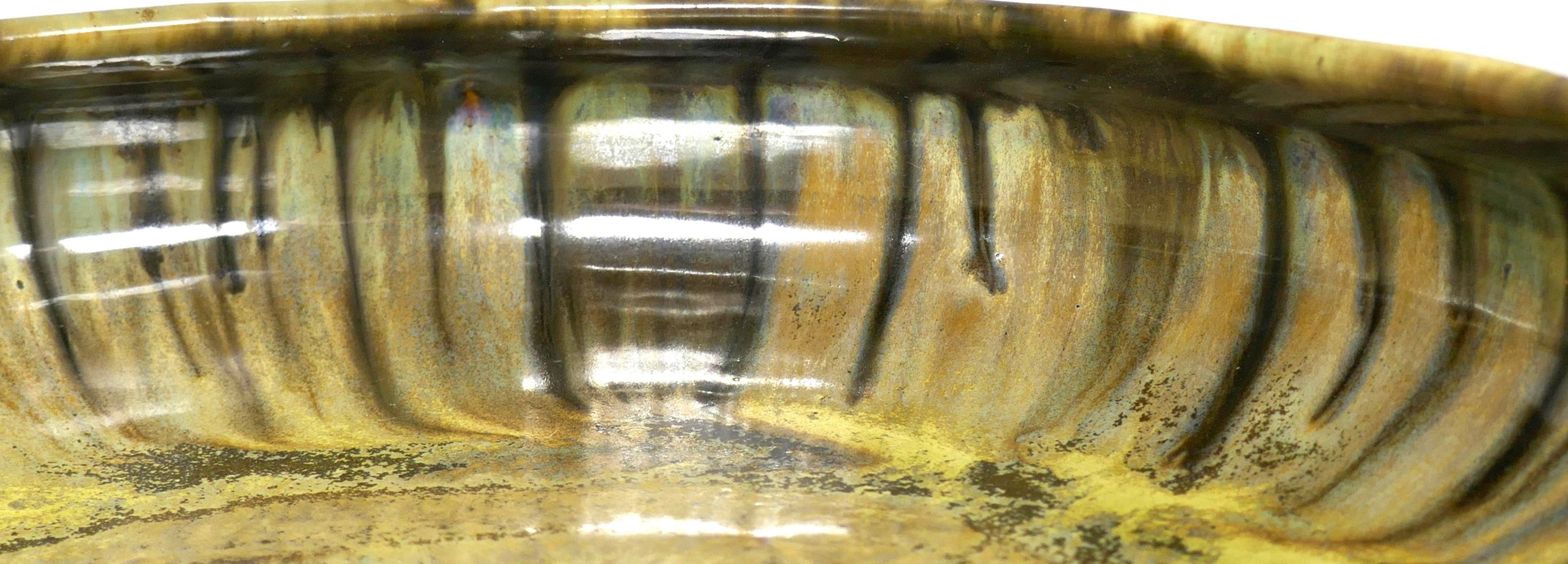
Fulper Pottery Company detail of a flambe glaze.

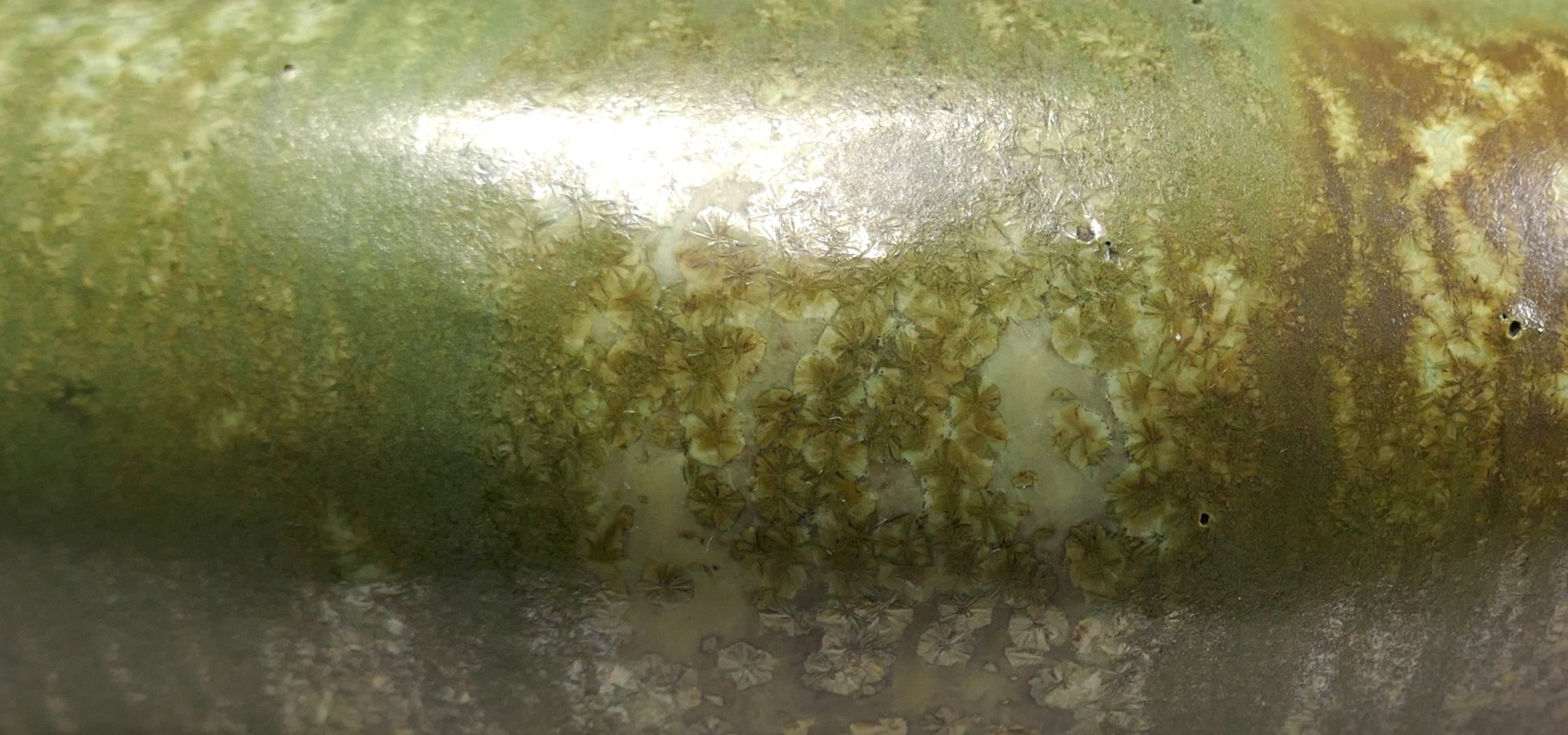
Fulper Pottery Company detail of the Cucumber Crystalline glaze.

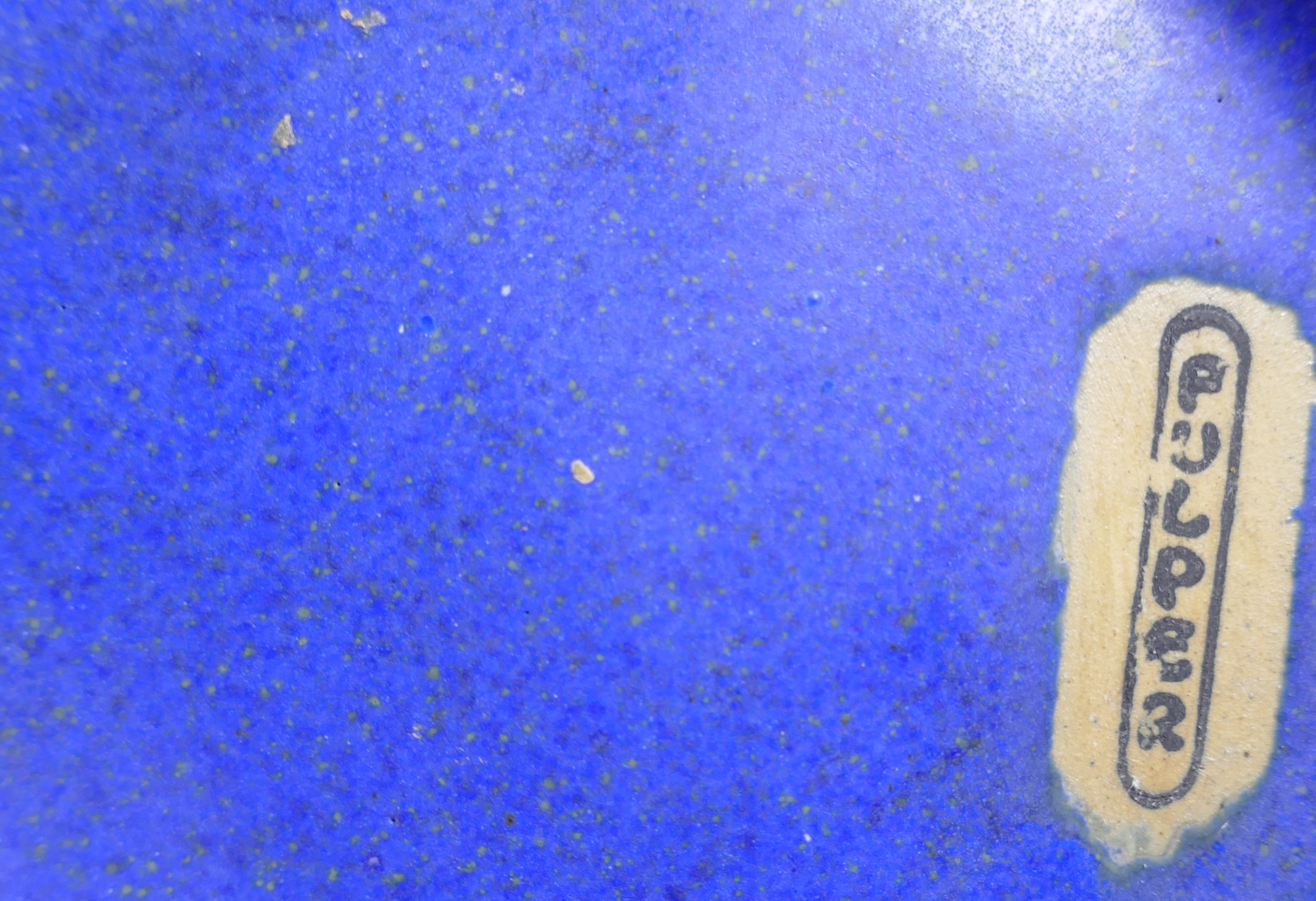
Detail of a dark matte blue glaze.

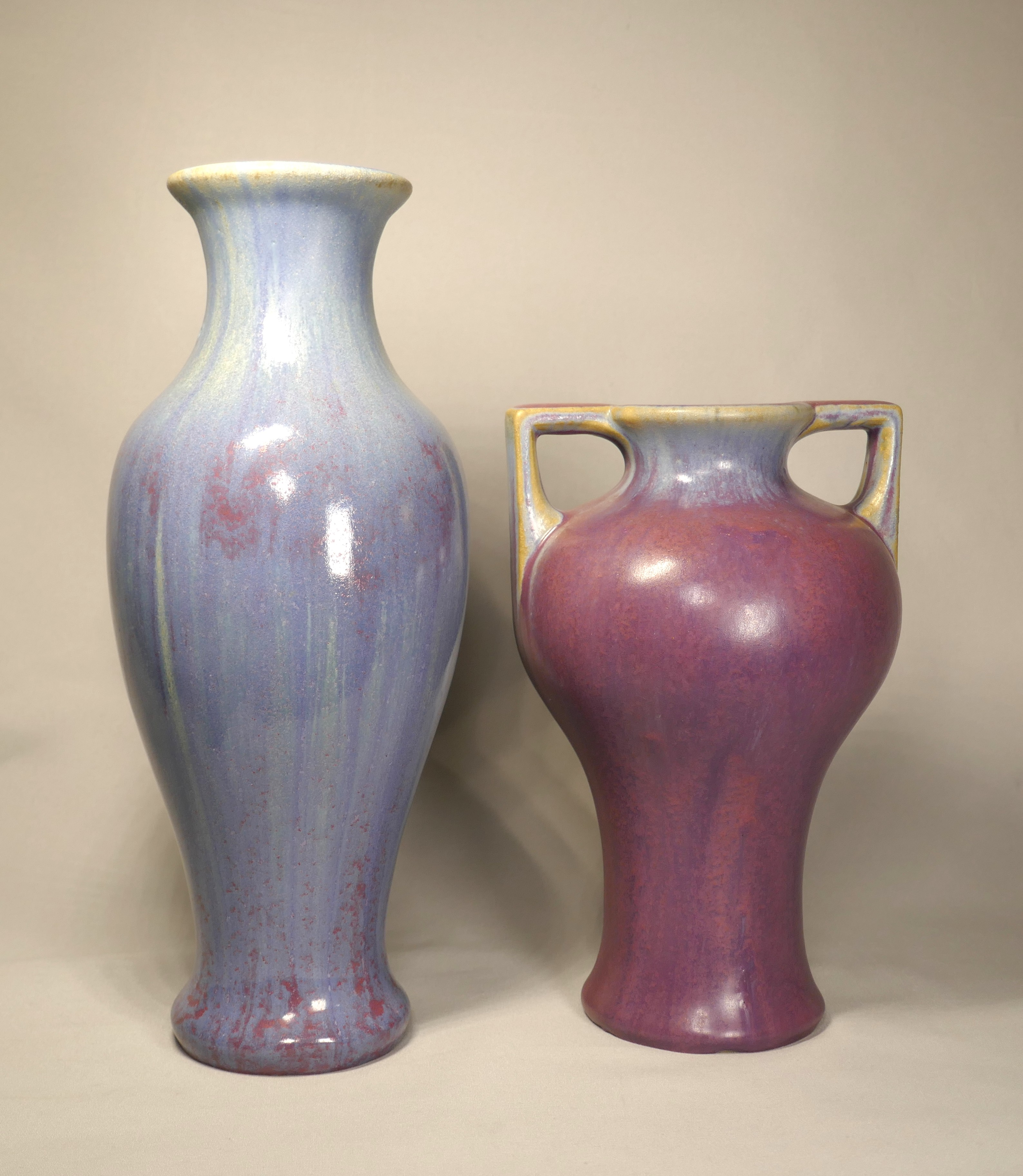
Vases showing two variations of the Wistaria glaze.

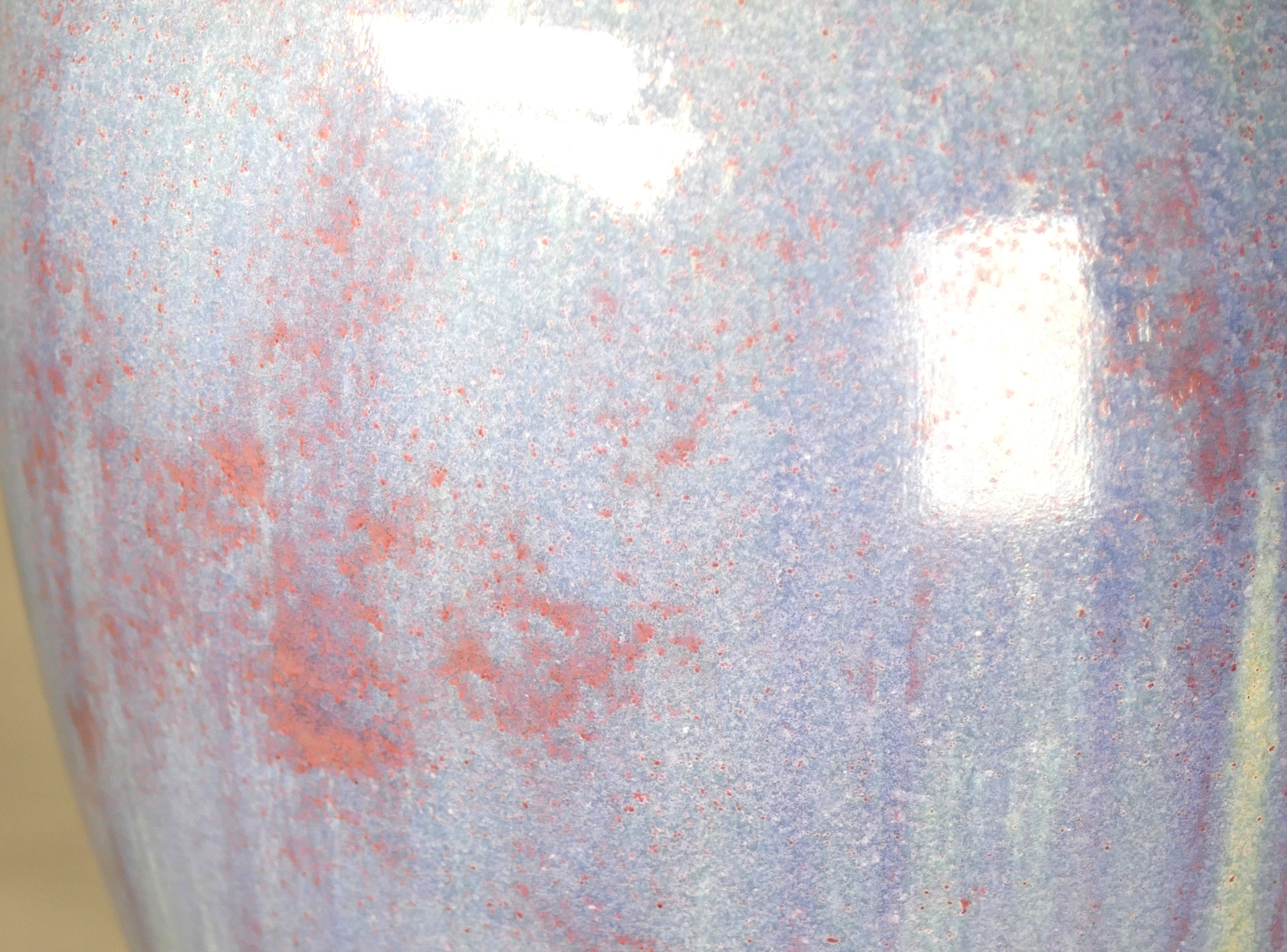
Detail of Wistaria Glaze.

=== Special product lines ===
==== Lamps ====
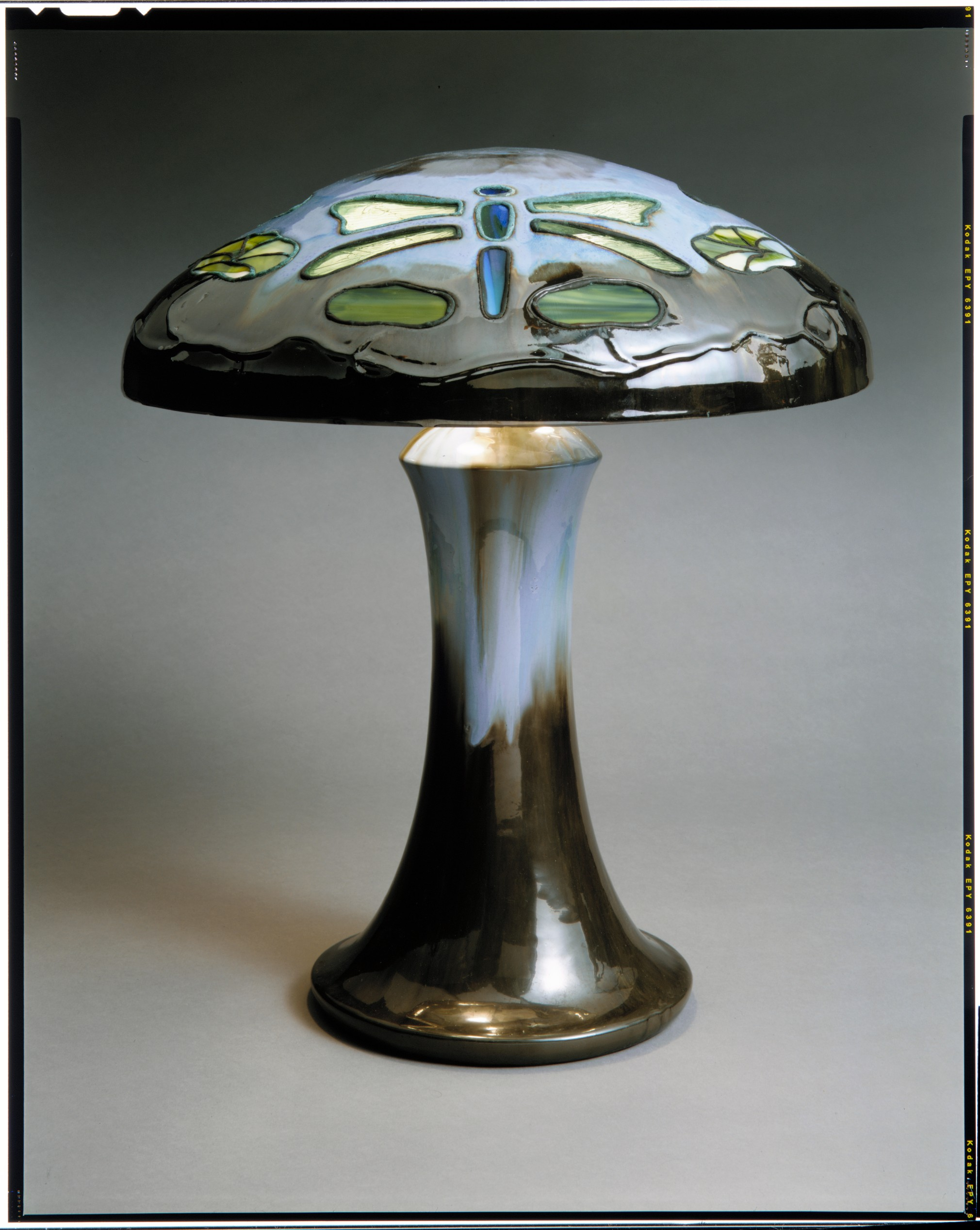
Table lamp with a pottery base and shade inset with colored glass, c. 1910–1915; one of only two known examples of this design. The lamp descended in the family of William H. Fulper II. Metropolitan Museum of Art (1998.448a, b).

Fulper began creating Vasekraft lamps with the help of German ceramic engineer J. Martin Stangl. After refining a set of rough 1910 prototypes, Fulper debuted the lamps in March 1911 at New York's Hotel Collingwood, followed by a five-month national exhibition tour. Period critics praised the lamps for pairing pottery shades with pottery bases, a design Fulper patented in the United States, Canada, and Great Britain. Fulper promoted the lamps through trade journals, popular magazines, catalogs, and exhibitions, including the 1915 Panama–Pacific International Exposition, where its Vasekraft display won the Medal of Honor.

The lamps came in two sizes: at least 36 named large models with two sockets, and at least 20 numbered small models with one socket. Designs drew on Asian forms, simple "conventional" and geometric shapes, and organic motifs. Several ornate period-style models were published in 1914, but no examples are known and they may never have been produced. Bases and shades were typically finished in a matching glaze, and shades were inset with translucent art glass in patterns of up to 64 pieces, among them rare dragonfly and touring-car designs. From 1911 to 1914 the lamps were the principal products of the Vasekraft line, but in the second half of 1914 Fulper shifted toward less expensive wares, possibly in response to a recession. The 1916 catalog listed only 14 lamp models, and production ended around 1918–1919.

==== First Fifteen ====
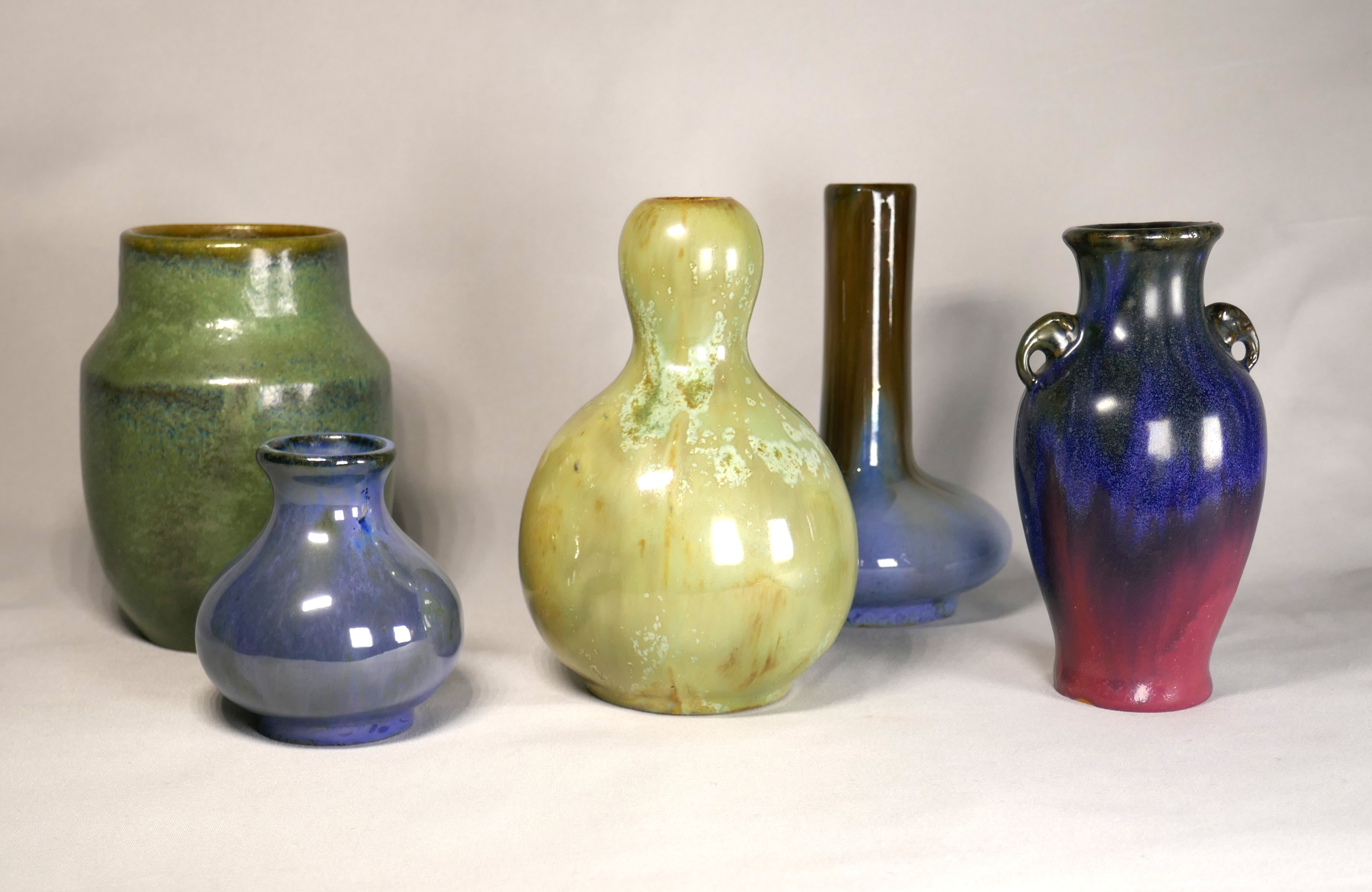
Fulper Vasekraft grouping of First Fifteen vases. Left to right: No. 13 (Prang Mark), No. 2 (Squat Rectangular Mark), No. 15 (Rect. Ink Mark), No. 4 (Rect. Ink Mark), 5 (Squat Letter and Symbol Mark).

The First Fifteen is a set of small Vasekraft cabinet vases that Fulper introduced in 1910–1911 and illustrated as a group in its 1912 and 1914 catalogs. Collectors named the set after its model numbers (1 through 15), which Fulper appears to have assigned somewhat arbitrarily to forms already in production, so the First Fifteen were not necessarily the company's first fifteen designs. Many of the forms appear to be modeled on old Chinese pottery. The Animal, Flat Oviform, and Amphora vases resemble shapes from the Kangxi-period peach bloom set, and others resemble an octagonal Qianlong vase, hexagonal Southern Song vases, a Western Han bottle, and Qing snuff bottles. Others have Chinese design elements such as a gourd-shaped body or elephant-head handles. Each model was typically offered in two standard glazes, though many were also made in alternative glazes from Fulper's mirrored, flambé, lustre, crystal, and matte classes. Fulper's unusual glaze names have often led to misidentification. Yellow and Brown Flambé are frequently mislabeled as Cat's Eye, which is actually a taupe glaze, and Green Flambé is commonly called "Flemington Green," a name absent from Fulper's own catalogs.

The full set was apparently made until at least 1914, although the scarcity of some models suggests earlier discontinuation. From 1916 only three forms (Nos. 4, 11, and 13) remained in the catalogs, renumbered 018, 016, and 017. These were sold in gift boxes during 1916–1917 and produced until 1923, and they are the most common First Fifteen forms found today. Pieces from 1910–1917 usually carry the Squat Rectangular ink mark, the Rectangular mark, a Vasekraft paper label, or, on Nos. 12 and 13, the Prang mark. The three later forms may bear the Oval ink mark or the Fulper paper label. Because most models are now scarce, collecting a complete set usually takes years.

==== Gift Boxes ====
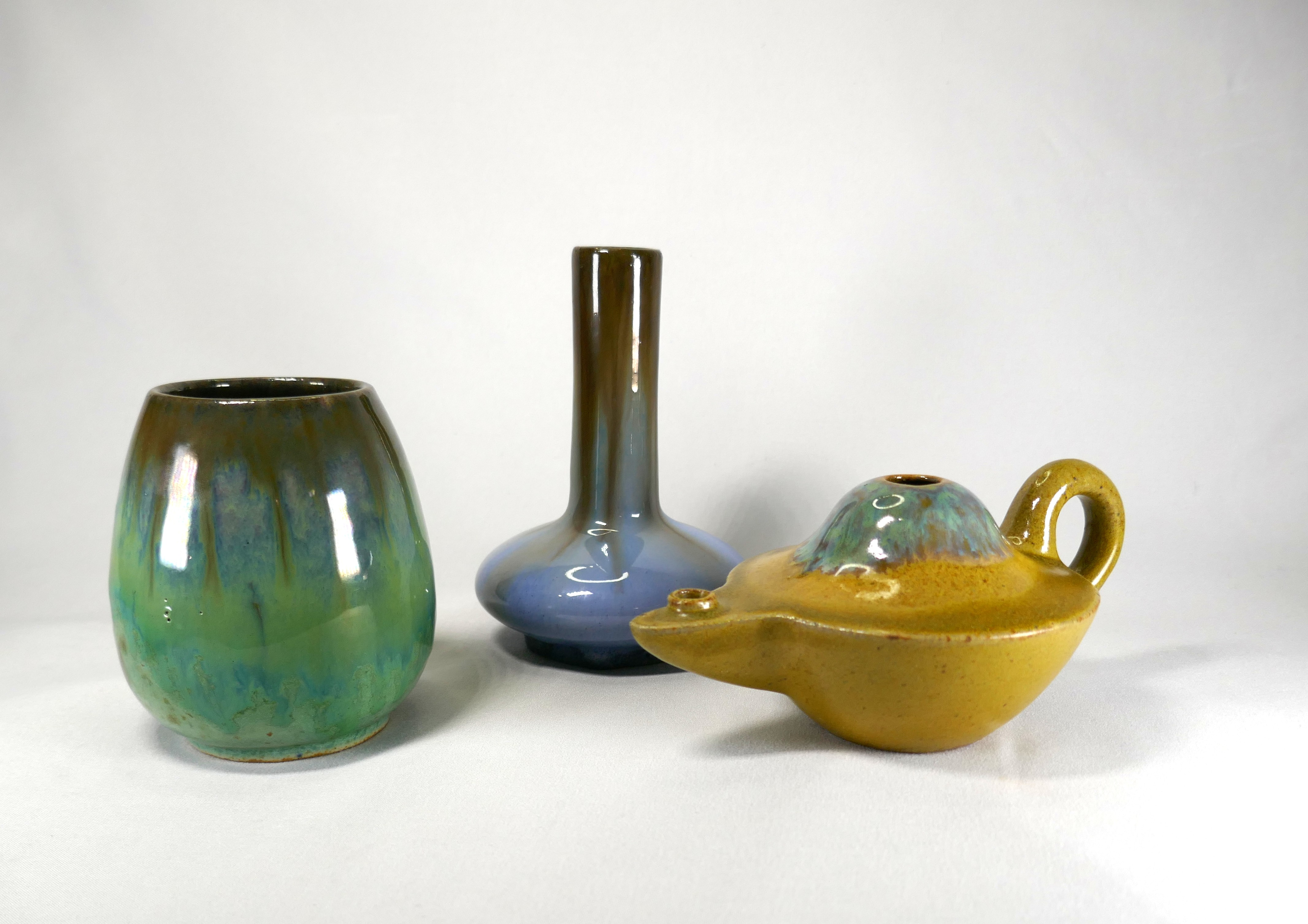
Fulper Vasekraft Gift Box items including (left to right) No. 011, a "First Fifteen Form" (No. 4/018), and a scarce No. 044 "Roman Lamp".

In 1915 Fulper introduced its "Gift Box" pottery, marketed as "Gift Thoughts in Texted Boxes". The line comprised fifty-four products (model Nos. 01 to 054), each packaged in a colorful box printed with an image of the contents and a short verse suited to the piece. Some boxes held only flower bulbs or Rockingham-glazed dinnerware, so only thirty-nine Vasekraft art pottery forms appeared in the series. These included vases, bowls, flower holders, coasters, candleholders, ashtrays, potpourri containers, and bulb jars, along with novelties such as a beehive honeypot, a barrel-shaped child's bank, a cocktail mixer, an incense burner, a Roman lamp, and sets of place card vases. Some boxes also included bulbs, potpourri, or bayberry candles. Most items sold for $0.75 to $1.50, far below the prices of Fulper's standard Vasekraft bowls, vases, bookends, and lamps.

The concept may have drawn on the Rust Craft Shop, which began selling decorated gift boxes of flower bulbs in 1914, and on a May 1915 trade show where Fulper shared space with a candle company displaying boxed bayberry candles. Many forms debuted during the 1915 Christmas season, and the 1916 catalog showed 42 of the 54 items. The boxes were likely discontinued in 1917, though many of the forms remained in production into the early 1920s, most of them keeping their "0"-prefixed model numbers. Original boxes are rare today, as are a few short-lived forms.

=== Marks ===
Because many company records were destroyed in the 1929 fire that damaged Fulper's principal works, marks applied to surviving pottery have become an important source for dating and identifying individual pieces. Fulper employed a succession of ink stamps, impressed marks, molded logos, paper labels, and foil labels during its art pottery period, and the evolution of these marks has been the subject of specialized study. Earlier accounts of Fulper's marks, including those by Blasberg (1979) and Hibel, Hibel, and DeFalco (1992), assigned approximate dates to some marks, and many of those dates were revised in a 2017 analysis by Jon A. Kornacki, who reconstructed the chronology using period catalogs, advertisements, and journals, along with physical examination of surviving marks.

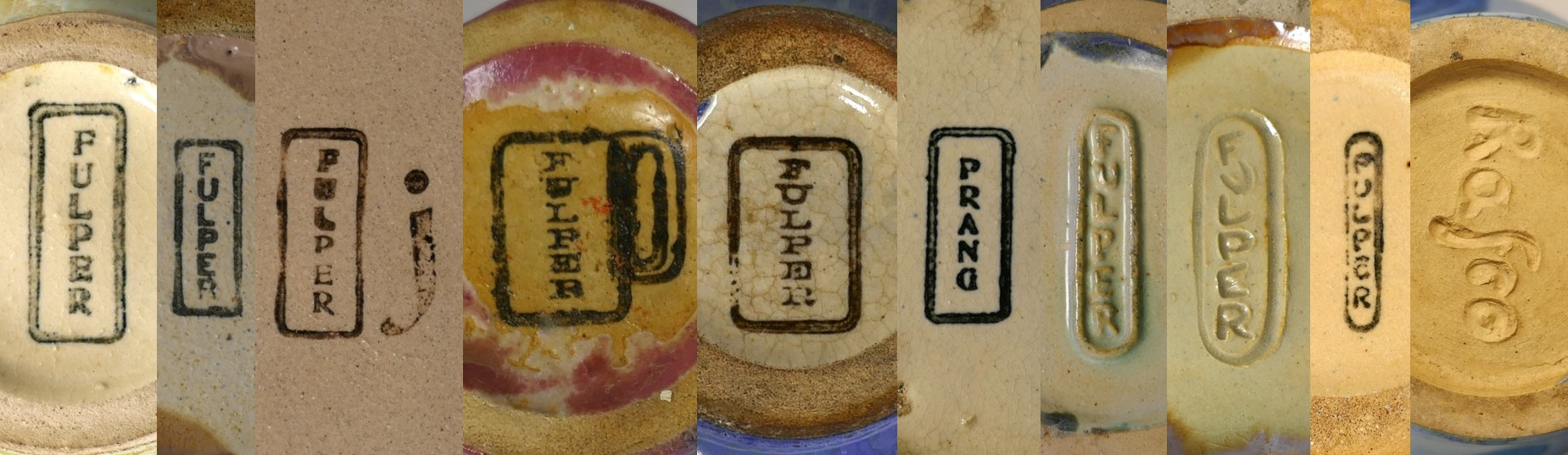
Selection of Fulper Backstamps in chronological order. Left to Right: Rectangular Ink Mark - two versions, Letter and Symbol Marks - two versions, Squat Rectangular Ink Mark, Prang Mark, Raised Oval Mark, Incised Oval Mark, Oval Ink Mark, Rafco Mark.

The earliest Vasekraft wares (c. 1909–1917) are most commonly associated with rectangular ink marks bearing the Fulper name. Several variations were used. During this period the company also employed the Vasekraft trademark, featuring the "Potter and His Wheel" emblem, particularly on lamps and selected specialty forms. Other early markings included private-label marks, such as those used for pottery marketed through the Prang Company.

In 1917 Fulper discontinued the Vasekraft trademark and adopted a new group of oval marks that remained in use throughout much of the company's later production. These included impressed, raised, and inked variants that appeared on different forms and product lines. The change was part of a wider rebranding. By early 1917 Fulper's advertisements had dropped the Vasekraft name and referred to the line simply as "Fulper Pottery," and the Fulper oval logo became its principal trademark. Kornacki suggests the Vasekraft name may have been abandoned because it looked and sounded German at a time when the United States was entering World War I.

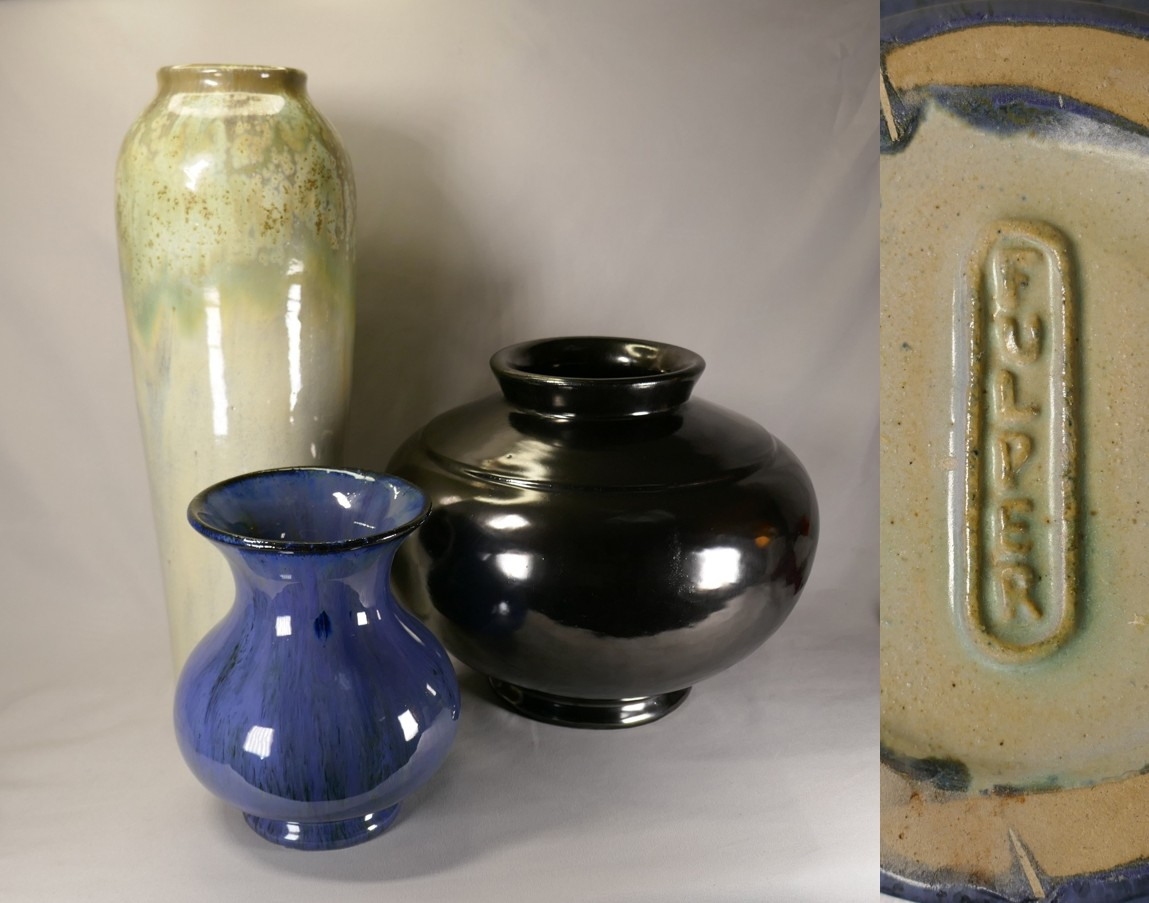
Group of vases, each with Oval Raised Mark. c.1917-1923 Tallest is 15.5"

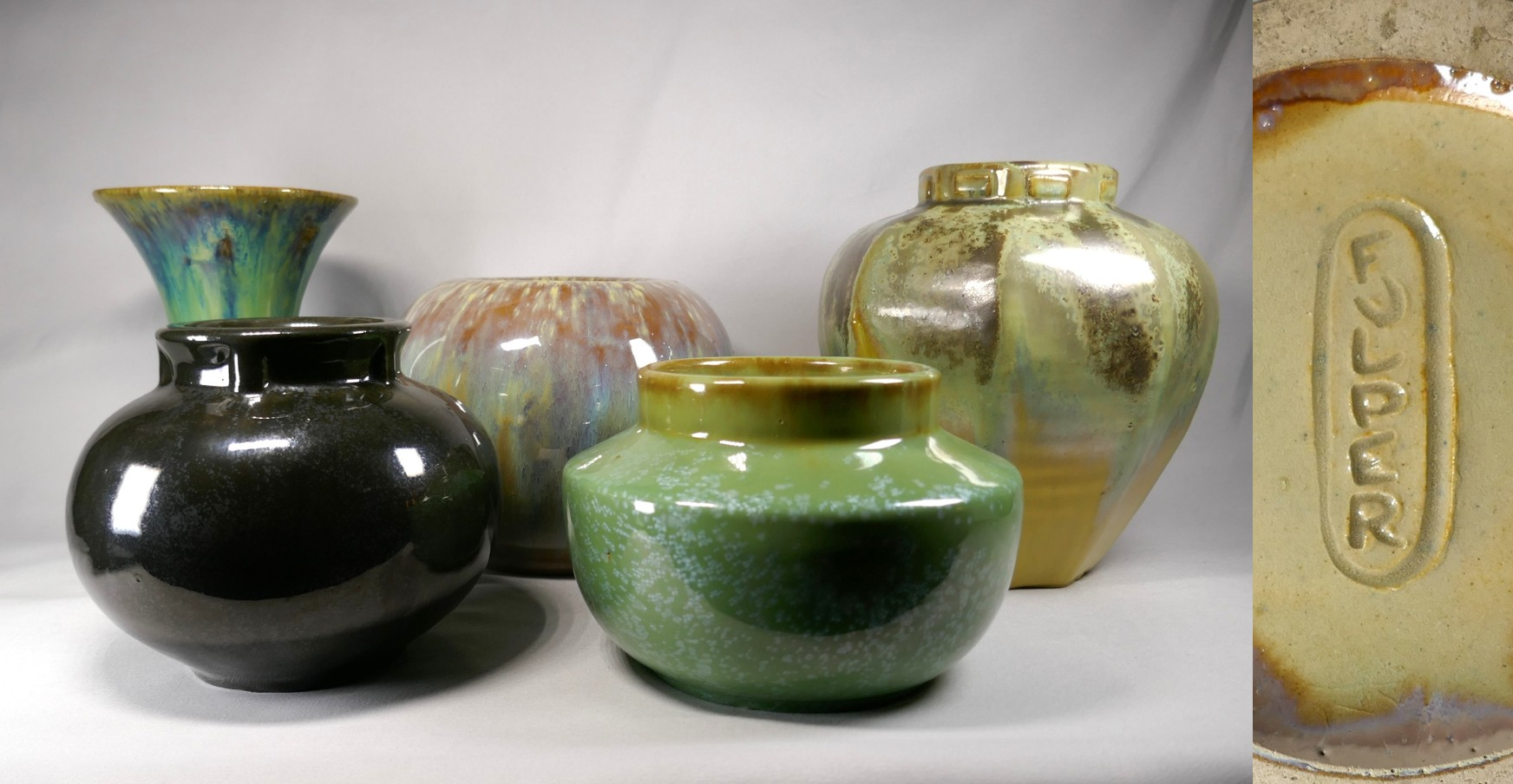
Group of vases, each with the Oval Incised Mark. c.1917-1927. Tallest is 8".

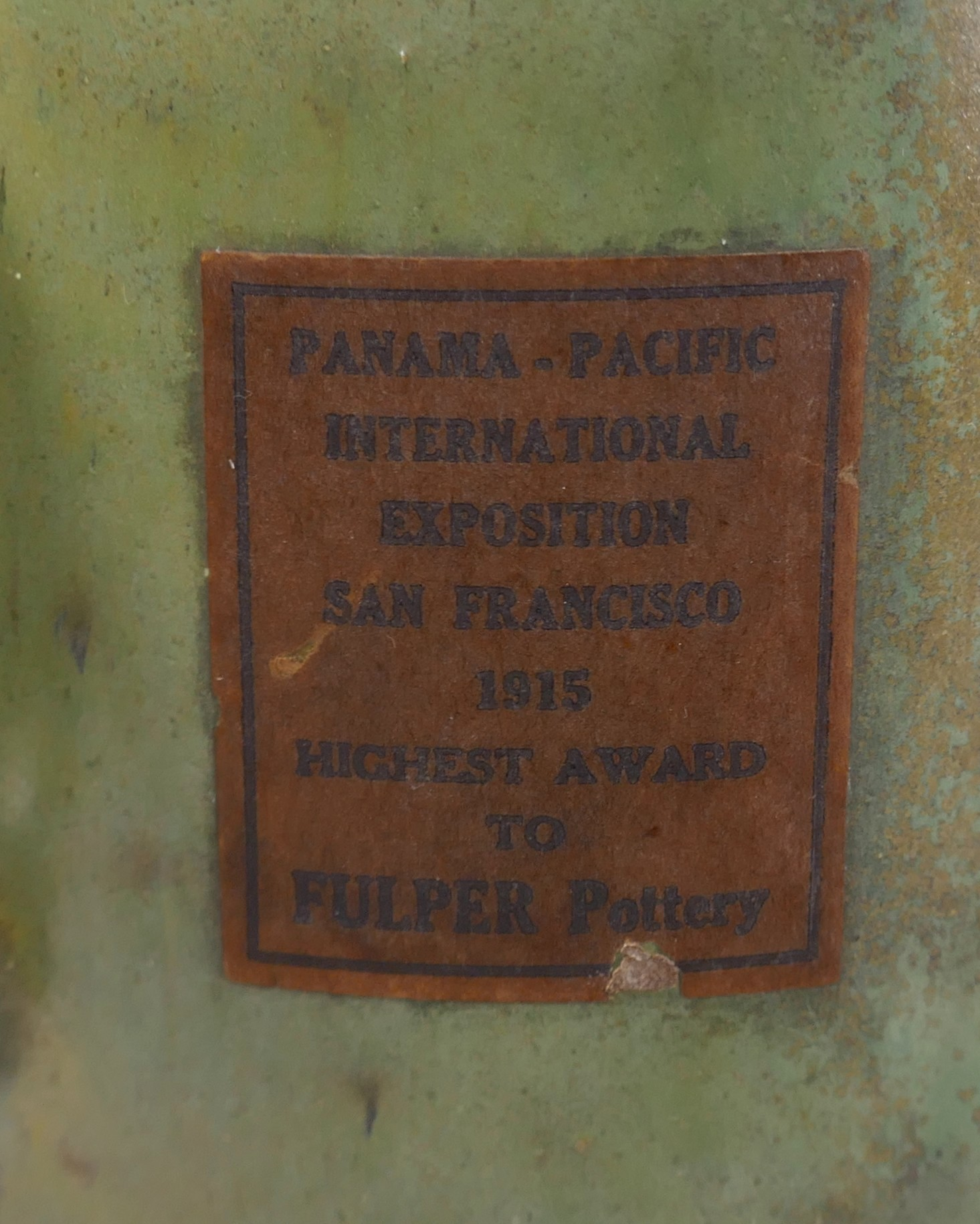
Panama Pacific Label

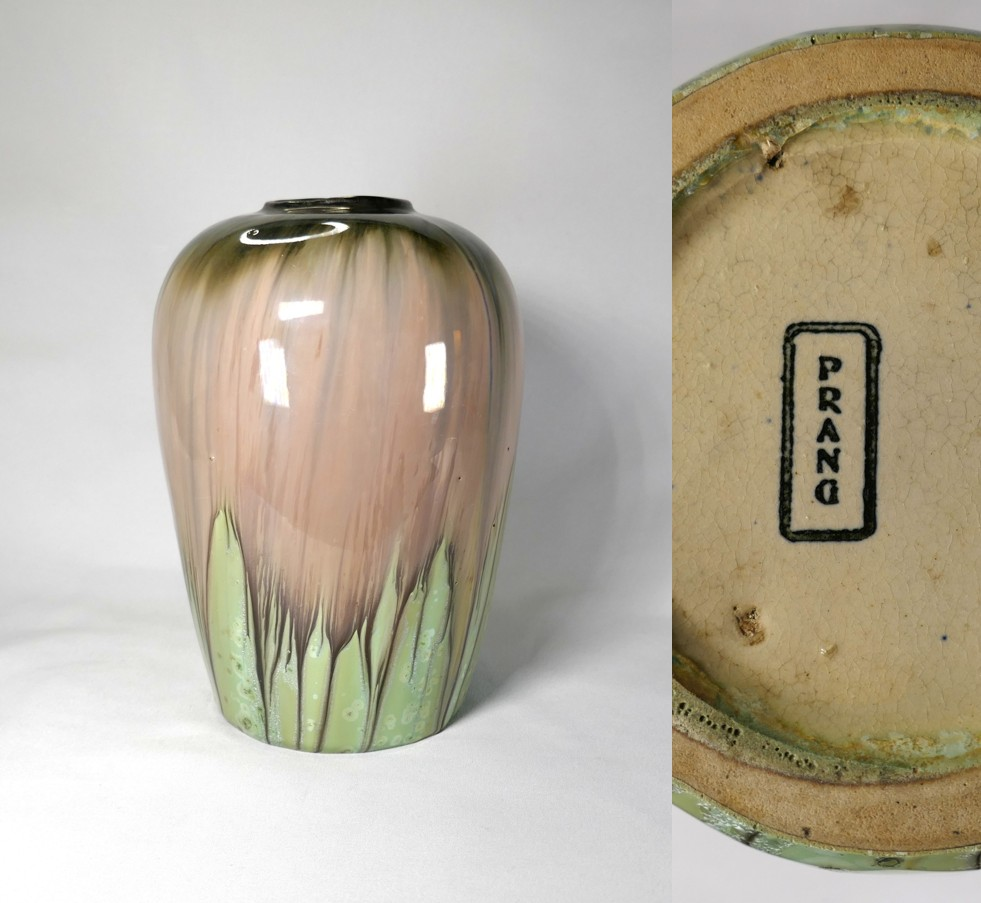
Fulper Vasekraft Prang Vase showing Backstamp

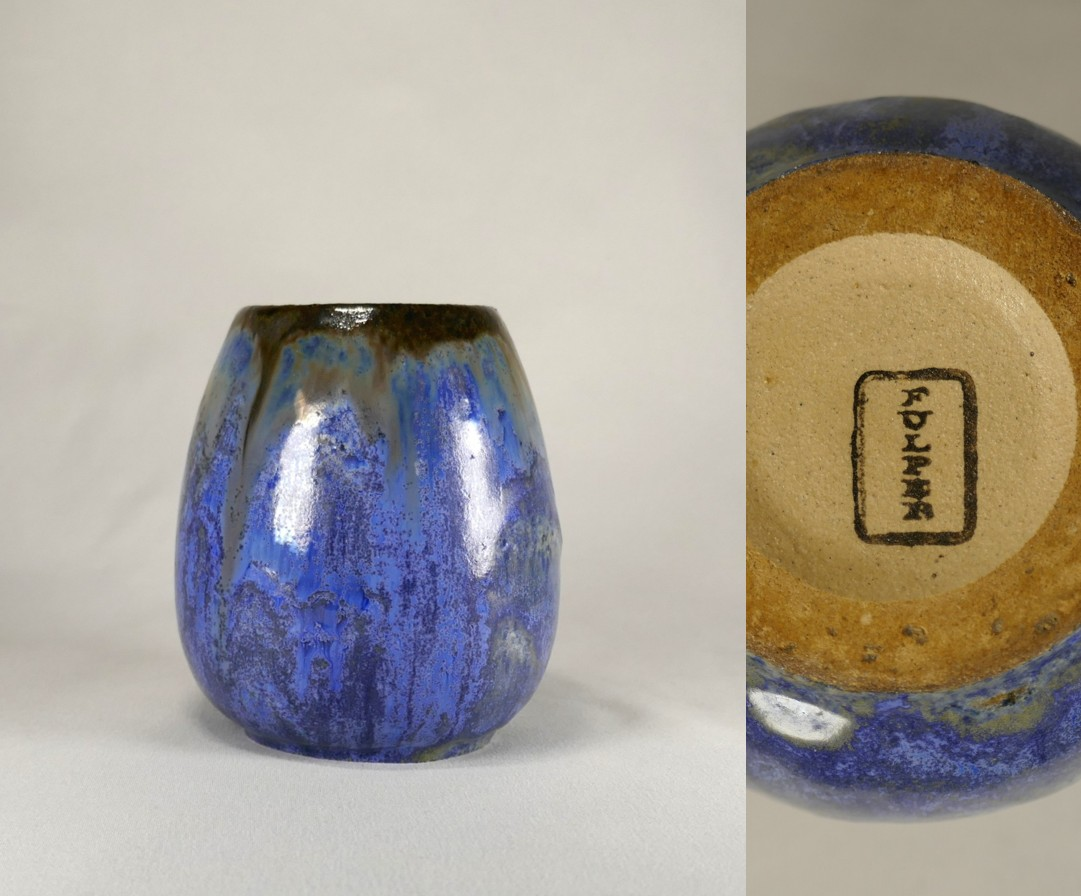
Fulper Vasekraft Shape Number 011 with a crystalline blue flambe glaze, showing Squat Rectangular Ink Mark, c. 1910-1916.

=== Transition to Stangl glazes and shapes ===
Beginning in 1924, under newly appointed vice president J. Martin Stangl, Fulper introduced new product lines, including Fulper Fayence, finished in solid-color glazes that were distinct from the mirrored, flambé, and crystalline glazes used on the company's art pottery. This new line was produced alongside Fulper's existing art pottery line. Stangl acquired the company in 1930, and the art pottery line continued in production for several more years before being discontinued in 1934, at which point production continued solely under the Stangl Pottery label. Solid-color dinnerware production continued and expanded under Stangl's direction, and by the 1940s the company had introduced hand-carved, hand-painted dinnerware patterns that became its best-known product line.

== Collecting and legacy ==
Fulper pottery is widely collected. The First Fifteen and other early forms, many discontinued after only a few years, are now especially scarce. At a February 2023 auction, a rare, gourd-shaped, crystalline-glazed vase dating to about 1910 sold for $20,160 against an estimate of $1,000–1,500.

Fulper's later work has also remained collectible. At a September 2023 auction, a Cattail vase dating to the period between 1917 and 1927, the example illustrated on the cover of The Fulper Book, sold for $22,680 against a pre-auction estimate of $5,000–7,000.

=== Museum collections ===
Major museums holding Fulper pottery include the Metropolitan Museum of Art, Smithsonian Institution, Los Angeles County Museum of Art, and the Art Institute of Chicago.

In 2018, the Metropolitan Museum of Art accessioned a major group of American art pottery from the collection of Robert A. Ellison Jr., which the museum's catalog describes as "one of the most important and comprehensive collections of its kind." The gift included several Fulper works, among them a likely unique stoneware ewer (Met 2018.294.92). The Met's accompanying publication, American Art Pottery: The Robert A. Ellison Jr. Collection (2018), features a dedicated chapter titled "Fulper: An Art Pottery Manufactory".

== Gallery ==
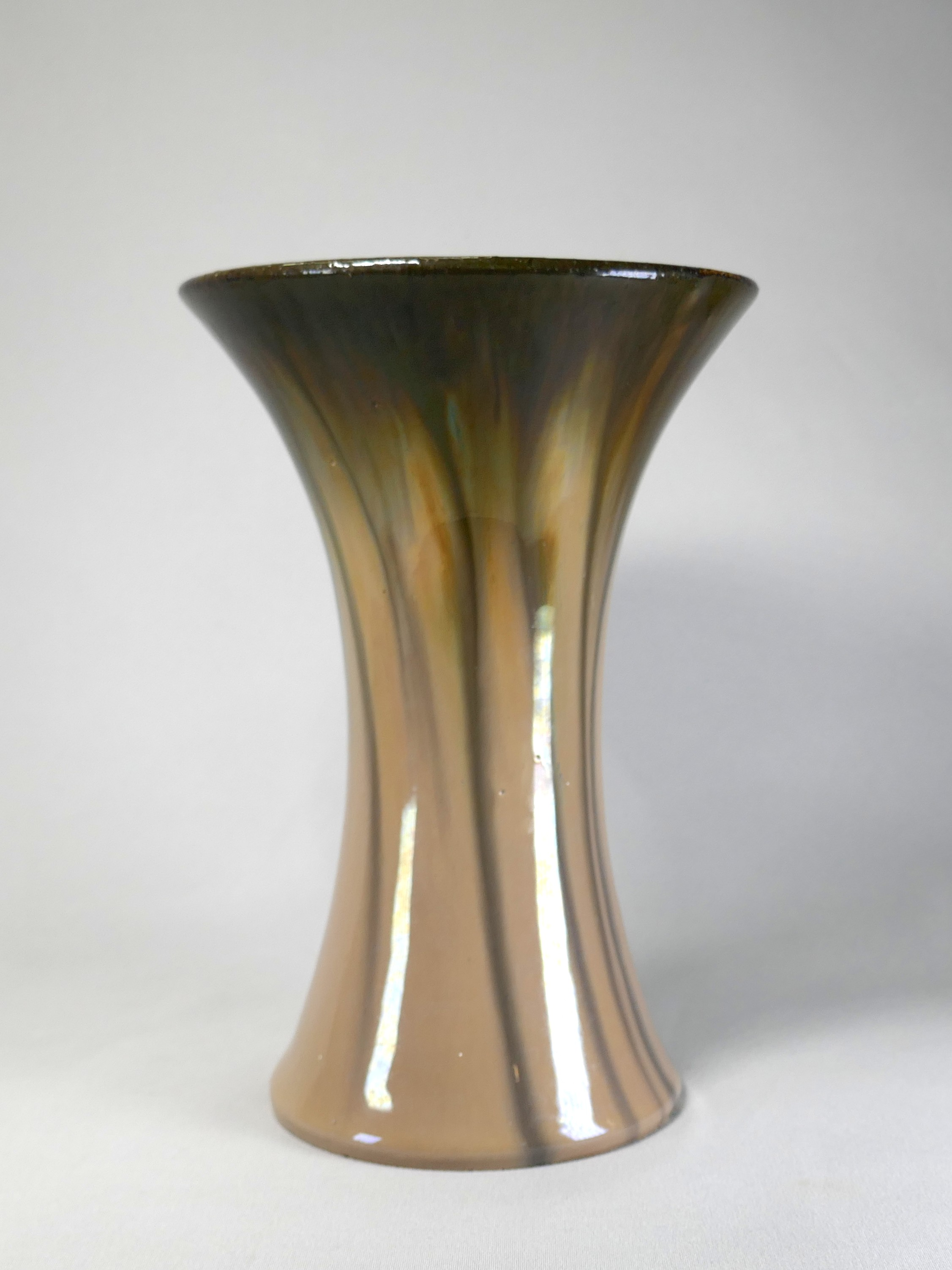
Fulper Vasekraft Number 26, "The Fool's Cap", with a flambe glaze, Rectangular Ink Mark. c. 1909-1917.

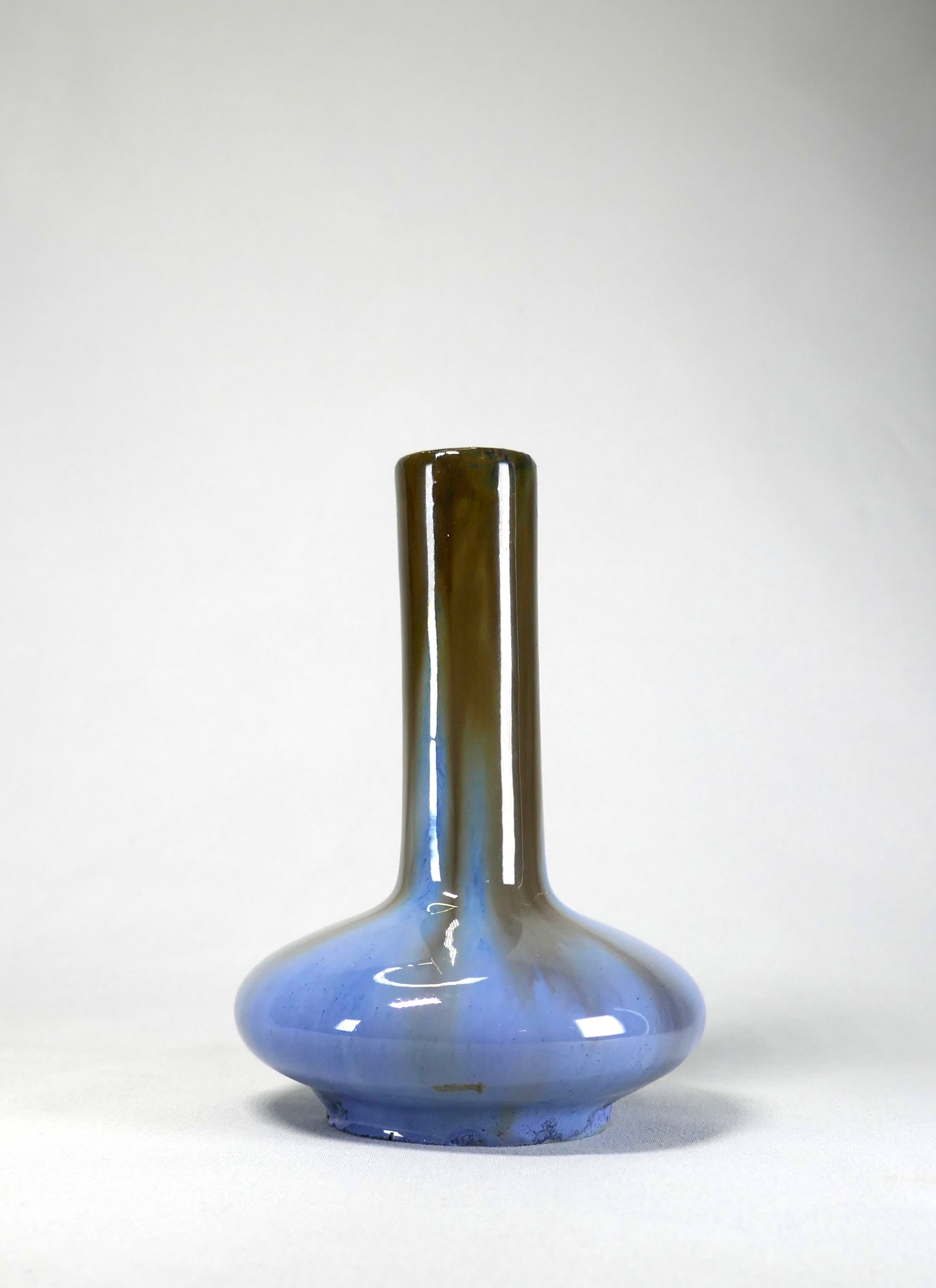
Fulper Vasekraft Shape No. 4 (Gift Box shape 018)

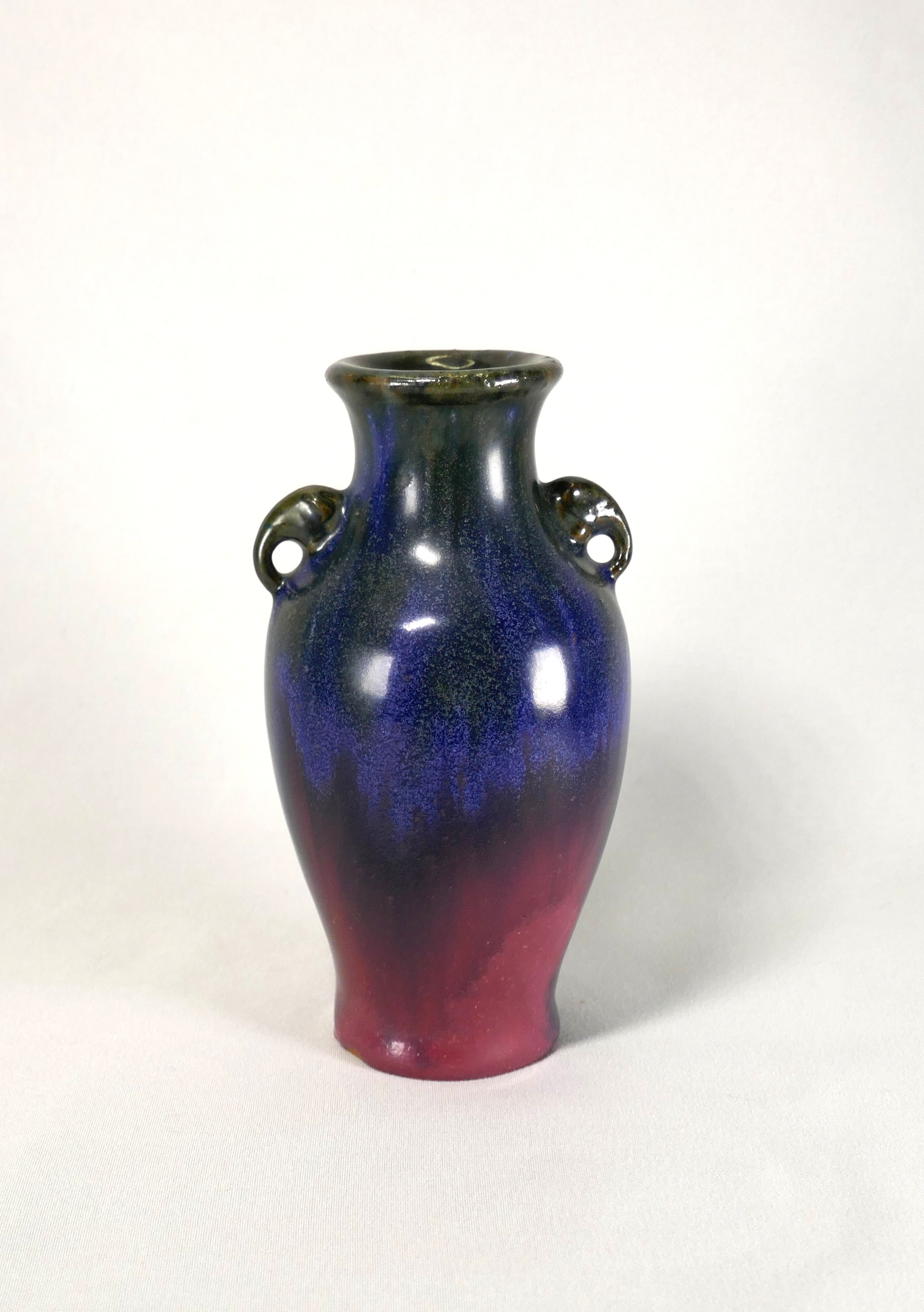
Fulper Vasekraft Shape No. 5

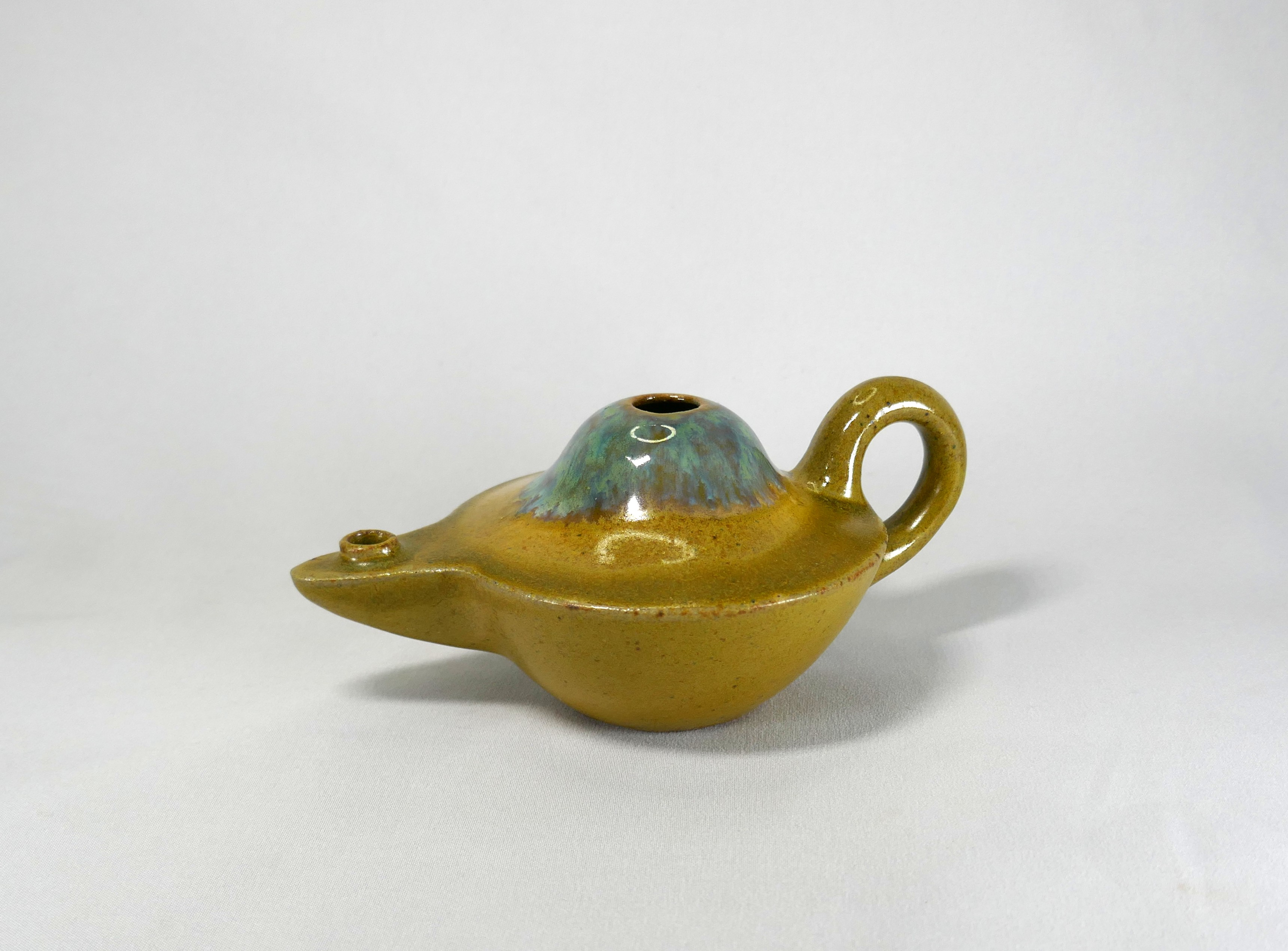
Fulper Vasekraft Shape No. 044 "Roman Lamp"

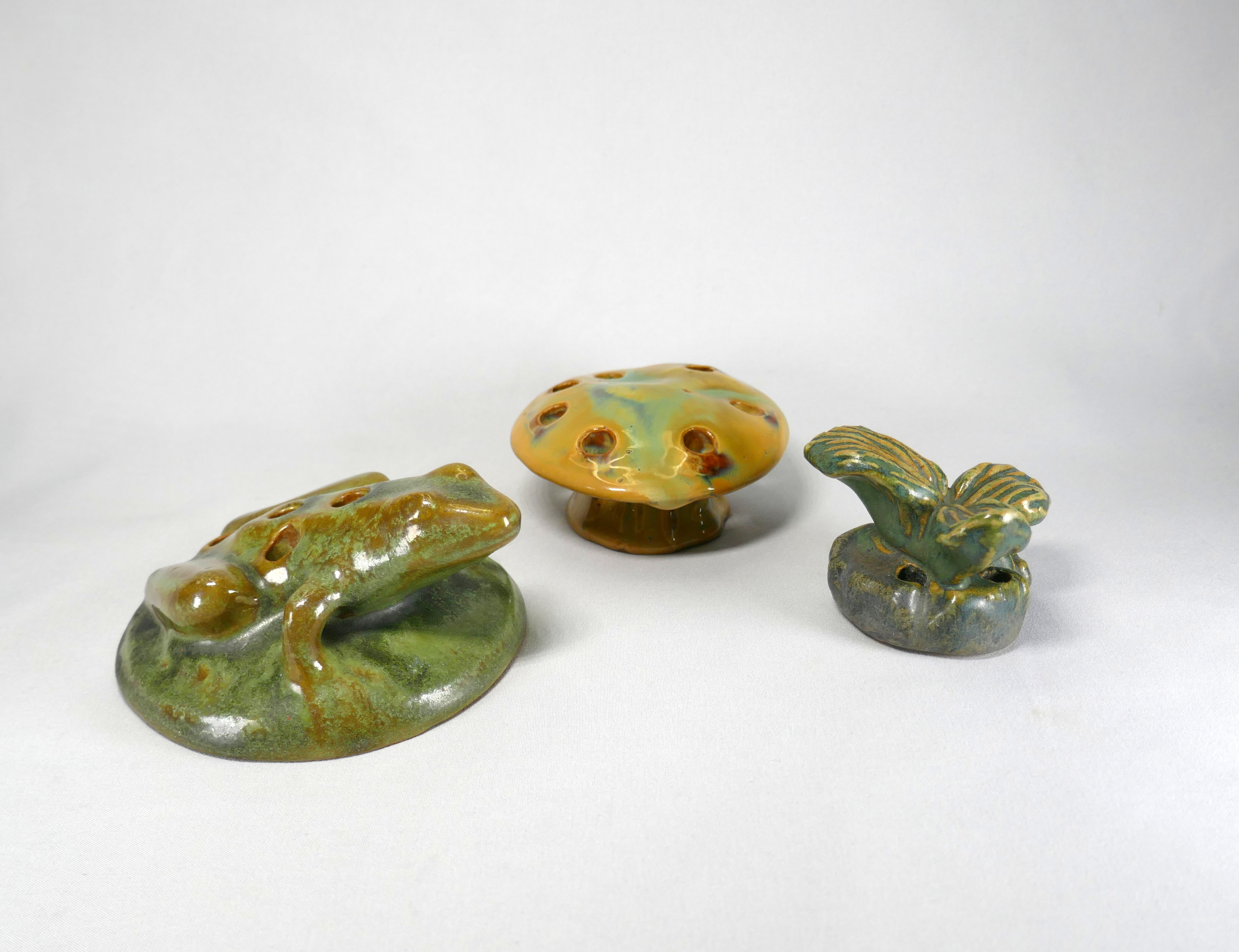
Fulper Pottery Collection of Flower Frogs

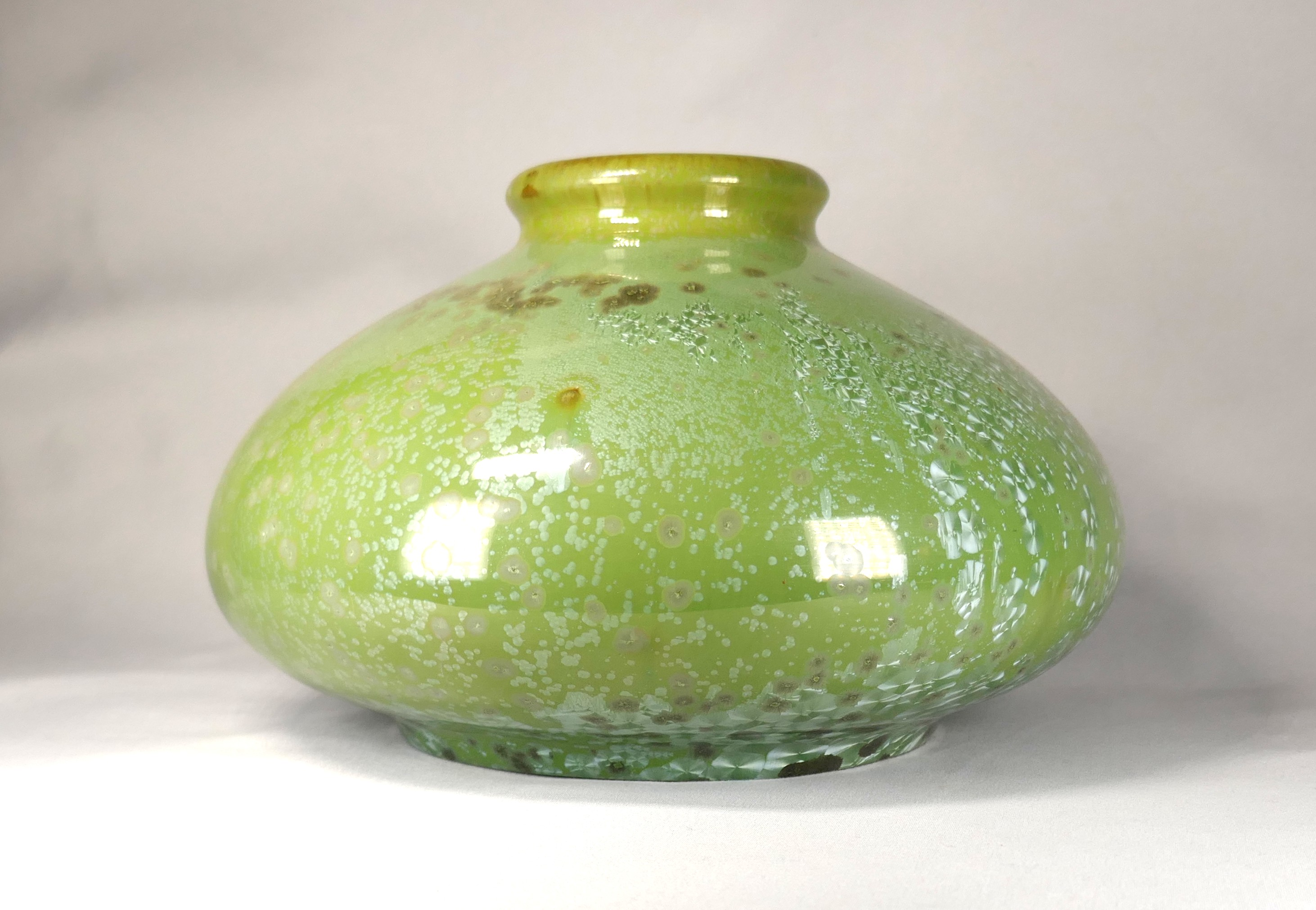
Fulper Pottery Shape Number 657. Oval Inkstamp.

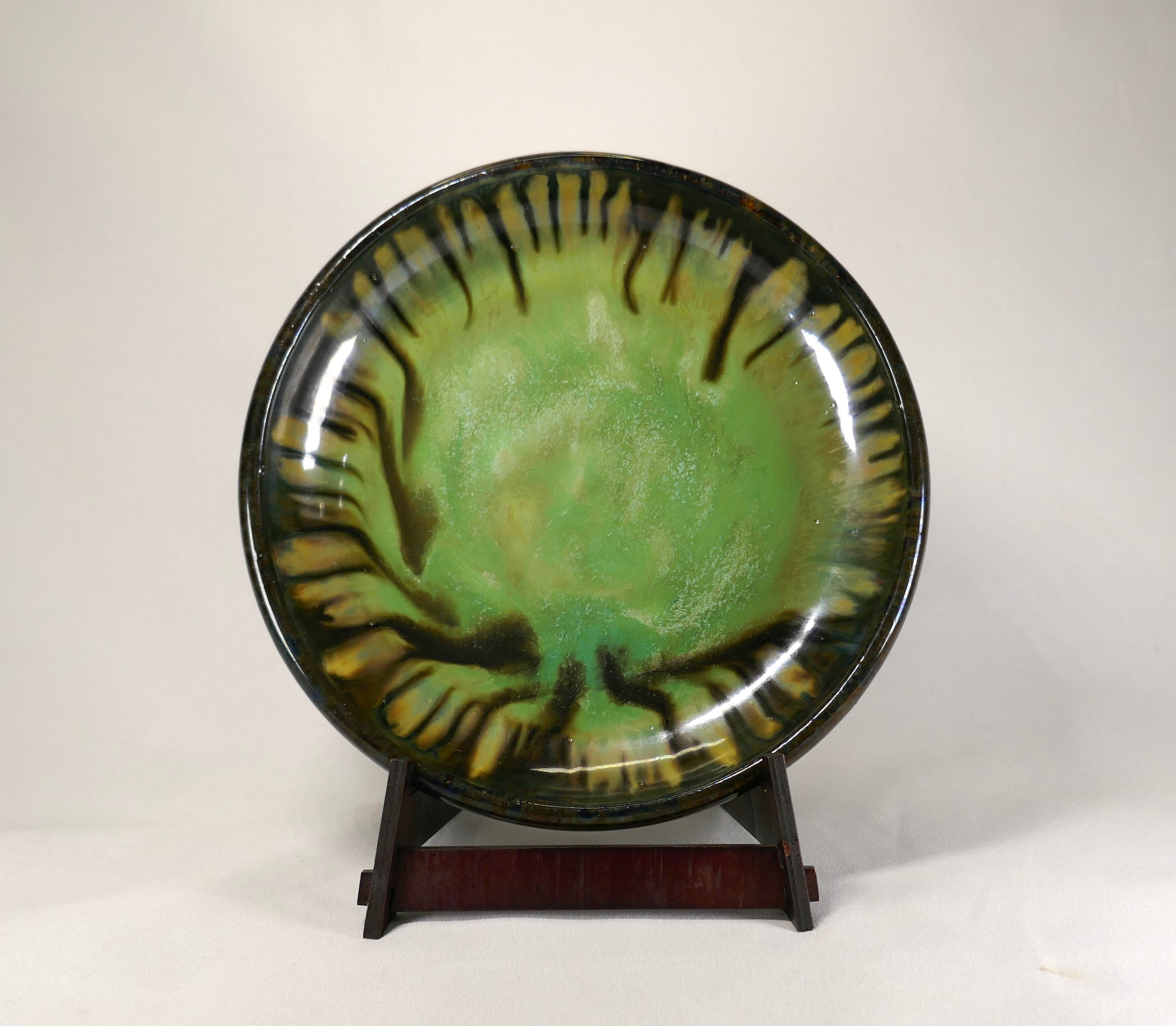
Fulper Vasekraft Bowl, Shape Number 422 with Flemington Green flambe glaze. Rectangular Inkstamp.

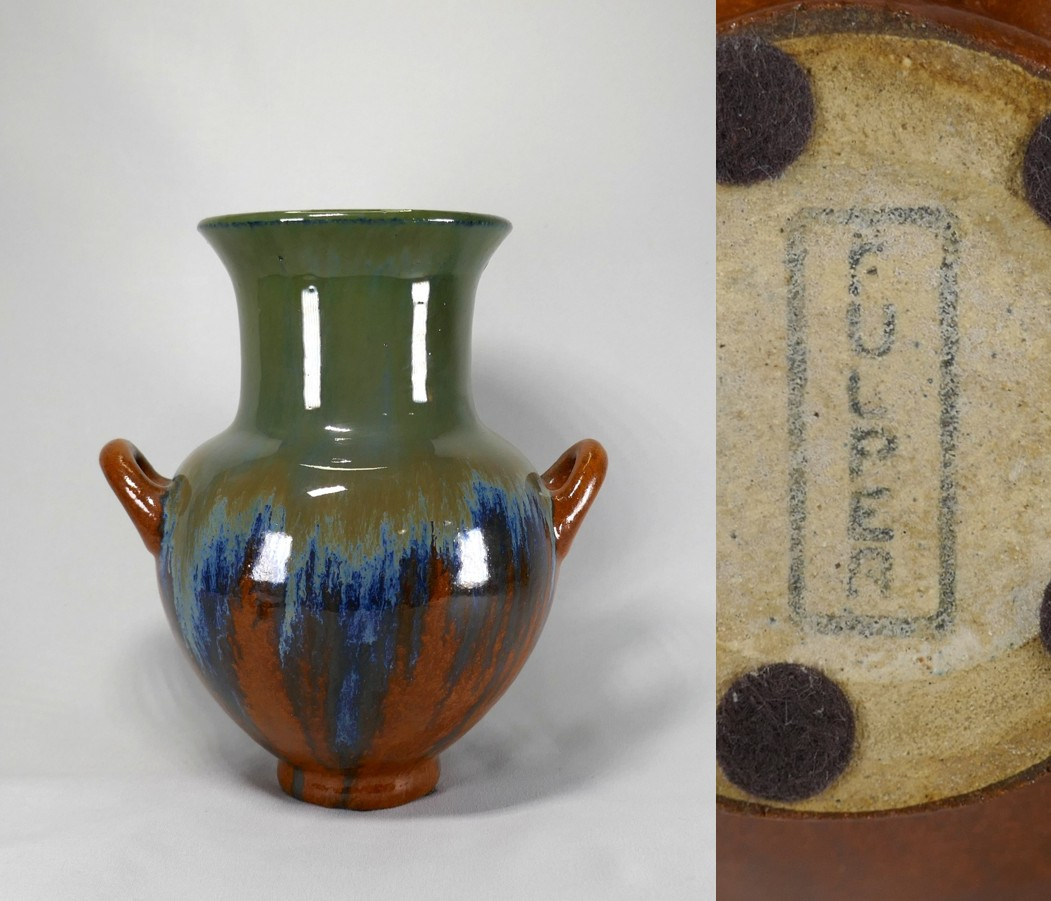
Fulper Vasekraft Shape No. 489 showing Rectangular Inkstamp.

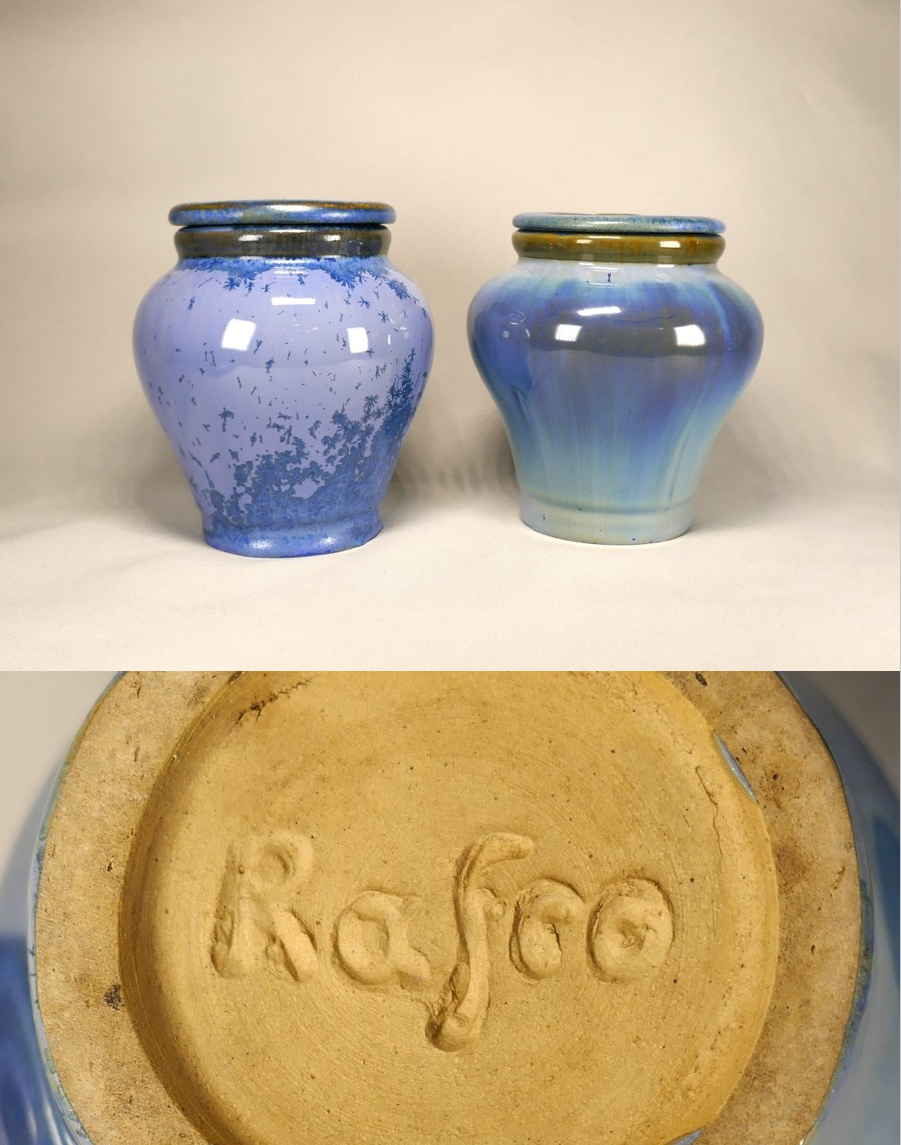
Fulper Pottery Rafco Covered Jars with blue crystalline, and blue and cream flambe glazes RAFCO mark c.1920.

== Bibliography ==
- Kornacki, Jon A. (2017). "Fulper's Marking System" (PDF). Journal of the American Art Pottery Association. 33 (1): 6–15.
- Kornacki, Jon A. (2013). "Fulper's First Fifteen" (PDF). Journal of the American Art Pottery Association. 29 (2): 14–21.
- Kornacki, Jon A. (2019). "Fulper's Gift Box Pottery" (PDF). Journal of the American Art Pottery Association. 35 (4): 4–8.
- Kornacki, Jon A. (2012). "Fulper's Vasekraft Lamps" (PDF). Journal of the American Art Pottery Association. 28 (2): 8–15.
- Hibel, John; Hibel, Carole Goldman; DeFalco, Robert (1992). The Fulper Book. David Rago (text). Self-published.
- Blasberg, Robert (1979). Fulper Art Pottery: An Aesthetic Appreciation 1909–1929. Jordan Volpe Gallery. ISBN 9780942410006.
- Brussel, Michael; Chappell, Steffi (January 23, 2019). "Object of the Week: Handled Vase by Fulper Pottery Company". Everson Museum of Art.
- Frelinghuysen, Alice Cooney; Eidelberg, Martin; Spinozzi, Adrienne (2018). American Art Pottery: The Robert A. Ellison Jr. Collection. New York: The Metropolitan Museum of Art.
- Stuart, Evelyn Marie (October 1913). "Vasekraft—An American Art Pottery". Fine Arts Journal. 29 (4): 607–616.
