= Cobalt compounds =

Chemical compound containing the element cobalt

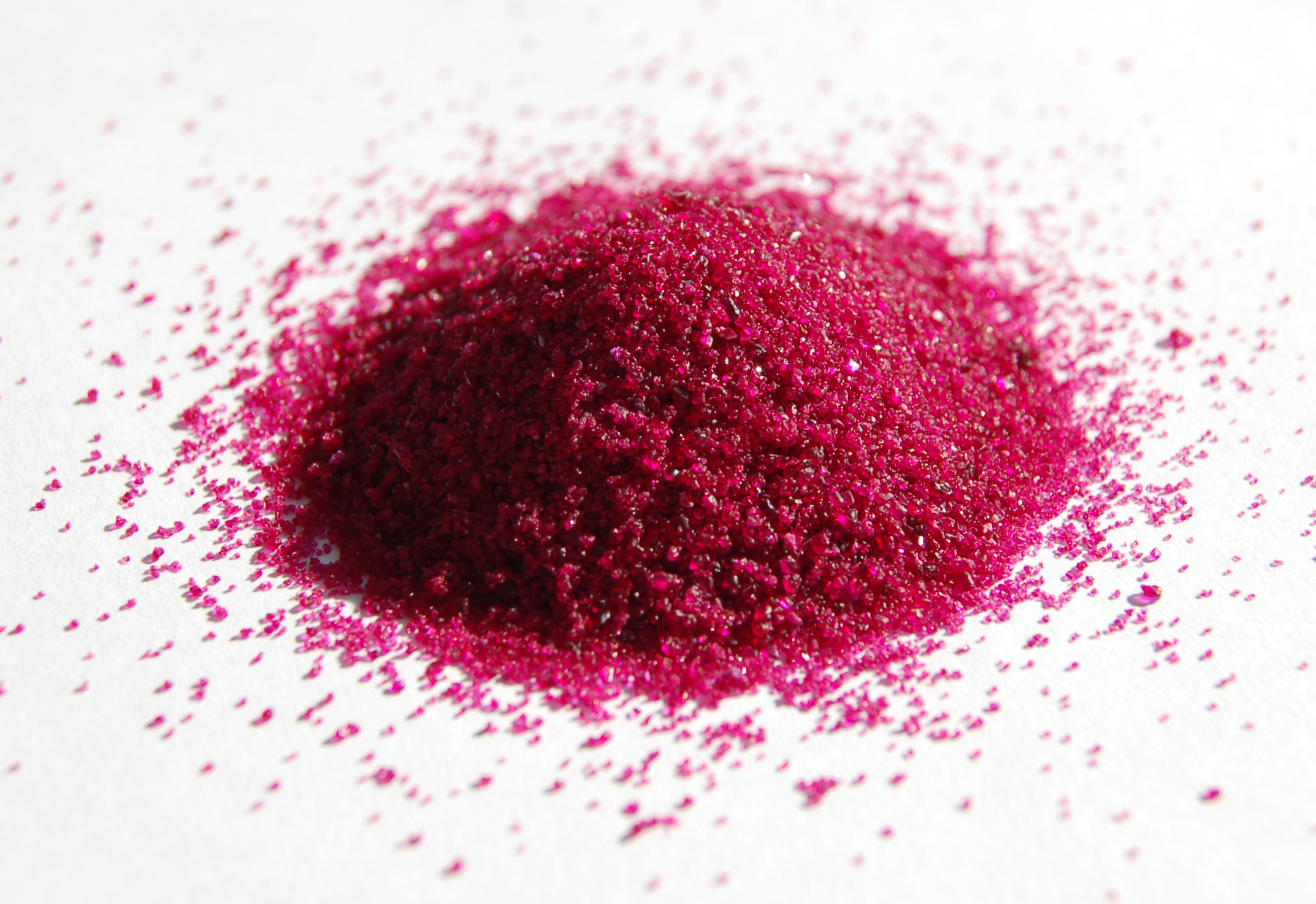
A sample of coblat(II) chloride hexahyrate, a compound of cobalt

Cobalt compounds are chemical compounds formed by cobalt with other elements.

== Inorganic compounds ==
=== Halides ===
Many halides of cobalt(II) are known: cobalt(II) fluoride (CoF_{2}) which is a pink solid, cobalt(II) chloride (CoCl_{2}) which is a blue solid, cobalt(II) bromide (CoBr_{2}) which is a green solid, and cobalt(II) iodide (CoI_{2}) which is a blue-black solid. In addition to the anhydrous forms, these cobalt halides also have hydrates. Anhydrous cobalt(II) chloride is blue, while the hexahydrate is magenta in colour. Because cobalt(II) chloride changes color upon hydration, it can be used to manufacture color-changing silica gel.

Anhydrous cobalt halides react with nitric oxide at 70~120 °C to generate [Co(NO)_{2}X]_{2} (X = Cl, Br or I). The complex of cobalt halides and triethylphosphine ((C_{2}H_{5})_{3}P) can absorb nitric monoxide in benzene to form the diamagnetic material Co(NO)X_{2}(P(C_{2}H_{5})_{3})

In the reaction Co^{3+} + e^{−} → Co^{2+}, the potential is +1.92 V, which is higher than that of Cl_{2} to Cl^{−} (+1.36 V). Therefore, the interaction of Co^{3+} with Cl− produces Co^{2+} and releases chlorine gas. The potential from F_{2} to F^{−} is as high as +2.87 V, and cobalt(III) fluoride (CoF_{3}) can exist stably. It is a fluorinated reagent and reacts violently with water.

=== Oxides and hydroxides ===
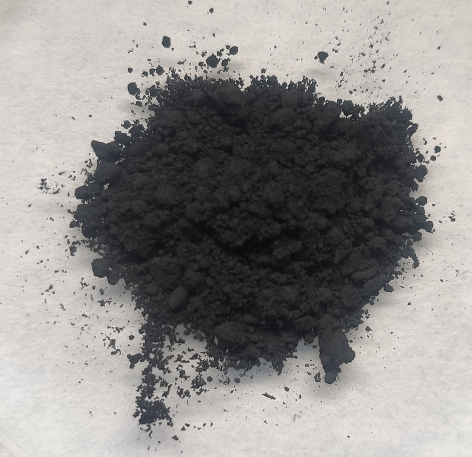
Cobalt(II,III) oxide

Cobalt can form various oxides, such as CoO, Co_{2}O_{3} and Co_{3}O_{4}. Co_{3}O_{4}, at 950 °C, decomposes to CoO.

Soluble cobalt salts react with sodium hydroxide to obtain cobalt(II) hydroxide (Co(OH)_{2}):

Co(NO_{3})_{2} + 2 NaOH → Co(OH)_{2}↓ + 2 NaNO_{3}

Cobalt(II) hydroxide can be oxidized to the Co(III) compound CoO(OH) under alkaline conditions.

=== Pnictogenides ===
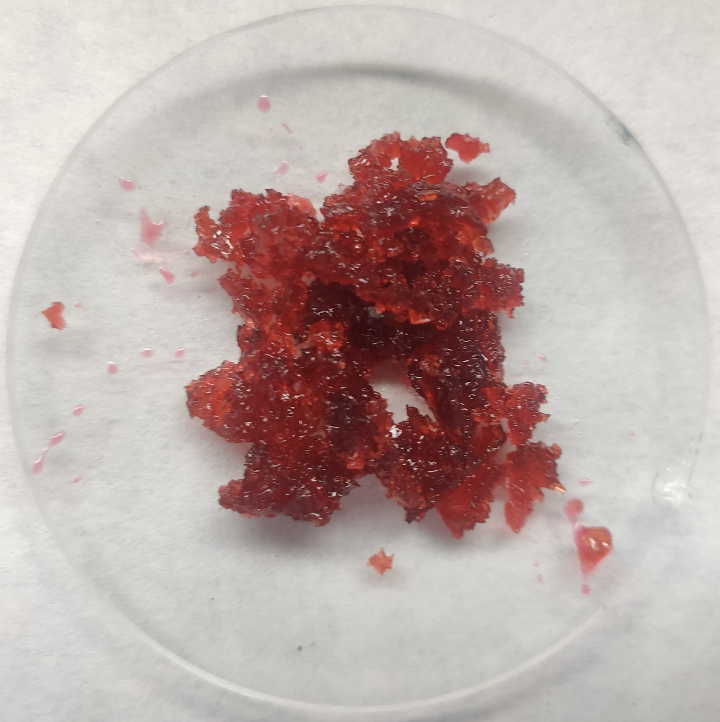
Cobalt(II) nitrate hexahydrate

Cobalt powder reacts with ammonia to form two kinds of nitrides, Co_{2}N and Co_{3}N. Cobalt reacts with phosphorus or arsenic to form Co_{2}P, CoP, CoP_{2}, CoAs_{2} and other substances. The former three compounds are of interest as catalysts for water electrolysis.

Cobalt(II) azide (Co(N_{3})_{2}) is another binary compound of cobalt and nitrogen that can explode when heated. Cobalt(II) and azide can form Co(N_{3})^{2−}_{4} complexes. Cobalt pentazolide Co(N_{5})_{2} was discovered in 2017, and it exists in the form of the hydrate [Co(H_{2}O)_{4}(N_{5})_{2}]·4H_{2}O. It decomposes at 50~145 °C to form cobalt(II) azide, becoming anhydrous and releasing nitrogen, and exploding when heated further. This compound can be obtained by reacting (N_{5})_{6}(H_{3}O)_{3}(NH_{4})_{4}Cl or Na(H_{2}O)(N_{5})]·2H_{2}O and [Co(H_{2}O)_{6}](NO_{3})_{2} at room temperature. Hydrogen bonding of water stabilizes this molecule.

Cobalt can easily react with nitric acid to form cobalt(II) nitrate Co(NO_{3})_{2}. Cobalt(II) nitrate exists in the anhydrous form and the hydrate form, of which the hexahydrate is the most common. Cobalt nitrate hexahydrate (Co(NO_{3})_{2}·6H_{2}O) is a red deliquescent crystal that is easily soluble in water, and its molecule contains cobalt(II) hydrated ions ([Co(H_{2}O)_{6}]^{2+}) and free nitrate ions. It can be obtained by precipitation from solution.

== Coordination compounds ==
As for all metals, molecular compounds and polyatomic ions of cobalt are classified as coordination complexes, that is, molecules or ions that contain cobalt linked to one or more ligands. These can be combinations of a potentially infinite variety of molecules and ions, such as:

- water H_{2}O, as in the cation hexaaquocobalt(II) [Co(H_{2}O)_{6}]^{2+}. This pink-colored complex is the predominant cation in solid cobalt sulfate CoSO_{4}·(H_{2}O)_{x}, with x = 6 or 7, as well as in water solutions thereof.
- ammonia NH_{3}, as in cis-diaquotetraamminecobalt(III) [Co(NH_{3})_{4}(H_{2}O)_{2}]^{3+}, in hexol [Co(Co(NH_{3})_{4}(HO)_{2})_{3}]^{6−}, in [Co(NO_{2})_{4}(NH_{3})_{2}]^{−} (the anion of Erdmann's salt), and in [Co(NH_{3})_{5}(CO_{3})]^{−}.
- carbonate [CO_{3}]^{2−}, as in the green triscarbonatocobaltate(III) [Co(CO_{3})_{3}]^{3−} anion.
- nitrite [NO_{2}]^{−} as in [Co(NO_{2})_{4}(NH_{3})_{2}]^{−}.
- hydroxide [HO]^{−}, as in hexol.
- chloride [Cl]^{−}, as in tetrachloridocobaltate(II) CoCl_{4}]^{2−}.
- bicarbonate [HCO_{3}]^{−}, as in [Co(CO_{3})_{2}(HCO_{3})(H_{2}O)]^{3−}.
- oxalate [C_{2}O_{4}]^{2−}, as in trisoxalatocobaltate(III) [Co(C_{2}O_{4})^{3−}_{3]}.

These attached groups affect the stability of oxidation states of the cobalt atoms, according to general principles of electronegativity and of the hardness–softness. For example, Co^{3+} complexes tend to have ammine ligands. Because phosphorus is softer than nitrogen, phosphine ligands tend to feature the softer Co^{2+} and Co^{+}, an example being tris(triphenylphosphine)cobalt(I) chloride (P(C_{6}H_{5})_{3})_{3}CoCl). The more electronegative (and harder) oxide and fluoride can stabilize Co^{4+} and Co^{5+} derivatives, e.g. caesium hexafluorocobaltate(IV) (Cs_{2}CoF_{6}) and potassium percobaltate (K_{3}CoO_{4}). The unusually high oxidation state +IV can also be stabilized by ligands based on [B_{11}H_{11}]^{4−} in some metallaboranes.

Alfred Werner, a Nobel-prize winning pioneer in coordination chemistry, worked with compounds of empirical formula [Co(NH_{3})_{6}]^{3+}. One of the isomers determined was cobalt(III) hexammine chloride. This coordination complex, a typical Werner-type complex, consists of a central cobalt atom coordinated by six ammine orthogonal ligands and three chloride counteranions. Using chelating ethylenediamine ligands in place of ammonia gives tris(ethylenediamine)cobalt(III) ([Co(en)_{3}]^{3+}), which was one of the first coordination complexes to be resolved into optical isomers. The complex exists in the right- and left-handed forms of a "three-bladed propeller". This complex was first isolated by Werner as yellow-gold needle-like crystals.

== Organic compounds ==
Structure of Vitamin B12

Vitamin B12 is a cobalt-centered organic biomolecule, soluble in water, and involved in the methylation and synthesis of nucleic acid and neurotransmitter. The main source is the offal or meat of herbivorous animals.

Dicobalt octacarbonyl (Co_{2}(CO)_{8}) is an orange-red crystal with two isomers in solution:

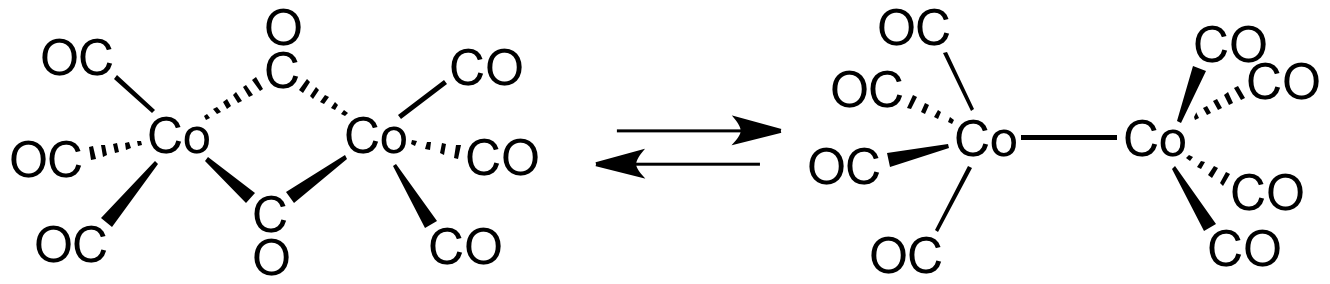

It reacts with hydrogen or sodium to form HCo(CO)_{4} or NaCo(CO)_{4}. It is a catalyst in carbonylation and hydrosilylation reactions.

Cobaltocene (Co(C_{5}H_{5})_{2}) is a cyclopentadiene complex of cobalt. It has 19 valence electrons and is easily oxidized to Co(C_{5}H_{5})^{+}_{2} with a stable structure of 18 electrons by reaction. It is a structural analog to ferrocene, with cobalt in place of iron. Cobaltocene is much more sensitive to oxidation than ferrocene.

== See also ==
- Iron compounds
- Nickel compounds
- Rhodium compounds
