= Hexol =

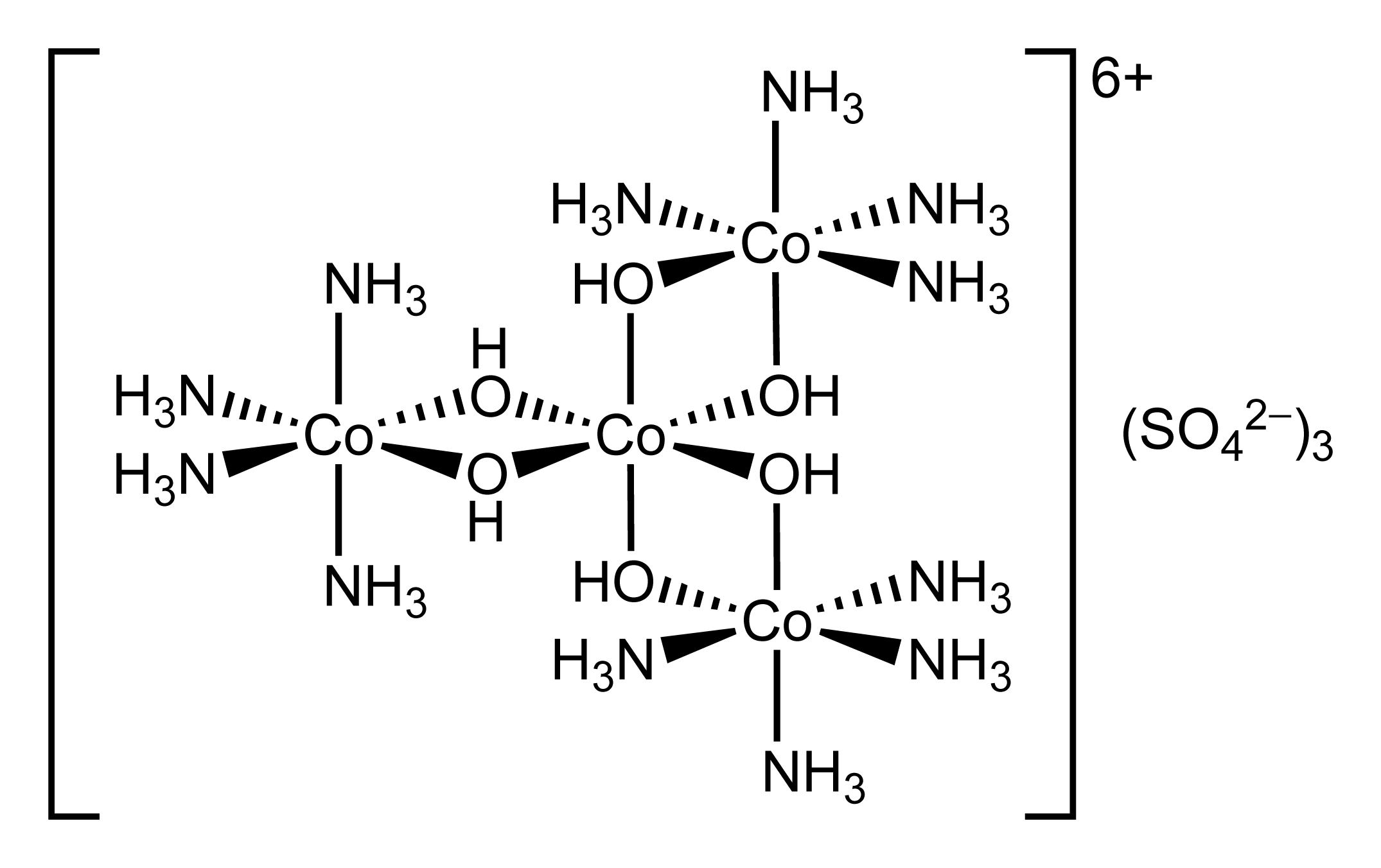

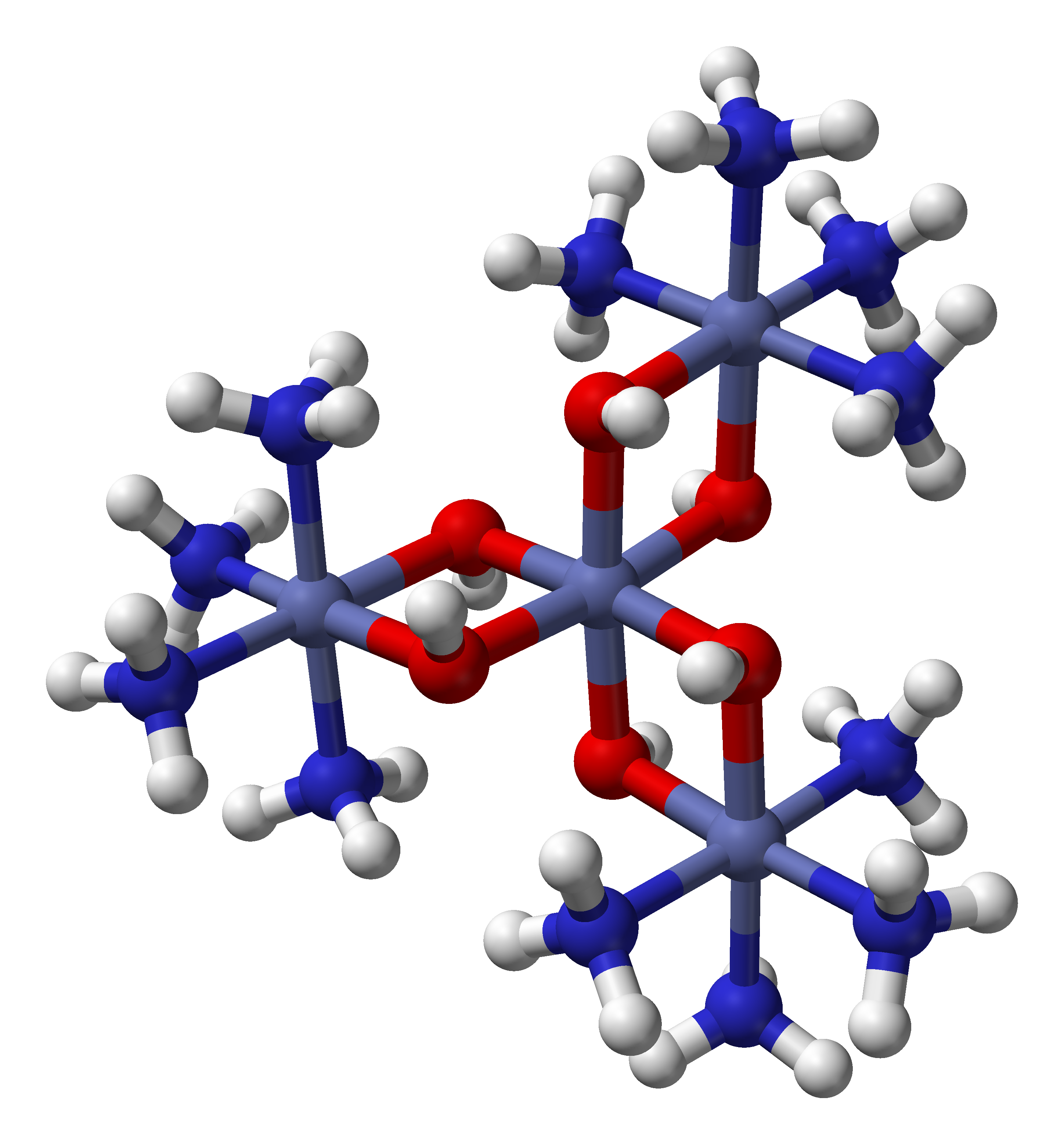

Names
- IUPAC name Tris[tetrammine-μ-dihydroxocobalt(III)]cobalt (III) ion

Identifiers
3D model (JSmol)	Interactive image
- InChI: InChI=1S/4Co.12H3N.3H2O4S.6HO/c;;;;;;;;;;;;;;;;3*1-5(2,3)4;;;;;;/h;;;;12*1H3;3*(H2,1,2,3,4);6*1H/q-3;3*+1;;;;;;;;;;;;;;;;6*+1/p-6 Key: WZHHSLNBXUIBMY-UHFFFAOYSA-H
- SMILES: O=S(=O)([O-])[O-].[NH3+][Co-3]0([NH3+])([NH3+])([NH3+])[OH+][Co-3]12([OH+]0)([OH+][Co-3]([NH3+])([NH3+])([NH3+])([NH3+])[OH+]1)[OH+][Co-3]([NH3+])([NH3+])([NH3+])([NH3+])[OH+]2.O=S(=O)([O-])[O-].O=S(=O)([O-])[O-]

Properties
Chemical formula	Co_{4}H_{42}N_{12}O_{18}S_{3}
Molar mass	830.31 g·mol^{−1}
Solubility in water	Sparingly soluble in water
- Except where otherwise noted, data are given for materials in their standard state (at 25 °C [77 °F], 100 kPa). verify (what is ?) Infobox references

In chemistry, hexol is a cation with formula {[Co(NH_{3})_{4}(OH)_{2}]_{3}Co}^{6+} — a coordination complex consisting of four cobalt cations in oxidation state +3, twelve ammonia molecules NH_{3}, and six hydroxy anions HO^{−}, with a net charge of +6. The hydroxy groups act as bridges between the central cobalt atom and the other three, which carry the ammonia ligands.

Salts of hexol, such as the sulfate {[Co(NH_{3})_{4}(OH)_{2}]_{3}Co}(SO_{4})_{3}(H_{2}O)_{x}, are of historical significance as the first synthetic non-carbon-containing chiral compounds.

== Preparation ==
Salts of hexol were first described by Jørgensen, although it was Werner who recognized its structure. The cation is prepared by heating a solution containing the cis-diaquotetramminecobalt(III) cation [Co(NH_{3})_{4}(H_{2}O)_{2}]^{3+} with a dilute base:

4 [Co(NH_{3})_{4}(H_{2}O)_{2}]^{3+} + 2 HO^{−} → {[Co(NH_{3})_{4}(OH)_{2}]_{3}Co}^{6+} + 4 NH_{4}^{+} + 4 H_{2}O

=== Hexol sulfate ===
Starting with the sulfate and using ammonium hydroxide as the base, depending on the conditions, one obtains the 9-hydrate, the 6-hydrate, or the 4-hydrate of hexol sulfate. These salts form dark brownish-violet or black tabular crystals, with low solubility in water. When treated with concentrated hydrochloric acid, hexol sulfate converts to cis-diaquotetramminecobalt(III) sulfate. In boiling dilute sulfuric acid, hexol sulfate further degrades with evolution of oxygen and nitrogen.

== Optical properties ==
The hexol cation exists as two optical isomers that are mirror images of each other, depending on the arrangement of the bonds between the central cobalt atom and the three bidentate peripheral units [Co(NH_{3})_{4}(HO)_{2}]. It belongs to the D_{3} point group. The nature of chirality can be compared to that of the ferrioxalate anion [Fe(C_{2}O_{4})_{3}]^{3−}.

In a historic set of experiments, a salt of hexol with an optically active anion — specifically, its D-(+)-bromocamphorsulfonate – was resolved into separate salts of the two cation isomers by fractional crystallisation. A more efficient resolution involves the bis(tartrato)diantimonate(III) anion. The hexol hexacation has a high specific rotation of 2640°.

== "Second hexol" ==
Werner also described a second achiral hexol (a minor byproduct from the production of Fremy's salt) that he incorrectly identified as a linear tetramer. The second hexol is hexanuclear (contains six cobalt centres in each ion), not tetranuclear. Its point group is C_{2h}, and its formula is [Co_{6}(NH_{3})_{14}(OH)_{8}O_{2}]^{6+}, whereas that of hexol is [Co_{4}(NH_{3})_{12}(OH)_{6}]^{6+}.

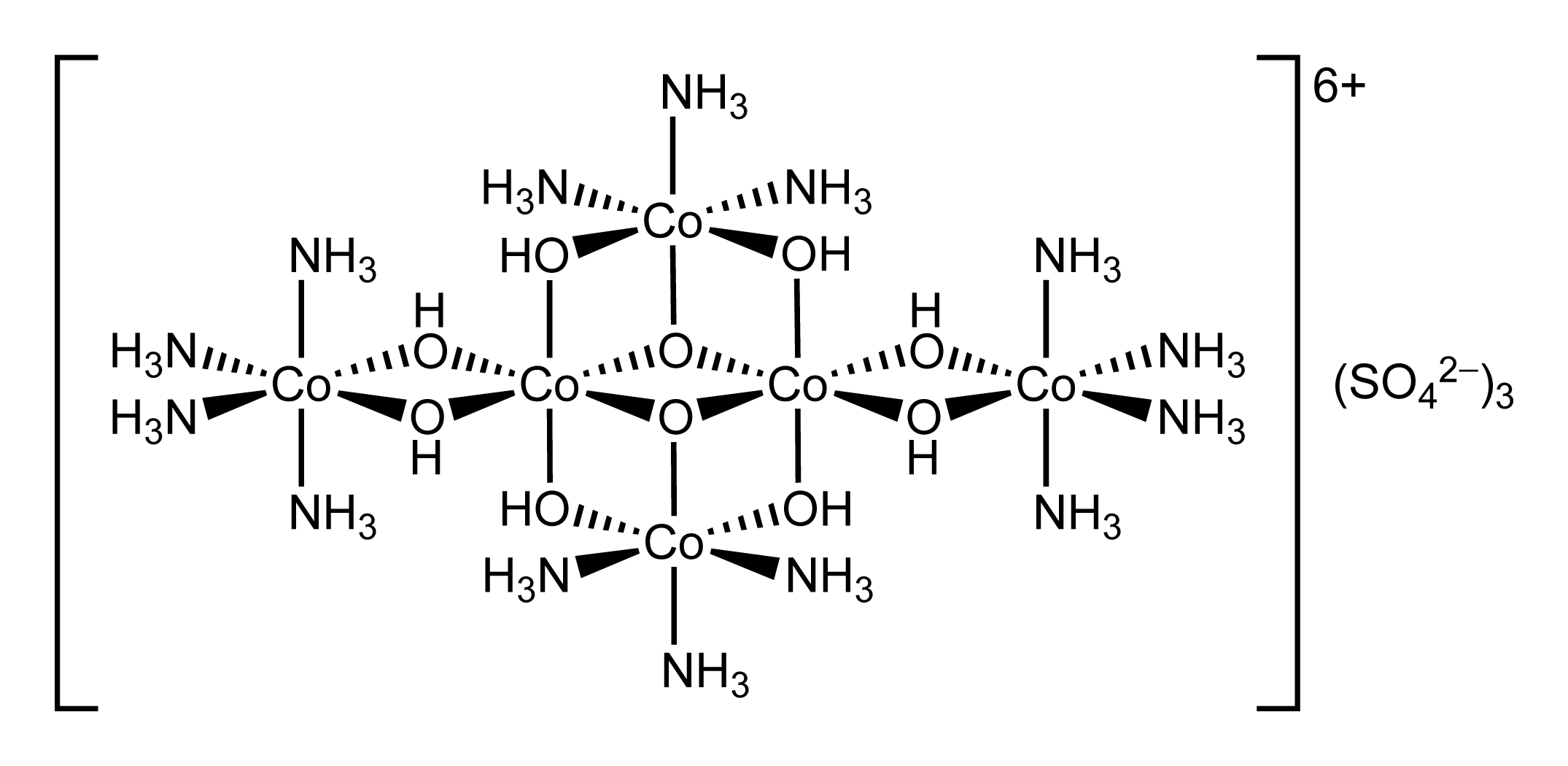
