= Arsenopyrite =

Iron-arsenic sulfide mineral

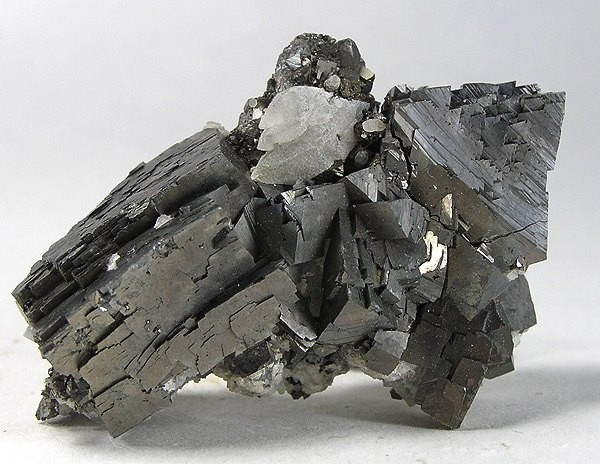

General
- Category: Sulfide mineral
- Formula: FeAsS
- Strunz classification: 2.EB.20
- Crystal system: Monoclinic
- Crystal class: Prismatic (2/m) (same H-M symbol)
- Space group: P2_{1}/c
- Unit cell: a = 5.744, b = 5.675 c = 5.785 [Å]; β = 112.3°; Z = 4

Identification
- Colour: Steel grey to silver white
- Crystal habit: Acicular, off-square prismatic, stubby; striated; also compact, granular, columnar
- Twinning: Common on {100} and {001}, contact/penetration twinning on {101}
- Cleavage: 110 (distinct)
- Fracture: Subconchoidal to rough
- Tenacity: Brittle
- Mohs scale hardness: 5.5–6
- Lustre: Metallic
- Streak: Black
- Diaphaneity: Opaque
- Specific gravity: 5.9–6.2
- Optical properties: Anisotropism – strong red-violet
- Pleochroism: Weak, white or bluish tint, faint reddish yellow
- Fusibility: Yes
- Solubility: Nitric acid
- Other characteristics: Garlic odour when struck, greenish tinge when weathered, green staining of wall rocks

Arsenopyrite (IMA symbol: Apy) is an iron arsenic sulfide (FeAsS). It is a hard (Mohs 5.5–6) metallic, opaque, steel grey to silver white mineral with a relatively high relative density of 6.1.

When dissolved in nitric acid, it releases elemental sulfur. When arsenopyrite is heated, it produces sulfur and arsenic vapor. With 46% arsenic content, arsenopyrite, along with orpiment, is a principal ore of arsenic. When deposits of arsenopyrite become exposed to the atmosphere, the mineral slowly converts into iron arsenates. Arsenopyrite is generally an acid-consuming sulfide mineral, unlike iron pyrite which can lead to acid mine drainage.

The crystal habit, hardness, density, and garlic odour when struck are diagnostic. Arsenopyrite in older literature may be referred to as mispickel, a name of German origin. It is also sometimes referred to as mundic, a word derived from Cornish dialect and which also refers to a copper ore, as well as a form of deterioration in aggregate concrete made with mine tailings.

Arsenopyrite also can be associated with significant amounts of gold. Consequently, it serves as an indicator of gold bearing reefs. Many arsenopyrite gold ores are refractory, i.e. the gold is not easily cyanide leached from the mineral matrix.

Arsenopyrite is found in high temperature hydrothermal veins, in pegmatites, and in areas of contact metamorphism or metasomatism.

== Crystallography ==
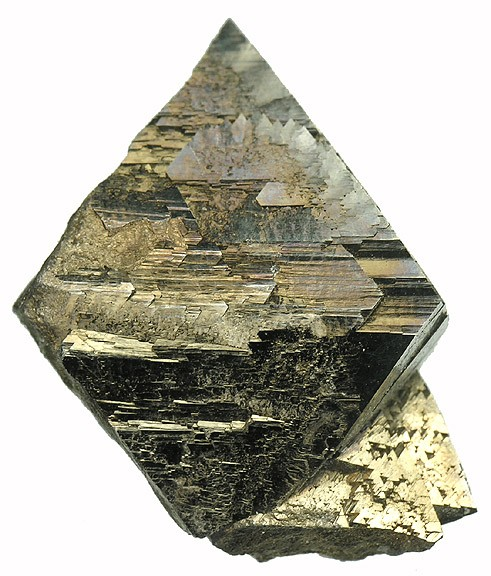
Arsenopyrite crystal from the Yaogangxian Mine, Hunan, China (size: 2.7 × 2.0 × 1.7 cm)

Arsenopyrite crystallizes in the monoclinic crystal system and often shows prismatic crystal or columnar forms with striations and twinning common. Arsenopyrite may be referred to in older references as orthorhombic, but it has been shown to be monoclinic. In terms of its atomic structure, each Fe center is linked to three As atoms and three S atoms. The material can be described as Fe^{3+} with the diatomic trianion AsS^{3−}. The connectivity of the atoms is more similar to that in marcasite than pyrite. The ion description is imperfect because the material is semiconducting and the Fe-As and Fe-S bonds are highly covalent.

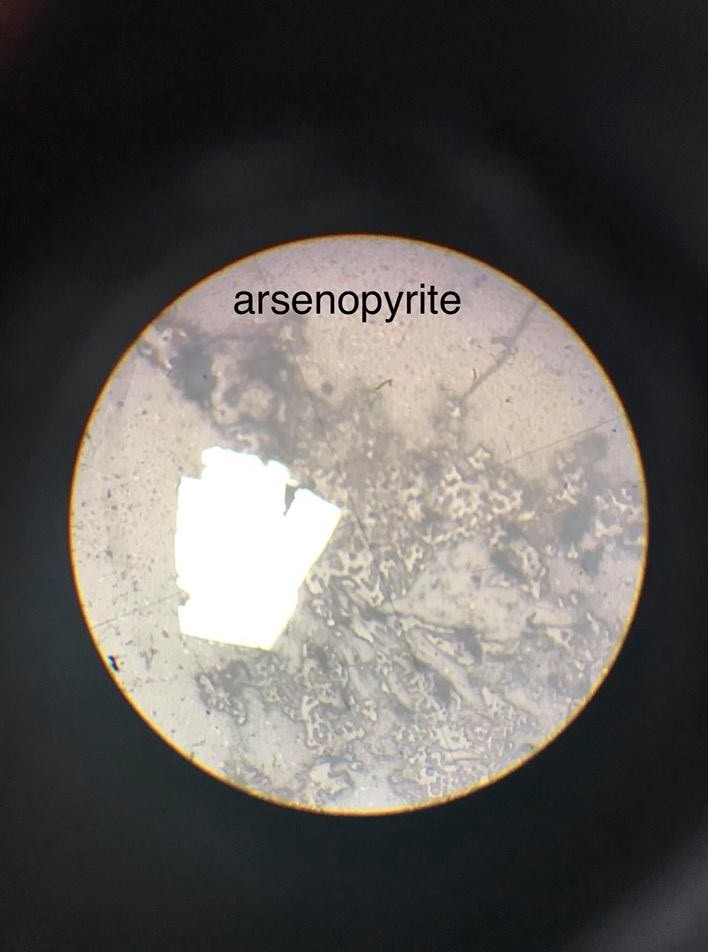
Microscopic picture of arsenopyrite

== Related minerals ==
Various transition group metals can substitute for iron in arsenopyrite. The arsenopyrite group includes the following rare minerals:

- Clinosafflorite: (Co,Fe,Ni)AsS
- Gudmundite: FeSbS
- Glaucodot or alloclasite: (Fe,Co)AsS or (Co,Fe)AsS
- Iridarsenite: (Ir,Ru)AsS
- Osarsite or ruarsite: (Os,Ru)AsS or (Ru,Os)AsS

== See also ==
- Classification of minerals
- List of minerals
