= Glaucodot =

Sulfide mineral

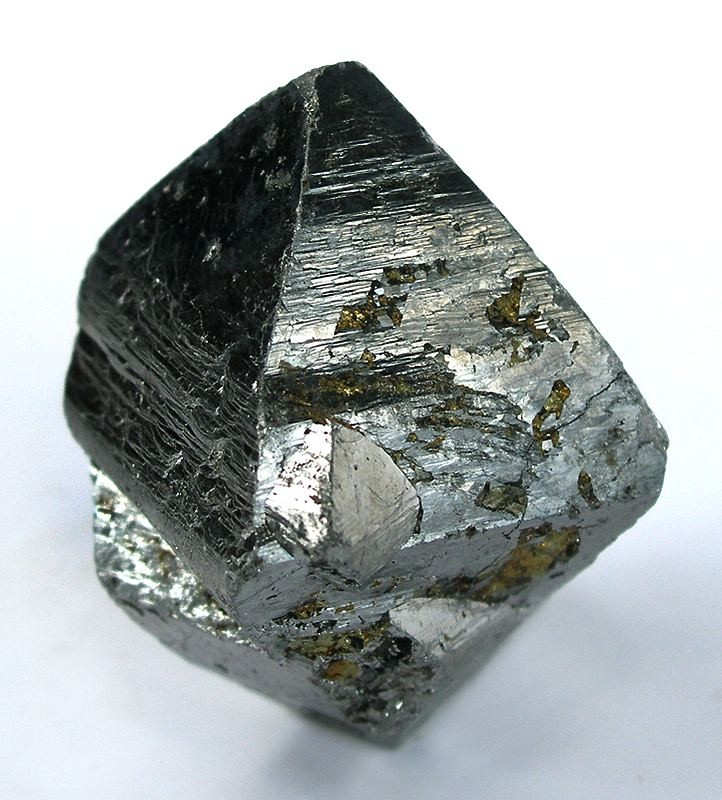
- Glaucodot from Håkansboda, Lindesberg, Sweden. Size: 3.3 × 2.7 × 2.6 cm.

General
- Category: Sulfide minerals
- Formula: (Co,Fe)AsS (Co_{0.75}Fe^{2+}_{0.25}AsS)
- IMA symbol: Gl
- Strunz classification: 2.EB.10c
- Crystal system: Orthorhombic
- Crystal class: Prismatic (2/m) (same H-M symbol)
- Space group: P2_{1}/c

Identification
- Formula mass: 165.15 g/mol
- Color: Grayish tin white, Reddish silver white
- Crystal habit: Massive, prismatic habits with elongated sphenoids, granular masses- Uniformly indistinguishable crystals forming large masses.
- Cleavage: None
- Fracture: Brittle – Uneven – Very brittle fracture producing uneven fragments.
- Mohs scale hardness: 5
- Luster: Metallic
- Streak: black
- Diaphaneity: Opaque
- Specific gravity: 5.9–6.01, Average = 5.95
- Ultraviolet fluorescence: inert
- Other characteristics: Nonmagnetic, non-radioactive

Glaucodot is a cobalt iron arsenic sulfide mineral with formula (Co,Fe)AsS. The cobalt:iron(II) ratio is typically 3:1 with minor nickel substituting. It forms a series with arsenopyrite (FeAsS). It is an opaque grey to tin-white typically found as massive forms without external crystal form. It crystallizes in the orthorhombic system. The locality at Håkansboda, Sweden has rare twinned dipyramidal crystals (see photo). It is brittle with a Mohs hardness of 5 and a specific gravity of 5.95. It occurs in high temperature hydrothermal deposits with pyrrhotite and chalcopyrite. Glaucodot is classed as a sulfide in the arsenopyrite löllingite group.

Glaucodot was first described in 1849 in Huasco, Valparaíso Province, Chile. Its name originates from the Ancient Greek: γλανκός ("blue") in reference to its use in the dark blue glass called smalt.
