= Caesium hexafluorocobaltate(IV) =

Identifiers
CAS Number	17250-28-1
3D model (JSmol)	Interactive image
- InChI: InChI=1S/2Cs.Cu.6FH/h;;;6*1H/q2*+1;+4;;;;;;/p-6 Key: JSYFPWMRKBASLN-UHFFFAOYSA-H
- SMILES: [Cs+].[Cs+].F[Co-2](F)(F)(F)(F)F

Properties
Chemical formula	CoCs_{2}F_{6}
Molar mass	438.734517 g·mol^{−1}
- Except where otherwise noted, data are given for materials in their standard state (at 25 °C [77 °F], 100 kPa). Infobox references

Caesium hexafluorocobaltate(IV) is a salt with the chemical formula Cs_{2}CoF_{6}. It can be synthesized by the reaction of Cs_{3}[(CoCl_{4})Cl] and fluorine. The salt contains rare example of cobalt(IV) complex, i.e. [CoF_{6}]^{2-}.

It has cubic K_{2}PtCl_{6} structure, with the lattice constant a = 8.91 Å, and the length of Co-F bond is 1.73 Å. The complex is ferromagnetic and the ground state of Co(IV) is T_{2g}^{3}E_{g}^{2}.

== See also ==
- Percobaltate
