= Percobaltate =

Chemical compounds

Percobaltates are chemical compounds where the oxidation state of cobalt is +5. This is the highest established oxidation state of cobalt. The simplest of these are bi-metallic Group 1 oxides such as sodium percobaltate (Na_{3}CoO_{4}); which may be produced by the reaction of cobalt(II,III) oxide and sodium oxide, using oxygen as the oxidant:

4 Co_{3}O_{4} + 18 Na_{2}O + 7 O_{2} → 12 Na_{3}CoO_{4}

The potassium salt can be synthesized similarly; its magnetic moment has indicated the existence of cobalt(V). No crystallographic analysis has been reported for either material. Percobaltates can be stabilized by use of oxides or fluorides.

A number of organometallic Co(V) complexes have also been reported.

== See also ==
- Caesium hexafluorocobaltate(IV)
