= Cobalt =

Cobalt, _{27}Co
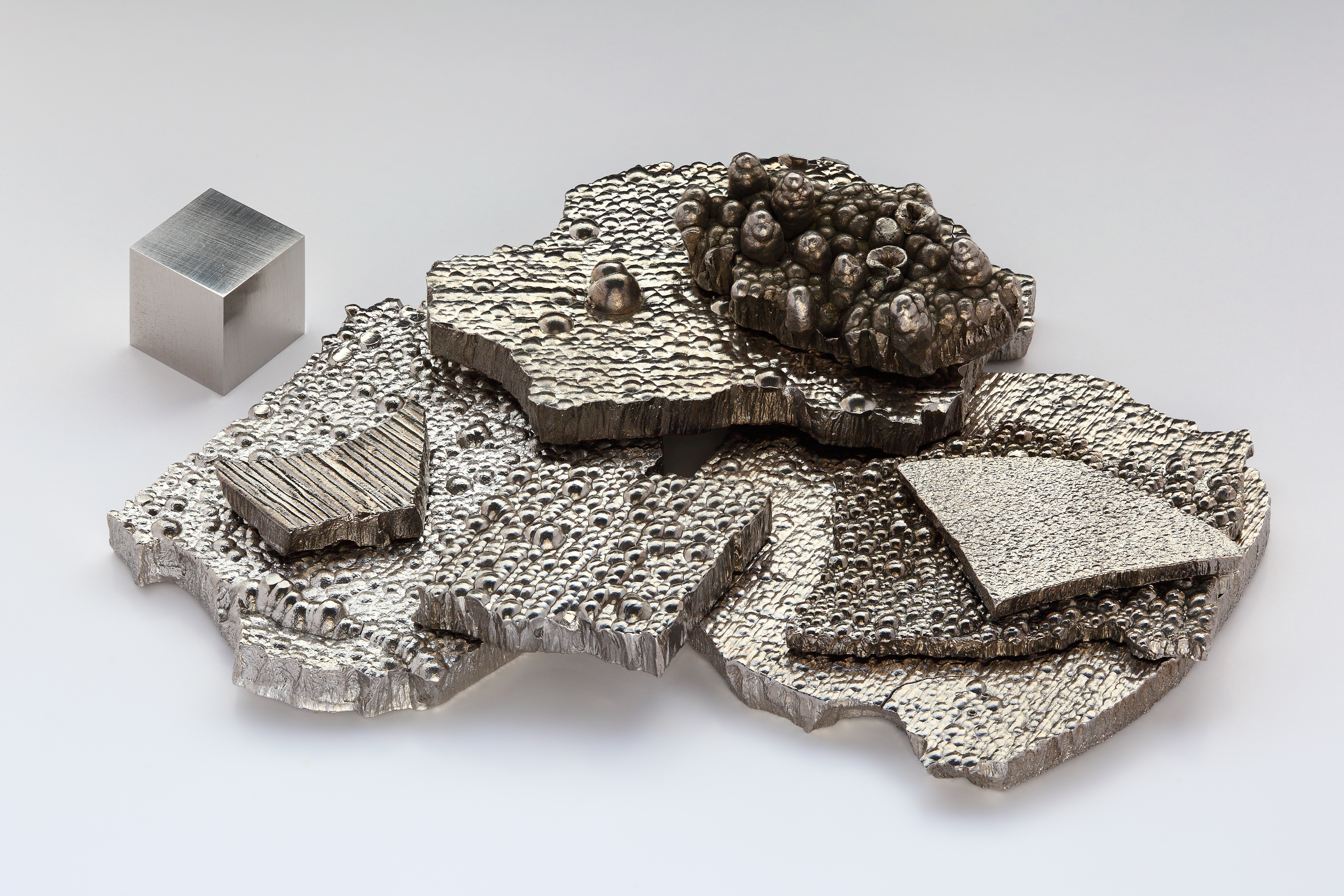

Cobalt
- Pronunciation: /ˈkoʊbɒlt/
- Appearance: Hard lustrous bluish gray metal

Standard atomic weight A_{r}°(Co)
- 58.933194±0.000003; 58.933±0.001 (abridged)

Cobalt in the periodic table
Hydrogen																															Helium
Lithium	Beryllium																									Boron	Carbon	Nitrogen	Oxygen	Fluorine	Neon
Sodium	Magnesium																									Aluminium	Silicon	Phosphorus	Sulfur	Chlorine	Argon
Potassium	Calcium															Scandium	Titanium	Vanadium	Chromium	Manganese	Iron	Cobalt	Nickel	Copper	Zinc	Gallium	Germanium	Arsenic	Selenium	Bromine	Krypton
Rubidium	Strontium															Yttrium	Zirconium	Niobium	Molybdenum	Technetium	Ruthenium	Rhodium	Palladium	Silver	Cadmium	Indium	Tin	Antimony	Tellurium	Iodine	Xenon
Caesium	Barium	Lanthanum	Cerium	Praseodymium	Neodymium	Promethium	Samarium	Europium	Gadolinium	Terbium	Dysprosium	Holmium	Erbium	Thulium	Ytterbium	Lutetium	Hafnium	Tantalum	Tungsten	Rhenium	Osmium	Iridium	Platinum	Gold	Mercury (element)	Thallium	Lead	Bismuth	Polonium	Astatine	Radon
Francium	Radium	Actinium	Thorium	Protactinium	Uranium	Neptunium	Plutonium	Americium	Curium	Berkelium	Californium	Einsteinium	Fermium	Mendelevium	Nobelium	Lawrencium	Rutherfordium	Dubnium	Seaborgium	Bohrium	Hassium	Meitnerium	Darmstadtium	Roentgenium	Copernicium	Nihonium	Flerovium	Moscovium	Livermorium	Tennessine	Oganesson
–
↑
Co
↓
Rh
iron ← cobalt → nickel
- Atomic number (Z): 27
- Group: group 9
- Period: period 4
- Block: d-block
- Electron configuration: [Ar] 3d^{7} 4s^{2}
- Electrons per shell: 2, 8, 15, 2

Physical properties
- Phase at STP: solid
- Melting point: 1768 K (1495 °C, 2723 °F)
- Boiling point: 3200 K (2927 °C, 5301 °F)
- Density (at 20° C): 8.834 g/cm^{3}
- when liquid (at m.p.): 7.75 g/cm^{3}
- Heat of fusion: 16.06 kJ/mol
- Heat of vaporization: 377 kJ/mol
- Molar heat capacity: 24.81 J/(mol·K)
- Specific heat capacity: 420.987 J/(kg·K)
Vapor pressure
P (Pa)	1	10	100	1 k	10 k	100 k
at T (K)	1790	1960	2165	2423	2755	3198

Atomic properties
- Oxidation states: common: +2, +3 −3, −1, 0, +1, +4, +5
- Electronegativity: Pauling scale: 1.88
- Ionization energies: 1st: 760.4 kJ/mol; 2nd: 1648 kJ/mol; 3rd: 3232 kJ/mol; (more)
- Atomic radius: empirical: 125 pm
- Covalent radius: Low spin: 126±3 pm High spin: 150±7 pm
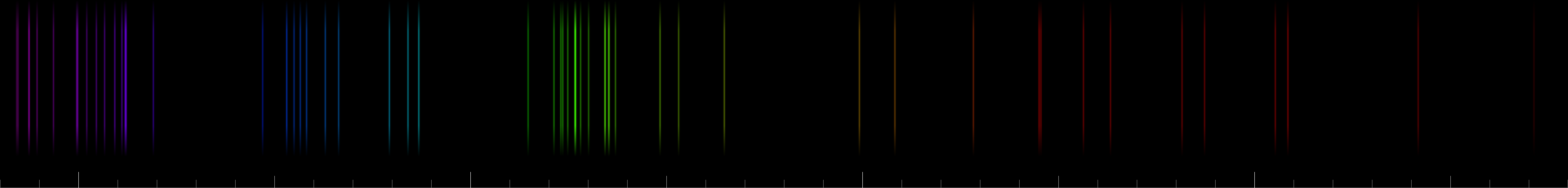
- Spectral lines of cobalt

Other properties
- Natural occurrence: primordial
- Crystal structure: hexagonal close-packed (hcp) (hP2)
- Lattice constants: a = 250.71 pm c = 407.00 pm (at 20 °C)
- Thermal expansion: 12.9×10^{−6}/K (at 20 °C) (Note: The thermal expansion of cobalt is anisotropic: the coefficients for each crystal axis are (at 20 °C): α_{a} = 10.9×10^{−6}/K, α_{c} = 17.9×10^{−6}/K, and α_{average} = α_{V}/3 = 12.9×10^{−6}/K.)
- Thermal conductivity: 100 W/(m⋅K)
- Electrical resistivity: 62.4 nΩ⋅m (at 20 °C)
- Magnetic ordering: Ferromagnetic
- Young's modulus: 209 GPa
- Shear modulus: 75 GPa
- Bulk modulus: 180 GPa
- Speed of sound thin rod: 4720 m/s (at 20 °C)
- Poisson ratio: 0.31
- Mohs hardness: 5.0
- Vickers hardness: 1043 MPa
- Brinell hardness: 470–3000 MPa
- CAS Number: 7440-48-4

History
- Naming: from the kobelt ore, possibly named after Kobolds
- Discovery and first isolation: Georg Brandt (1735)

Isotopes of cobalt
Main isotopes			Decay	
Isotope	abundance	half-life (t_{1/2})	mode	product
^{56}Co	synth	77.24 d	β^{+}	^{56}Fe
^{57}Co	synth	271.81 d	ε	^{57}Fe
^{58}Co	synth	70.84 d	β^{+}	^{58}Fe
^{59}Co	100%	stable		
^{60}Co	(unstable)	5.2714 y	β^{−}	^{60}Ni

Cobalt is a chemical element; it has symbol Co and atomic number 27. As with nickel, cobalt is found in the Earth's crust only in a chemically combined form, save for small deposits found in alloys of natural meteoric iron. The free element, produced by reductive smelting, is a hard, lustrous, somewhat brittle, gray metal.

Cobalt-based blue pigments (cobalt blue) have been used since antiquity for jewelry and paints, and to impart a distinctive blue tint to glass. The color was long thought to be due to the metal bismuth. The name cobalt derives from a type of ore considered a nuisance by 16th-century German silver miners, which in turn may have been named from a spirit or goblin held superstitiously responsible for it; this spirit is considered equivalent to the kobold (a household spirit) by some, or categorized as a gnome (mine spirit) by others.

Today, cobalt is usually produced as a by-product of copper and nickel mining, but sometimes also from one of a number of metallic-lustered ores such as cobaltite (CoAsS). The Copperbelt in the Democratic Republic of the Congo (DRC) and Zambia yields most of the global cobalt production. World production in 2016 was 116,000 tonnes (114,000 long tons; 128,000 short tons) according to Natural Resources Canada, and the DRC alone accounted for more than 50%. In 2024, production exceeded 300,000 tons, of which DRC accounted for more than 80%.

Cobalt is primarily used in lithium-ion batteries, and in the manufacture of magnetic, wear-resistant and high-strength alloys. The compounds cobalt silicate and cobalt(II) aluminate (CoAl_{2}O_{4}, cobalt blue) give a distinctive deep blue color to glass, ceramics, inks, paints and varnishes. Cobalt occurs naturally as only one stable isotope, cobalt-59. Cobalt-60 is a commercially important radioisotope, used as a radioactive tracer and for the production of high-energy gamma rays. Cobalt is also used in the petroleum industry as a catalyst when refining crude oil. This is to purge it of sulfur, which is very polluting when burned and causes acid rain.

Cobalt is the active center of a group of coenzymes called cobalamins, also known as Vitamin B_{12}, which is an essential vitamin for all animals. Cobalt in inorganic form is also a micronutrient for bacteria, algae, and fungi.

== Characteristics ==
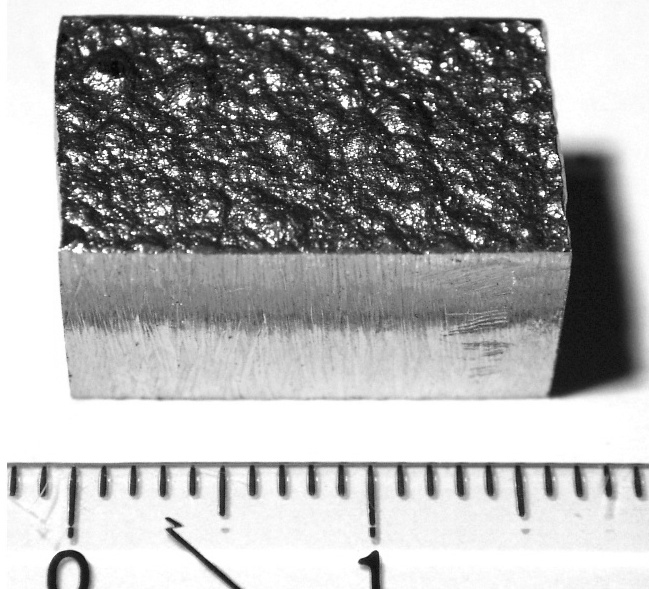
A block of electrolytically refined cobalt (99.9% purity) cut from a large plate

Cobalt is a ferromagnetic metal with a specific gravity of 8.9. The Curie temperature is 1,115 °C (1,388 K; 2,039 °F) and the magnetic moment is 1.6–1.7 Bohr magnetons per atom. Cobalt has a relative permeability two-thirds that of iron. Metallic cobalt occurs as two crystallographic structures: hcp and fcc. The ideal transition temperature between the hcp and fcc structures is 450 °C (723 K; 842 °F), but in practice the energy difference between them is so small that random intergrowth of the two is common.

Cobalt is a weakly reducing metal that is protected from oxidation by a passivating oxide film. It is attacked by halogens and sulfur. Heating in oxygen produces Co_{3}O_{4} which loses oxygen at 900 °C (1,170 K; 1,650 °F) to give the monoxide CoO. The metal reacts with fluorine (F_{2}) at 520 K (247 °C) to give CoF_{3}; with chlorine (Cl_{2}), bromine (Br_{2}) and iodine (I_{2}), producing equivalent binary halides. It does not react with hydrogen gas (H_{2}) or nitrogen gas (N_{2}) even when heated, but it does react with boron, carbon, phosphorus, arsenic and sulfur. At ordinary temperatures, it reacts slowly with mineral acids, and very slowly with moist, but not dry, air.

== Compounds ==
Common oxidation states of cobalt include +2 and +3, although compounds with oxidation states ranging from −3 to +5 are also known. A common oxidation state for simple compounds is +2 (cobalt(II)). These salts form the pink-colored metal aquo complex [Co(H_{2}O)_{6}]^{2+} in water. Addition of chloride gives the intensely blue [CoCl_{4}]^{2−}. In a borax bead flame test, cobalt shows deep blue in both oxidizing and reducing flames.

=== Oxygen and chalcogen compounds ===
Several binary oxides of cobalt are known. Green cobalt(II) oxide (CoO) has rocksalt structure. It is readily oxidized with water and oxygen to brown cobalt(III) hydroxide (Co(OH)_{3}). At temperatures of 600–700 °C, CoO oxidizes to the blue cobalt(II,III) oxide (Co_{3}O_{4}), which has a spinel structure. Black cobalt(III) oxide (Co_{2}O_{3}) is also known. Cobalt oxides are antiferromagnetic at low temperature: CoO (Néel temperature 291 K (18 °C)) and Co_{3}O_{4} (Néel temperature: 40 K (−233.2 °C)), which is analogous to magnetite (Fe_{3}O_{4}), with a mixture of +2 and +3 oxidation states. Potassium percobaltate (K_{3}CoO_{4}) contains a rare example of a cobalt(V) complex.

The principal chalcogenides of cobalt are the black cobalt(II) sulfides, CoS_{2} (pyrite structure), Co_{2}S_{3} (spinel structure), and CoS (nickel arsenide structure).

=== Halides ===
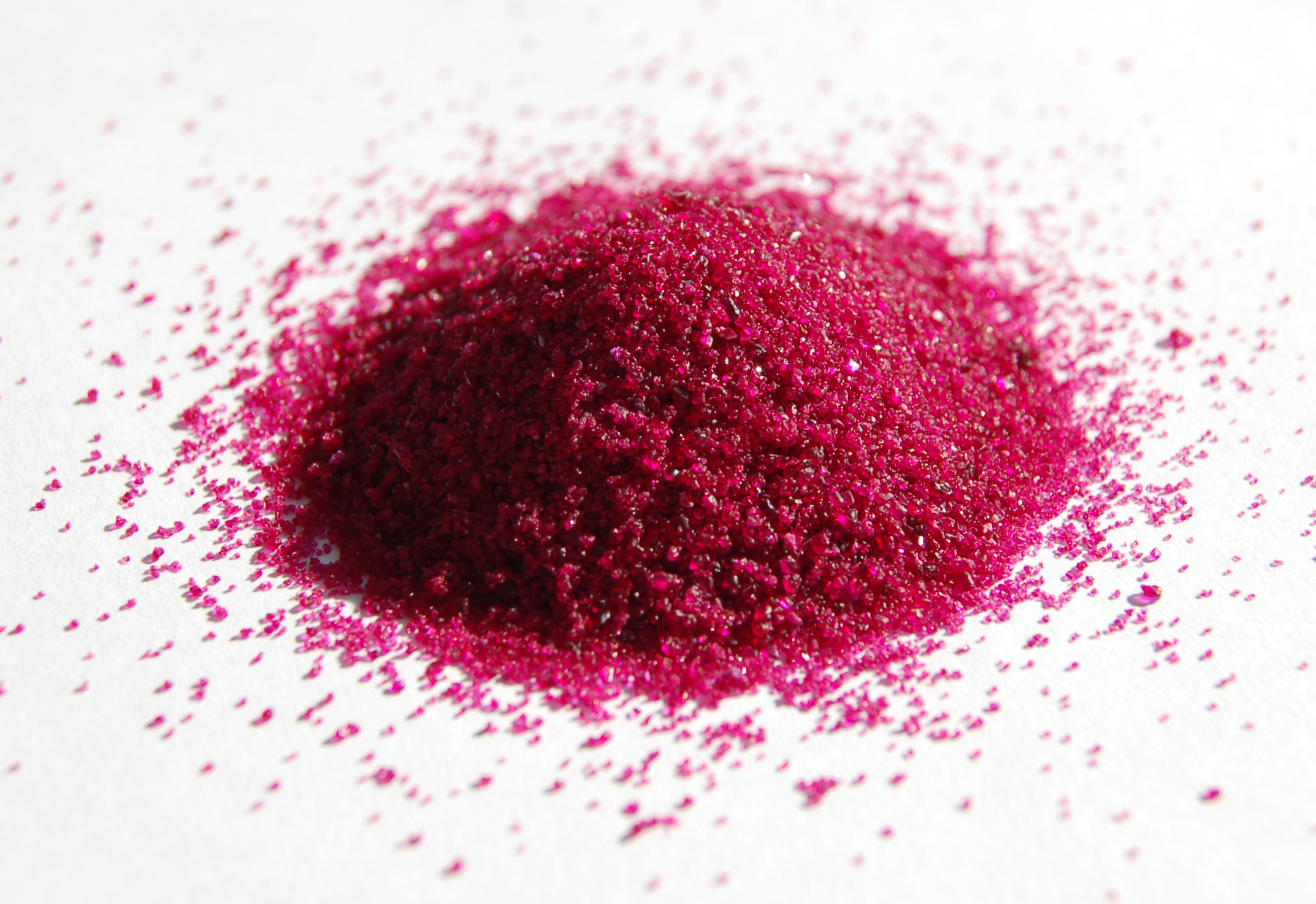
Cobalt(II) chloride hexahydrate

The salt caesium hexafluorocobaltate(IV) (Cs_{2}CoF_{6}) is a rare example of cobalt(IV). The reduction potential for the reaction Co^{3+} + e^{−} → Co^{2+} is +1.92 V, beyond that for chlorine to chloride, +1.36 V. Consequently, cobalt(III) chloride would spontaneously reduce to cobalt(II) chloride and chlorine. Because the reduction potential for fluorine to fluoride is so high, +2.87 V, cobalt(III) fluoride is one of the few simple stable cobalt(III) compounds. Cobalt(III) fluoride, which is used in some fluorination reactions, reacts vigorously with water.

Four dihalides of cobalt(II) are known: cobalt(II) fluoride (CoF_{2}, pink), cobalt(II) chloride (CoCl_{2}, blue), cobalt(II) bromide (CoBr_{2}, green), cobalt(II) iodide (CoI_{2}, blue-black). These halides also exist in hydrated forms. Whereas the anhydrous dichloride is blue, the hydrate is red. The pink-colored cation hexaaquocobalt(II) [Co(H_{2}O)_{6}]^{2+} is found in several routine cobalt salts such as the nitrate and sulfate.

=== Coordination complexes ===
A large inventory of complexes exists for cobalt(III) bound to ammonia and amines (called ammine complexes). Examples include [Co(NH_{3})_{6}]^{3+}, [Co(NH_{3})_{5}Cl]^{2+} (chloropentamminecobalt(III)), and cis- and trans-[Co(NH_{3})_{4}Cl_{2}]^{+}. The corresponding ethylenediamine complexes are also well known. Analogues are known where the halides are replaced by nitrite, hydroxide, carbonate, etc. Alfred Werner worked extensively on these complexes in his Nobel-prize winning work. The robustness of these complexes is demonstrated by the optical resolution of tris(ethylenediamine)cobalt(III) ([Co(en)_{3}]^{3+}).

The unusually high oxidation state +IV of cobalt can be stabilized by ligands based on [B_{11}H_{11}]^{4−} in dark blue colored crystals. Softer ligands like triphenylphosphine form complexes with Co(II) and Co(I), examples being bis- and tris(triphenylphosphine)cobalt(I) chloride, CoCl_{2}(PPh_{3})_{2} and CoCl(PPh_{3})_{3}.

=== Organometallic compounds ===
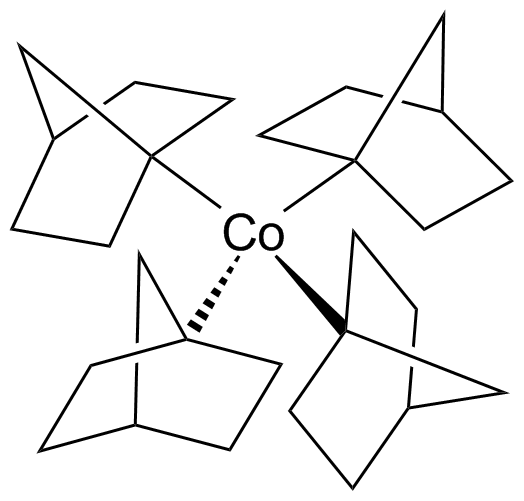
Structure of tetrakis(1-norbornyl)cobalt(IV)

Cobaltocene is a structural analog to ferrocene, with cobalt in place of iron. Cobaltocene is much more sensitive to oxidation than ferrocene. Cobalt carbonyl (Co_{2}(CO)_{8}) is a catalyst in carbonylation and hydrosilylation reactions. Vitamin B_{12} (see below) is an organometallic compound found in nature and is the only vitamin that contains a metal atom. An example of an alkylcobalt complex in the otherwise uncommon +4 oxidation state of cobalt is the homoleptic complex tetrakis(1-norbornyl)cobalt(IV) (Co(^{−}_{1}norb)_{4}), a transition metal-alkyl complex that is notable for its resistance to β-hydrogen elimination, in accord with Bredt's rule. The cobalt(III) and cobalt(V) complexes [Li(THF)_{4}]^{+}[Co(^{−}_{1}norb)_{4}]^{−} and [Co(^{−}_{1}norb)_{4}]^{+}[BF_{4}]^{−} are also known.

== Isotopes ==
^{59}Co is the only stable cobalt isotope and the only isotope that exists naturally on Earth. Twenty-two radioisotopes have been characterized: the most stable, ^{60}Co, has a half-life of 5.2714 years; ^{57}Co has a half-life of 271.81 days; ^{56}Co has a half-life of 77.24 days; and ^{58}Co has a half-life of 70.84 days. All the other radioactive isotopes of cobalt have half-lives shorter than 18 hours, and in most cases shorter than 1 second. This element also has 4 meta states, all of which have half-lives shorter than 15 minutes.

The isotopes of cobalt range from ^{50}Co to ^{78}Co. The primary decay mode for isotopes with atomic masses less than that of the only stable isotope, ^{59}Co, is electron capture and the primary mode of decay in isotopes with atomic mass greater than that is beta decay. The primary decay products below ^{59}Co are element 26 (iron) isotopes; above that the decay products are element 28 (nickel) isotopes.

The ^{59}Co nucleus is detectable using nuclear magnetic resonance and has a magnetic quadrupole moment. Among all NMR active nuclei, ^{59}Co has the largest chemical shift range and the chemical shift can be correlated with the spectrochemical series. Resonances are observed over a range of 20000 ppm, the width of the signals being up to 20 kHz. A widely used standard is potassium hexacyanocobaltate (0.1 M K_{3}Co(CN)_{6} in D_{2}O), which, due to its high symmetry, has a rather small line width. Systems of low symmetry can yield broadened signals to an extent that renders the signals unobservable in fluid phase NMR, but still observable in solid state NMR.

== Etymology ==
Many different stories about the origin of the word "cobalt" have been proposed. Cobalt may derive from kobalos (κόβαλος), an ancient Greek sprite. Or it may derive from kobelt, the name which 16th century German silver miners had given to a nuisance type of ore which occurred that was corrosive and issued poisonous gas. That poison may have been arsenic and the severe ill effects were blamed on "supernatural spirits and goblins kobolds, from which the word cobalt is ultimately derived".

== History ==
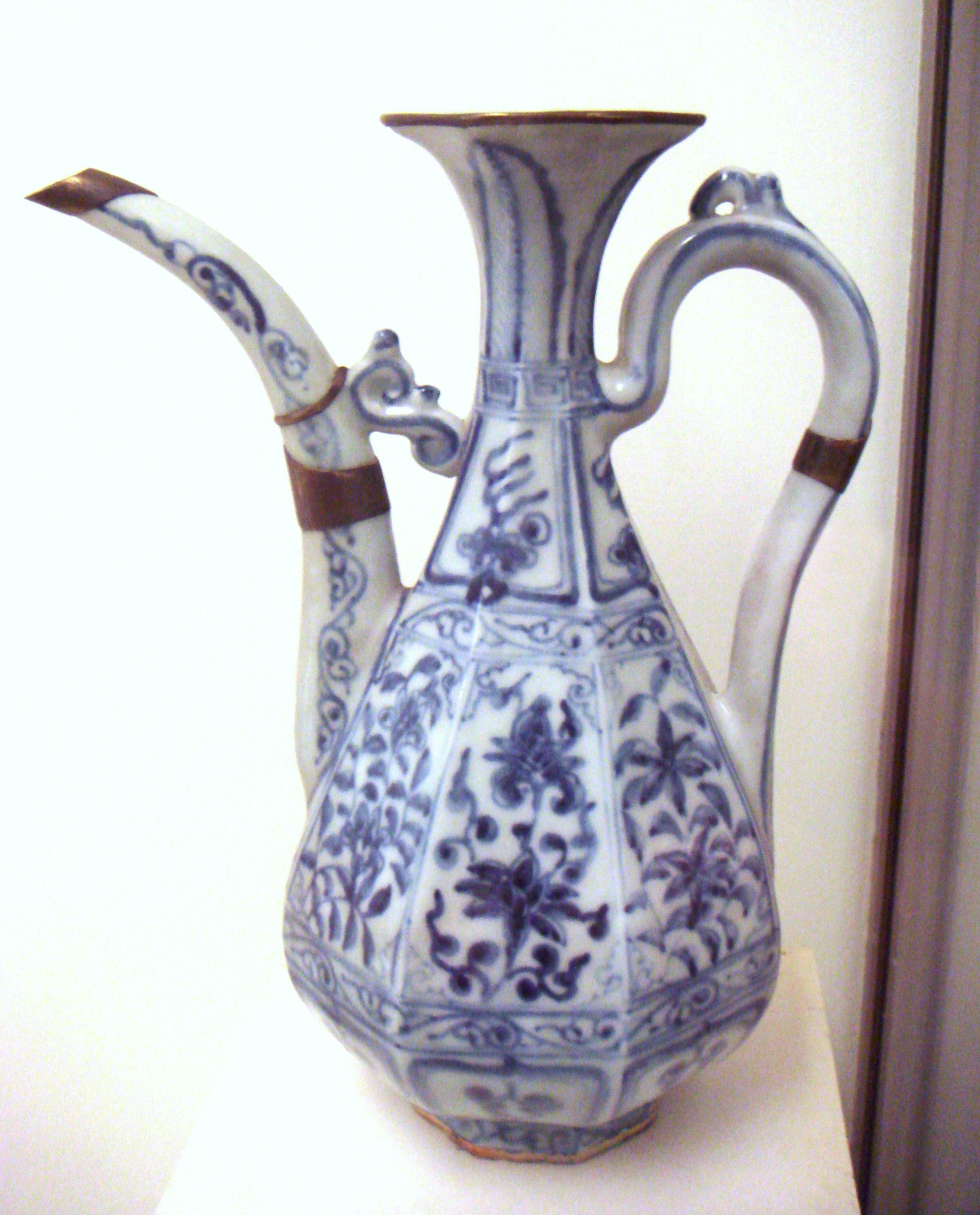
Early Chinese blue and white porcelain, manufactured c. 1335

Cobalt compounds have been used for centuries to impart a rich blue color to glass, glazes, and ceramics. Cobalt has been detected in Egyptian sculpture, Persian jewelry from the third millennium BC, in the ruins of Pompeii, destroyed in 79 AD, and in China, dating from the Tang dynasty (618–907 AD) and the Ming dynasty (1368–1644 AD).

Cobalt has been used to color glass since the Bronze Age. The excavation of the Uluburun shipwreck yielded an ingot of blue glass, cast during the 14th century BC. Blue glass from Egypt was either colored with copper, iron, or cobalt. The oldest cobalt-colored glass is from the eighteenth dynasty of Egypt (1550–1292 BC). The Egyptians sourced this cobalt from cobaltiferous alums found in Egypt's Western Oases.

One possible origin of the word cobalt is the 16th century German "kobald", a type of ore. The first attempts to smelt those ores for copper or silver failed, yielding simply powder (cobalt(II) oxide) instead. Because the primary ores of cobalt always contain arsenic, smelting the ore oxidized the arsenic into the highly toxic and volatile arsenic oxide, adding to the notoriety of the ore. Paracelsus, Georgius Agricola, and Basil Valentine all referred to such silicates as "cobalt".

Swedish chemist Georg Brandt (1694–1768) is credited with discovering cobalt c. 1735, showing it to be a previously unknown element, distinct from bismuth and other traditional metals. Brandt called it a new "semi-metal", naming it for the mineral from which he had extracted it. He showed that compounds of cobalt metal were the source of the blue color in glass, which previously had been attributed to the bismuth found with cobalt. Cobalt became the first metal to be discovered since the pre-historical period. All previously known metals (iron, copper, silver, gold, zinc, mercury, tin, lead and bismuth) had no recorded discoverers.

During the 19th century, a significant part of the world's production of cobalt blue (a pigment made with cobalt compounds and alumina) and smalt (cobalt glass powdered for use for pigment purposes in ceramics and painting) was carried out at the Norwegian Blaafarveværket. The first mines for the production of smalt in the 16th century were located in Norway, Sweden, Saxony and Hungary. With the discovery of cobalt ore in New Caledonia in 1864, the mining of cobalt in Europe declined. With the discovery of ore deposits in Ontario, Canada, in 1904 and the discovery of even larger deposits in the Katanga Province in the Congo in 1914, mining operations shifted again. When the Shaba conflict started in 1978, the copper mines of Katanga Province nearly stopped production. The impact on the world cobalt economy from this conflict was smaller than expected: cobalt is a rare metal, the pigment is highly toxic, and the industry had already established effective ways for recycling cobalt materials. In some cases, industry was able to change to cobalt-free alternatives.

In 1938, John Livingood and Glenn T. Seaborg discovered the radioisotope cobalt-60. This isotope was famously used at Columbia University in the 1950s to establish parity violation in radioactive beta decay.

After World War II, the US wanted to guarantee the supply of cobalt ore for military uses (as the Germans had been doing) and prospected for cobalt within the US. High purity cobalt was highly sought after for its use in jet engines and gas turbines. An adequate supply of the ore was found in Idaho near Blackbird canyon. Calera Mining Company started production at the site.

Cobalt demand has further accelerated in the 21st century as an essential constituent of materials used in rechargeable batteries, superalloys, and catalysts. It has been argued that cobalt will be one of the main objects of geopolitical competition in a world running on renewable energy and dependent on batteries, but this perspective has also been criticised for underestimating the power of economic incentives for expanded production.

== Occurrence ==
The stable isotope of cobalt is produced in supernovae through the r-process. It comprises 0.0029% of the Earth's crust where it is frequently associated with nickel. Both are characteristic components of meteoric iron, though cobalt is much less abundant in iron meteorites than nickel. As with nickel, cobalt in meteoric iron alloys may have been well enough protected from oxygen and moisture to remain as the free (but alloyed) metal. In the ocean cobalt typically reacts with chlorine.

Cobalt in compound form occurs in copper and nickel minerals. It is the major metallic component that combines with sulfur and arsenic in the sulfidic cobaltite (CoAsS), safflorite (CoAs_{2}), glaucodot ((Co,Fe)AsS), and skutterudite (CoAs_{3}) minerals. The mineral cattierite is similar to pyrite and occurs together with vaesite in the copper deposits of Katanga Province. When it reaches the atmosphere, weathering occurs; the sulfide minerals oxidize and form pink erythrite ("cobalt glance": Co_{3}(AsO_{4})_{2}·8H_{2}O) and spherocobaltite (CoCO_{3}). Small amounts of cobalt compounds are found in most rocks, soils, plants, and animals.

Free cobalt (the native metal) was reported from samples in the Kola Superdeep Borehole and in Moon rocks from the Luna 24 mission, possibly as a result of impacts.

Cobalt is also a constituent of tobacco smoke. The tobacco plant readily absorbs and accumulates heavy metals like cobalt from the surrounding soil in its leaves. These are subsequently inhaled during tobacco smoking.

== Production ==
Cobalt production

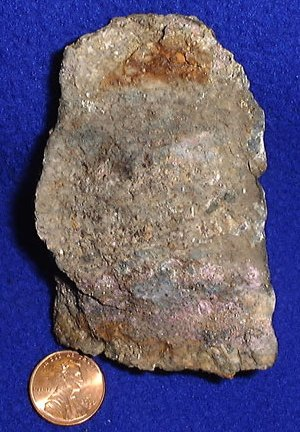
Cobalt ore

Cobalt mine production (2022) and reserves in tonnes according to USGS
Country	Production	Reserves
DR Congo	130,000	4,000,000
Indonesia	10,000	600,000
Russia	8,900	250,000
Australia	5,900	1,500,000
Canada	3,900	220,000
Cuba	3,800	500,000
Philippines	3,800	260,000
Madagascar	3,000	100,000
Papua New Guinea	3,000	47,000
Turkey	2,700	36,000
Morocco	2,300	13,000
China	2,200	140,000
United States	800	69,000
Other countries	5,200	610,000
World total	190,000	8,300,000

The main ores of cobalt are cobaltite, erythrite, glaucodot and skutterudite (see above), but most cobalt is obtained by reducing the cobalt by-products of nickel and copper mining and smelting.

Since cobalt is generally produced as a by-product, the supply of cobalt depends to a great extent on the economic feasibility of copper and nickel mining in a given market. Demand for cobalt was projected to grow 6% in 2017.

Primary cobalt deposits are rare, such as those occurring in hydrothermal deposits, associated with ultramafic rocks, typified by the Bou-Azzer district of Morocco. At such locations, cobalt ores are mined exclusively, albeit at a lower concentration, and thus require more downstream processing for cobalt extraction.

Several methods exist to separate cobalt from copper and nickel, depending on the concentration of cobalt and the exact composition of the used ore. One method is froth flotation, in which surfactants bind to ore components, leading to an enrichment of cobalt ores. Subsequent roasting converts the ores to cobalt sulfate, and the copper and the iron are oxidized to the oxide. Leaching with water extracts the sulfate together with the arsenates. The residues are further leached with sulfuric acid, yielding a solution of copper sulfate. Cobalt can also be leached from the slag of copper smelting.

The products of the above-mentioned processes are transformed into the cobalt oxide (Co_{3}O_{4}). This oxide is reduced to metal by the aluminothermic reaction or reduction with carbon in a blast furnace.

World production trend

== Extraction ==
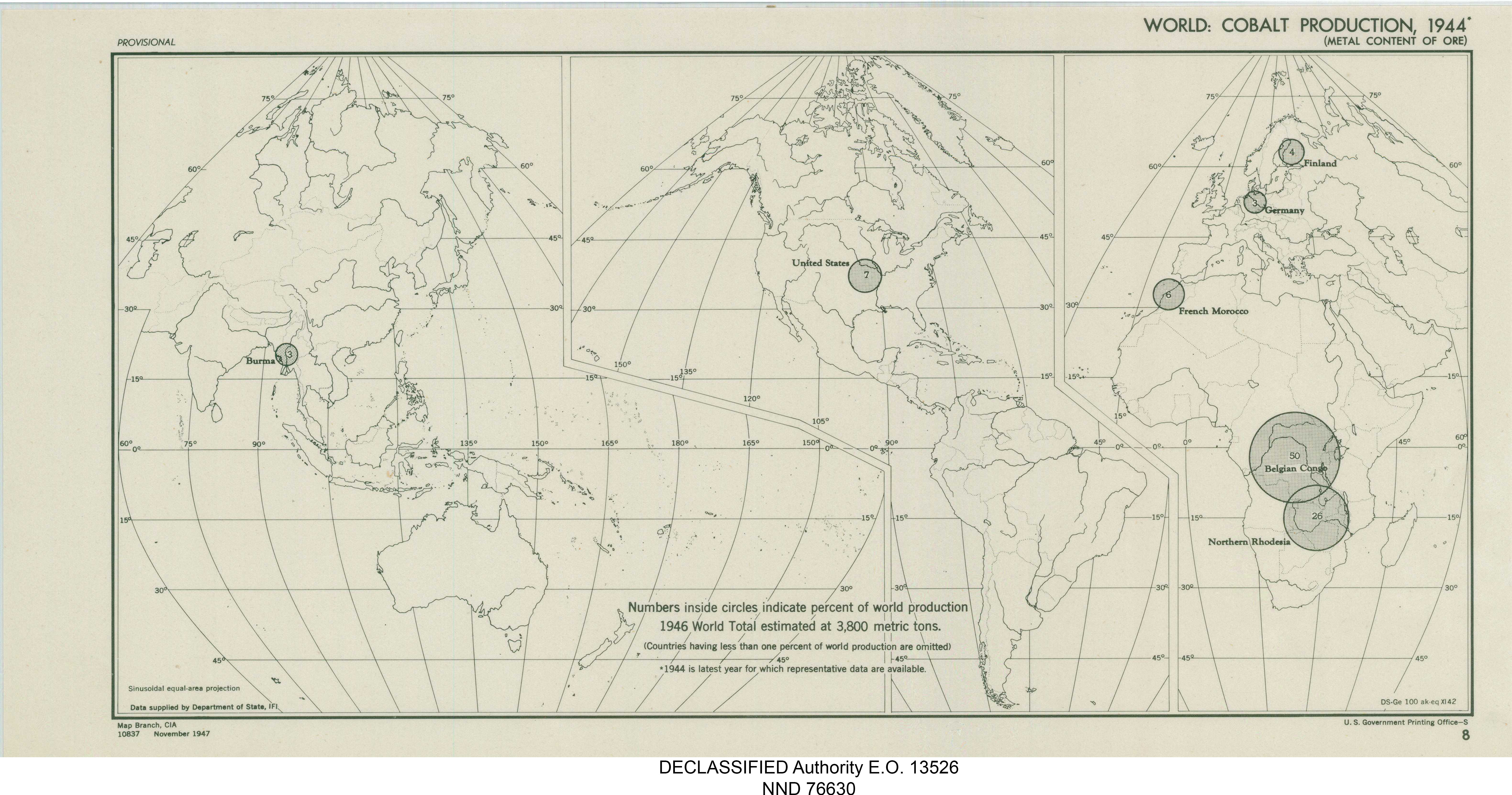
World cobalt production, 1944

The United States Geological Survey estimates world reserves of cobalt at 11,000,000 metric tons. The Democratic Republic of the Congo (DRC) currently produces 63% of the world's cobalt. This market share may reach 73% by 2025 if planned expansions by mining producers like Glencore Plc take place as expected. Bloomberg New Energy Finance has estimated that by 2030, global demand for cobalt could be 47 times more than it was in 2017.

=== Democratic Republic of the Congo ===
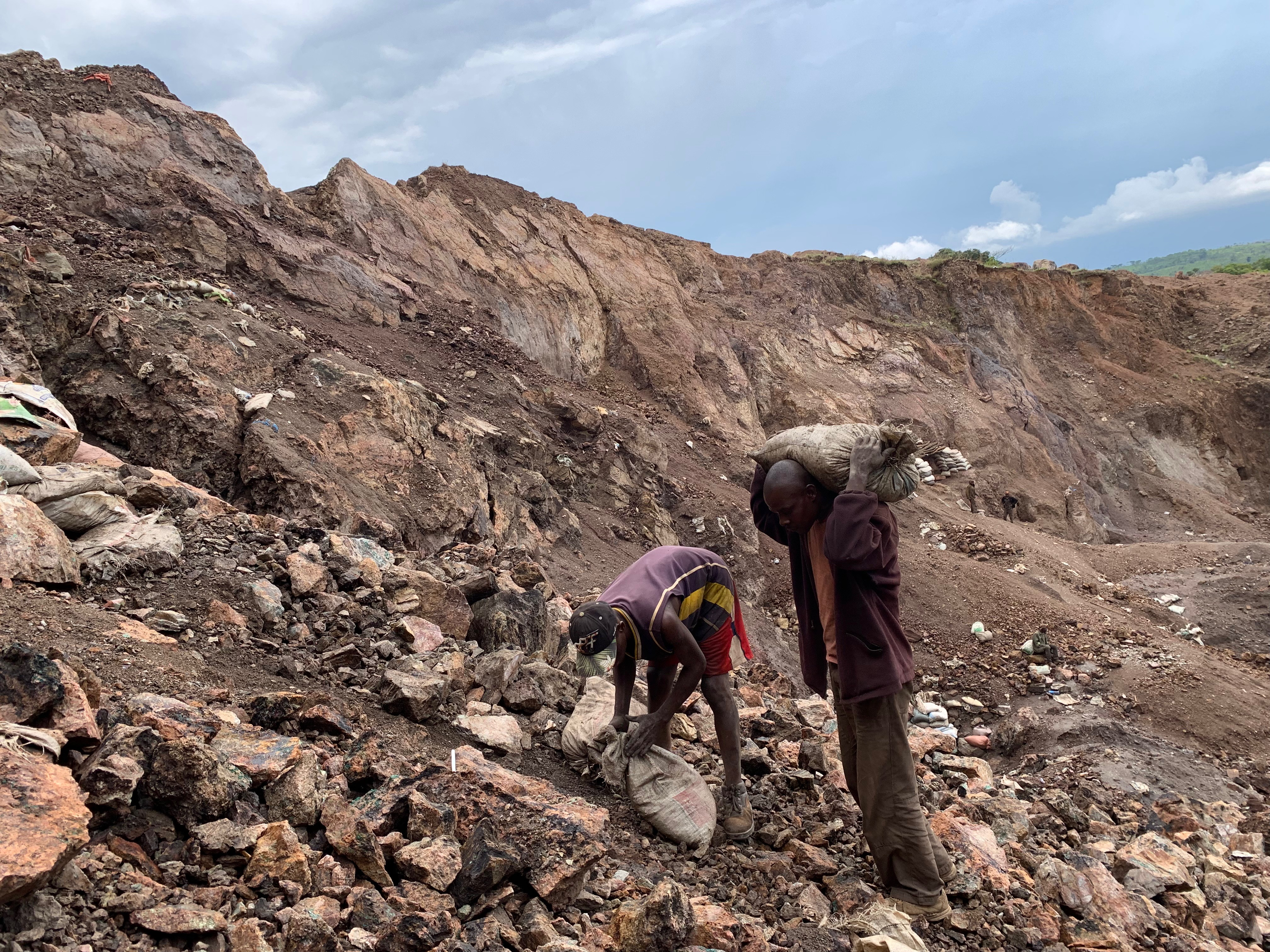
Miners collecting cobalt in the Democratic Republic of the Congo

In February 2018, global asset management firm AllianceBernstein defined the DRC as economically "the Saudi Arabia of the electric vehicle age", due to its cobalt resources, as essential to the lithium-ion batteries that drive electric vehicles.

On 9 March 2018, President Joseph Kabila updated the 2002 mining code, increasing royalty charges and declaring cobalt and coltan "strategic metals".

In February 2025, the DRC implemented a four-month suspension of cobalt exports, citing an oversupply of the metal amid a price decline to its lowest level in 21 years. Cobalt, a key byproduct of copper mining, is an essential material in battery technology. The DRC accounts for approximately 75 percent of the global supply. Within the country, the China Molybdenum Company (CMOC) dominates the industry, contributing roughly 40 percent of the world's cobalt production. Over the past year, CMOC has significantly increased its output, doubling production from two of its mines in the DRC from 56,000 tonnes to 114,000 tonnes.

==== Labor conditions ====
Artisanal mining supplied 17% to 40% of the DRC production as of 2016. Some 100,000 cobalt miners in Congo DRC use hand tools to dig hundreds of feet, with little planning and fewer safety measures, say workers and government and NGO officials, as well as The Washington Post reporters' observations on visits to isolated mines. The lack of safety precautions frequently causes injuries or death. Mining pollutes the vicinity and exposes local wildlife and indigenous communities to toxic metals thought to cause birth defects and breathing difficulties, according to health officials.

Child labor is used in mining cobalt from African artisanal mines. Human rights activists have highlighted this and investigative journalism reporting has confirmed it. This revelation prompted cell phone maker Apple Inc., on 3 March 2017, to stop buying ore from suppliers such as Zhejiang Huayou Cobalt who source from artisanal mines in the DRC, and begin using only suppliers that are verified to meet its workplace standards. In 2023, Apple announced it would convert to using recycled cobalt by 2025 and as of 2026, according to their own press release, all batteries designed by Apple are made with 100 percent recycled cobalt.

There is a push globally by the EU and major car manufacturers (OEM) for global production of cobalt to be sourced and –produced sustainably, responsibly and traceability of the supply chain. Mining companies are adopting and practising ESG initiatives in line with OECD Guidance and putting in place evidence of zero to low carbon footprint activities in the supply chain production of lithium-ion batteries. These initiatives are already taking place with major mining companies, artisanal and small-scale mining companies (ASM). Car manufacturers and battery manufacturer supply chains: Tesla, VW, BMW, BASF and Glencore are participating in several initiatives, such as the Responsible Cobalt Initiative and Cobalt for Development study. In 2018 BMW Group in partnership with BASF, Samsung SDI and Samsung Electronics have launched a pilot project in the DRC over one pilot mine, to improve conditions and address challenges for artisanal miners and the surrounding communities.

The political and ethnic dynamics of the region have in the past caused outbreaks of violence and years of armed conflict and displaced populations. This instability affected the price of cobalt and also created perverse incentives for the combatants in the First and Second Congo Wars to prolong the fighting, since access to diamond mines and other valuable resources helped to finance their military goals—which frequently amounted to genocide—and also enriched the fighters themselves. While DR Congo has in the 2010s not recently been invaded by neighboring military forces, some of the richest mineral deposits adjoin areas where Tutsis and Hutus still frequently clash, unrest continues although on a smaller scale and refugees still flee outbreaks of violence.

Cobalt extracted from small Congolese artisanal mining endeavors in 2007 supplied a single Chinese company, Congo DongFang International Mining. A subsidiary of Zhejiang Huayou Cobalt, one of the world's largest cobalt producers, Congo DongFang supplied cobalt to some of the world's largest battery manufacturers, who produced batteries for ubiquitous products like the Apple iPhones. Because of accused labour violations and environmental concerns, LG Chem subsequently audited Congo DongFang in accordance with OECD guidelines. LG Chem, which also produces battery materials for car companies, imposed a code of conduct on all suppliers that it inspects.

In December 2019, International Rights Advocates, a human rights NGO, filed a landmark lawsuit against Apple, Tesla, Dell, Microsoft and Google company Alphabet for "knowingly benefiting from and aiding and abetting the cruel and brutal use of young children" in mining cobalt. The companies in question denied their involvement in child labour. In 2024 the court ruled that the suppliers facilitate force labor but the US tech companies are not liable because they don't operate as a shared enterprise with the suppliers and that the "alleged injuries are not fairly traceable" to any of the defendants' conduct. The book Cobalt Red alleges that workers including children suffer injuries, amputations, and death as the result of the hazardous working conditions and mine tunnel collapses during artisanal mining of cobalt in the DRC.

Since child and slave labor have been repeatedly reported in cobalt mining, primarily in the artisanal mines of DR Congo, technology companies seeking an ethical supply chain have faced shortages of this raw material and the price of cobalt metal reached a nine-year high in October 2017, more than US$30 a pound, versus US$10 in late 2015. After oversupply, the price dropped to a more normal $15 in 2019. As a reaction to the issues with artisanal cobalt mining in DR Congo a number of cobalt suppliers and their customers have formed the Fair Cobalt Alliance (FCA) which aims to end the use of child labor and to improve the working conditions of cobalt mining and processing in the DR Congo. Members of FCA include Zhejiang Huayou Cobalt, Sono Motors, the Responsible Cobalt Initiative, Fairphone, Glencore and Tesla, Inc.

=== Canada ===
In 2017, some exploration companies were planning to survey old silver and cobalt mines in the area of Cobalt, Ontario, where significant deposits are believed to lie.

Cobalt mined in Canada is a by-product of nickel mining. Even so, in 2023 the country produced more than 5,000 tons of cobalt (43% is mined in Newfoundland and Labrador, the rest in Ontario, Manitoba and Quebec). Exports of cobalt and cobalt products totaled $568 million in 2023.

=== Cuba ===
Canada's Sherritt International processes cobalt ores in nickel deposits from the Moa mines in Cuba, and the island has several others mines in Mayarí, Camagüey, and Pinar del Río. Continued investments by Sherritt International in Cuban nickel and cobalt production while acquiring mining rights for 17–20 years made the communist country third for cobalt reserves in 2019, before Canada itself.

=== Indonesia ===
Starting from smaller amounts in 2021, Indonesia began producing cobalt as a byproduct of nickel production. By 2022, the country had become the world's second-largest cobalt producer, with Benchmark Mineral Intelligence forecasting Indonesian output to make up 20 percent of global production by 2030. Cobalt production increased from 1,300 tons to 20,500 tons between 2015 and 2024 due to the Indonesian government's strategic initiative to develop a robust domestic supply chain for electric vehicles. An export ban in 2020 has ensured an influx of foreign investment in nickel and cobalt processing in the country.

== Applications ==
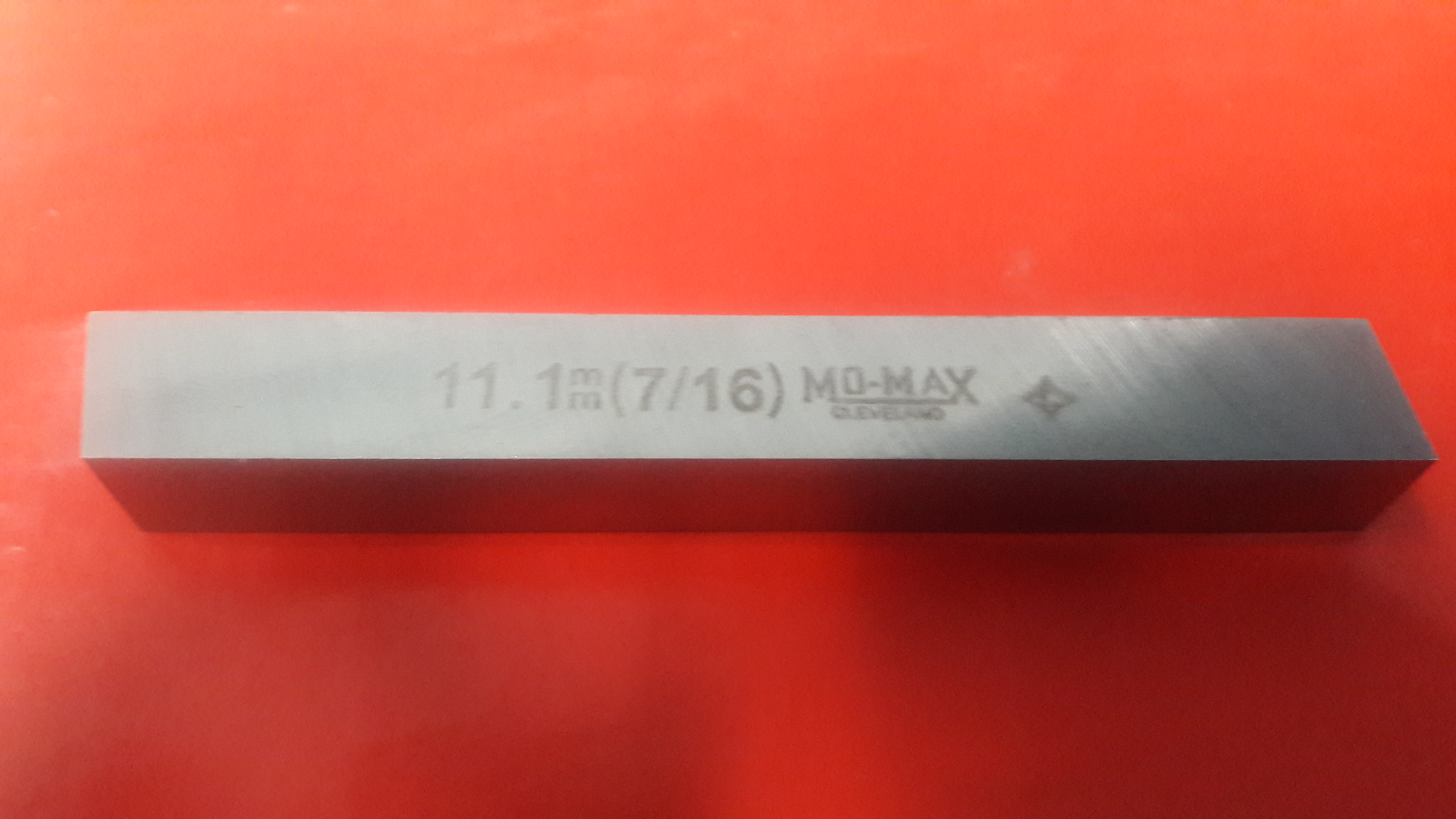
High-speed steel tool tip containing cobalt

Globally, the largest uses for cobalt are the electrodes for rechargeable batteries and in production of high-performance alloys. In 2016, 116,000 tonnes (128,000 short tons) of cobalt was used.

=== Alloys ===
Cobalt steel alloys contain cobalt for increased heat and wear resistance. The temperature stability of cobalt-based superalloys makes them suitable for turbine blades for gas turbines and aircraft jet engines, although nickel-based single-crystal alloys surpass them in performance.

In addition to structural and magnetic roles, cobalt alloys are critical in aerospace-grade electrical components. They are used in connectors, thermal switches, and microsensors that must endure extreme temperatures, vibration, and radiation—conditions typical in satellites, fighter aircraft, and hypersonic systems. These alloys maintain conductivity and mechanical integrity even under fluctuating mission-critical loads.

The development of wear-resistant cobalt alloys started in the first decade of the 20th century with the stellite alloys, containing chromium with varying quantities of tungsten and carbon. Alloys with chromium and tungsten carbides are very hard and wear-resistant. Special cobalt-chromium-molybdenum alloys like Vitallium are used for prosthetic parts (hip and knee replacements). Cobalt alloys are also used for dental prosthetics as a useful substitute for nickel, which may be allergenic.

The special alloys of aluminium, nickel, cobalt and iron, known as Alnico, and of samarium and cobalt (samarium–cobalt magnet) are used in permanent magnets. It is also alloyed with 95% platinum for jewelry, yielding an alloy suitable for fine casting, which is also slightly magnetic.

=== Batteries ===
Lithium cobalt oxide (LiCoO_{2}, aka "LCO"), first sold commercially in 1991 by Sony, was widely used in lithium-ion battery cathodes until the 2010s. The material is composed of cobalt oxide layers with the lithium intercalated. These LCO batteries continue to dominate the market for consumer electronics. Batteries for electric cars however have shifted to lower cobalt technologies.

In 2018 most cobalt in batteries was used in a mobile device, a more recent application for cobalt is rechargeable batteries for electric cars. This industry increased five-fold in its demand for cobalt from 2016 to 2020, which made it urgent to find new raw materials in more stable areas of the world. Demand is expected to continue or increase as the prevalence of electric vehicles increases. Exploration in 2016–2017 included the area around Cobalt, Ontario, an area where many silver mines ceased operation decades ago. Cobalt for electric vehicles increased 81% from the first half of 2018 to 7,200 tonnes in the first half of 2019, for a battery capacity of 46.3 GWh.

As of August 2020 battery makers have gradually reduced the cathode cobalt content from 1/3 (NMC 111) to 1/5 (NMC 442) to currently 1/10 (NMC 811) and have also introduced the cobalt free lithium iron phosphate cathode into the battery packs of electric cars such as the Tesla Model 3. Research was also conducted by the European Union into the possibility of eliminating cobalt requirements in lithium-ion battery production. In September 2020, Tesla outlined their plans to make their own, cobalt-free battery cells.

Nickel–cadmium (NiCd) and nickel metal hydride (NiMH) batteries also included cobalt to improve the oxidation of nickel in the battery. Lithium iron phosphate batteries officially surpassed ternary cobalt batteries in 2021 with 52% of installed capacity. Analysts estimate that its market share will exceed 60% in 2024.

=== Catalysts ===
Several cobalt compounds are oxidation catalysts. Cobalt acetate is used to convert xylene to terephthalic acid, the precursor of the bulk polymer polyethylene terephthalate. Typical catalysts are the cobalt carboxylates (known as cobalt soaps). They are also used in paints, varnishes, and inks as drying agents through the oxidation of drying oils. However, their use is being phased out due to toxicity concerns. In the European Union, cobalt bis(2-ethylhexanoate) (cobalt octoate), a primary paint drier, falls under the harmonised classification of 2-ethylhexanoic acid and its salts as toxic for reproduction (Repr. 1B, H360D), which has applied since 23 November 2023. The same carboxylates are used to improve the adhesion between steel and rubber in steel-belted radial tires. In addition they are used as accelerators in polyester resin systems.

Cobalt-based catalysts are used in reactions involving carbon monoxide. Cobalt is also a catalyst in the Fischer–Tropsch process for the hydrogenation of carbon monoxide into liquid fuels. Hydroformylation of alkenes often uses cobalt octacarbonyl as a catalyst. The hydrodesulfurization of petroleum uses a catalyst derived from cobalt and molybdenum. This process helps to clean petroleum of sulfur impurities that interfere with the refining of liquid fuels.

=== Pigments and coloring ===
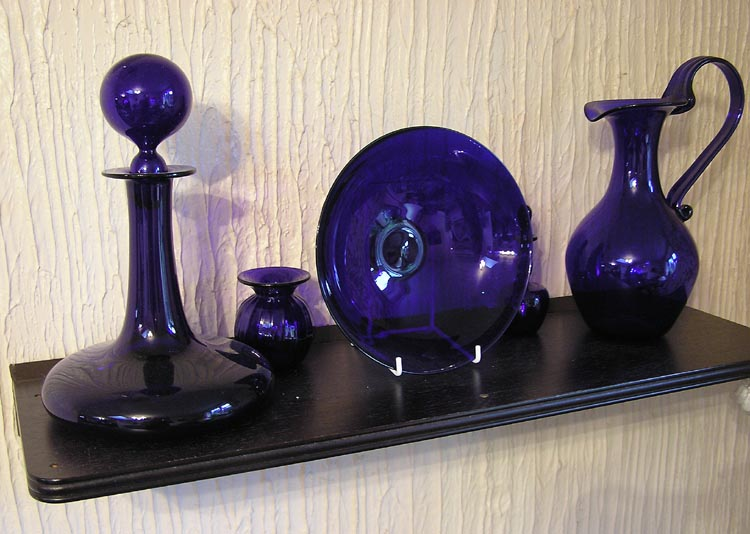
Cobalt blue glass

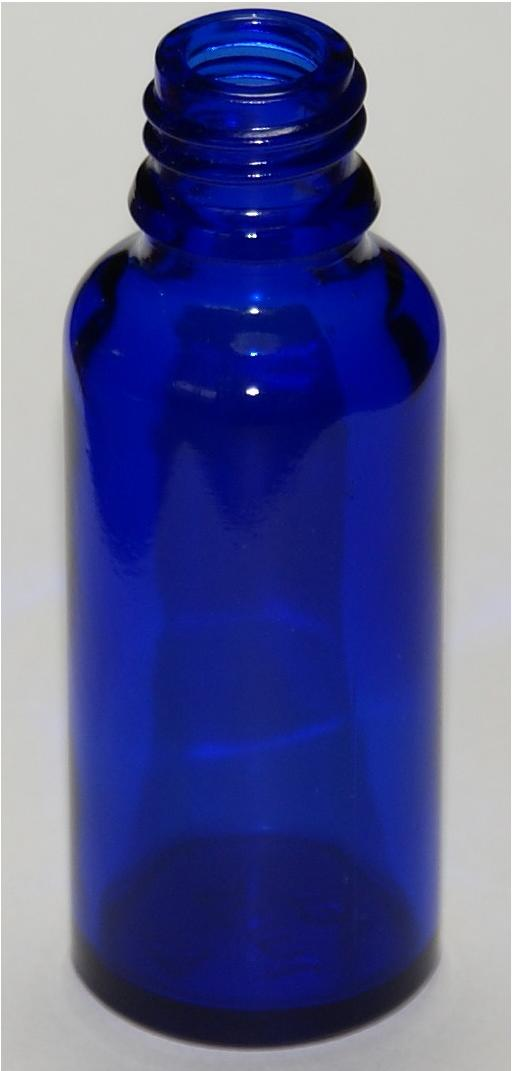
Cobalt-colored glass

Before the 19th century, cobalt was predominantly used as a pigment. It has been used since the Middle Ages to make smalt, a blue-colored glass. Smalt is produced by melting a mixture of roasted mineral smaltite, quartz and potassium carbonate, which yields a dark blue silicate glass, which is finely ground after the production. Smalt was widely used to color glass and as pigment for paintings. In 1780, Sven Rinman discovered cobalt green, and in 1802 Louis Jacques Thénard discovered cobalt blue. Cobalt pigments such as cobalt blue (cobalt aluminate), cerulean blue (cobalt(II) stannate), various hues of cobalt green (a mixture of cobalt(II) oxide and zinc oxide), and cobalt violet (cobalt phosphate) are used as artist's pigments because of their superior chromatic stability.

=== Radioisotopes ===
Cobalt-60 (Co-60 or ^{60}Co) is useful as a gamma-ray source because it can be produced in predictable amounts with high activity by bombarding cobalt with neutrons. It produces gamma rays with energies of 1.17 and 1.33 MeV.

Cobalt-60 is used in external beam radiotherapy, sterilization of medical supplies and medical waste, radiation treatment of foods for sterilization (cold pasteurization), industrial radiography (e.g. weld integrity radiographs), density measurements (e.g. concrete density measurements), and tank fill height switches. The metal has the unfortunate property of producing a fine dust, causing problems with radiation protection. Cobalt from radiotherapy machines has been a serious hazard when not discarded properly, and one of the worst radiation contamination accidents in North America occurred in 1984, when a discarded radiotherapy unit containing cobalt-60 was mistakenly disassembled in a junkyard in Juarez, Mexico.

Cobalt-60 has a radioactive half-life of 5.27 years. Loss of potency requires periodic replacement of the source in radiotherapy and is one reason why cobalt machines have been largely replaced by linear accelerators in modern radiation therapy. Cobalt-57 (Co-57 or ^{57}Co) is a cobalt radioisotope most often used in medical tests, as a radiolabel for vitamin B_{12} uptake, and for the Schilling test. Cobalt-57 is used as a source in Mössbauer spectroscopy and is one of several possible sources in X-ray fluorescence devices.

Nuclear weapon designs could intentionally incorporate ^{59}Co, some of which would be activated in a nuclear explosion to produce ^{60}Co. The ^{60}Co, dispersed as nuclear fallout, is sometimes called a cobalt bomb.

=== Magnetic materials ===
Due to the ferromagnetic properties of cobalt, it is used in the production of various magnetic materials. It is used in creating permanent magnets like Alnico magnets, known for their strong magnetic properties used in electric motors, sensors, and MRI machines. It is also used in production of magnetic alloys like cobalt steel, widely used in magnetic recording media such as hard disks and tapes.

Cobalt's ability to maintain magnetic properties at high temperatures makes it valuable in magnetic recording applications, ensuring reliable data storage devices. Cobalt also contributes to specialized magnets such as samarium-cobalt magnets, which are vital in electronics for components like sensors and actuators.

=== Other uses ===
- Cobalt is used in electroplating for its attractive appearance, hardness, and resistance to oxidation.
- It is also used as a base primer coat for porcelain enamels.

== Biological role ==
Cobalt is essential to the metabolism of all animals. It is a key constituent of cobalamin, also known as vitamin B_{12}, the primary biological reservoir of cobalt as an ultratrace element. Bacteria in the stomachs of ruminant animals convert cobalt salts into vitamin B_{12}, a compound which can only be produced by bacteria or archaea. A minimal presence of cobalt in soils therefore markedly improves the health of grazing animals, and an uptake of 0.20 mg/kg a day is recommended, because they have no other source of vitamin B_{12}.

Proteins based on cobalamin use corrin to hold the cobalt. Coenzyme B_{12} features a reactive C-Co bond that participates in the reactions. In humans, B_{12} has two types of alkyl ligand: methyl and adenosyl. MeB_{12} promotes methyl (−CH_{3}) group transfers. The adenosyl version of B_{12} catalyzes rearrangements in which a hydrogen atom is directly transferred between two adjacent atoms with concomitant exchange of the second substituent, X, which may be a carbon atom with substituents, an oxygen atom of an alcohol, or an amine. Methylmalonyl coenzyme A mutase (MUT) converts MMl-CoA to Su-CoA, an important step in the extraction of energy from proteins and fats.

Although far less common than other metalloproteins (e.g. those of zinc and iron), other cobaltoproteins are known besides B_{12}. These proteins include methionine aminopeptidase 2, an enzyme that occurs in humans and other mammals that does not use the corrin ring of B_{12}, but binds cobalt directly. Another non-corrin cobalt enzyme is nitrile hydratase, an enzyme in bacteria that metabolizes nitriles.

=== Cobalt deficiency ===
In humans, consumption of cobalt-containing vitamin B_{12} meets all needs for cobalt. For cattle and sheep, which meet vitamin B_{12} needs via synthesis by resident bacteria in the rumen, there is a function for inorganic cobalt. In the early 20th century, during the development of farming on the North Island Volcanic Plateau of New Zealand, cattle suffered from what was termed "bush sickness". It was discovered that the volcanic soils lacked the cobalt salts essential for the cattle food chain. The "coast disease" of sheep in the Ninety Mile Desert of the Southeast of South Australia in the 1930s was found to originate in nutritional deficiencies of trace elements cobalt and copper. The cobalt deficiency was overcome by the development of "cobalt bullets", dense pellets of cobalt oxide mixed with clay given orally for lodging in the animal's rumen.

Cobalamin

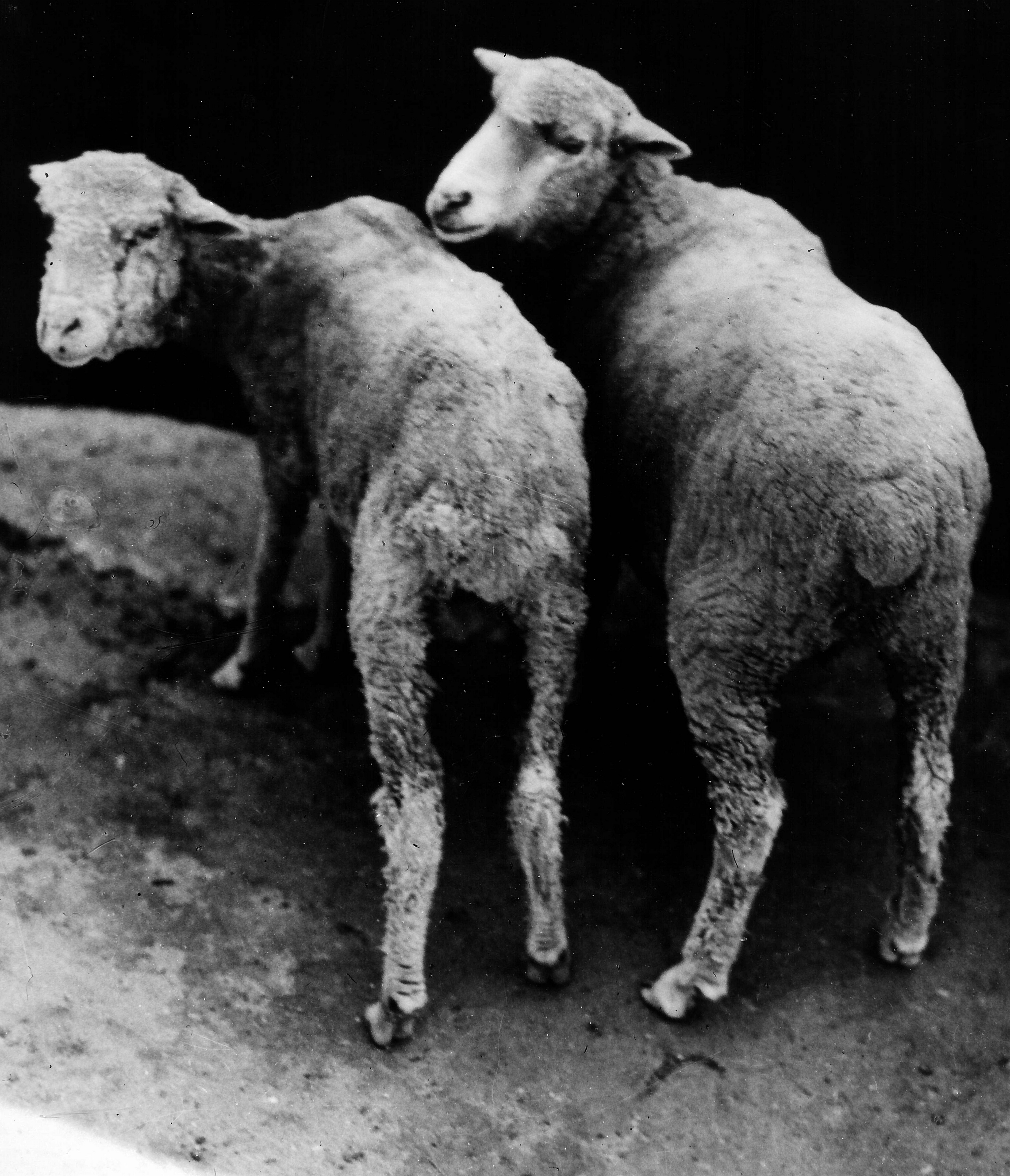
Cobalt-deficient sheep

== Toxicity ==
The LD_{50} value for soluble cobalt salts has been estimated to be between 150 and 500 mg/kg. Thus, for a 100 kg person the LD_{50} would be about 20 grams. Cobaltism (cobalt poisoning) is rare but has resulted from the fabrication of tungsten carbide. Another source is from wear and tear of certain metal-on-metal hip prostheses.

Chronic cobalt ingestion has caused serious health problems at doses far less than the lethal dose. In 1966, the addition of cobalt compounds to stabilize beer foam in Canada led to a peculiar form of toxin-induced cardiomyopathy, which came to be known as beer drinker's cardiomyopathy.

Cobalt metal is suspected of causing cancer (i.e., possibly carcinogenic, IARC Group 2B) as per the International Agency for Research on Cancer (IARC) Monographs.

It causes respiratory problems when inhaled. It also causes skin problems when touched; after nickel and chromium, cobalt is a major cause of contact dermatitis.
