= Frohbergite =

Mineral of the simple telluride class

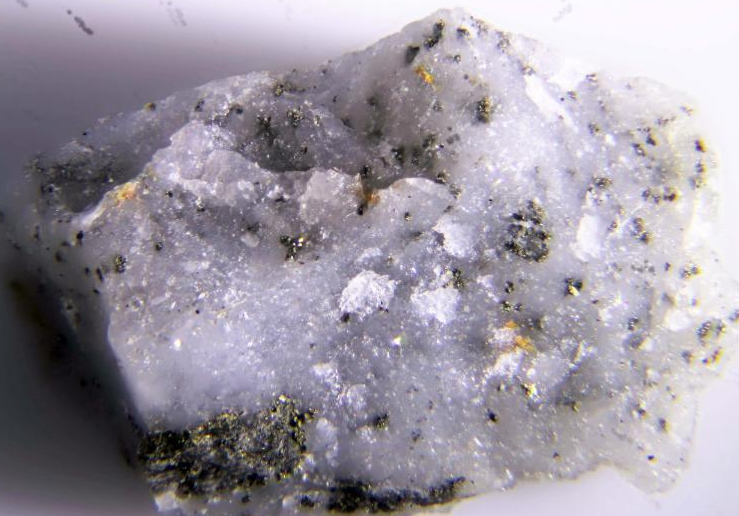
- Frohbergite (Arizona)

General
- Category: Telluride (sulfosalt) mineral
- Formula: FeTe_{2}
- IMA symbol: Frb
- Strunz classification: 2.EB.10a
- Crystal system: Orthorhombic
- Crystal class: sulphide

Identification
- Color: white with a lilac or pinkish tint
- Crystal habit: in the form of a thin border or small inclusions
- Cleavage: the mineral is fragile
- Mohs scale hardness: 3-4, up to 4.5
- Luster: metallic
- Diaphaneity: opaque
- Density: 8.057 (calculated); 8.055 (measured)
- Pleochroism: extremely weak.

Frohbergite (German: Frohbergit, title by proper name: Max Hans Frohberg) or iron telluride is a rare hydrothermal mineral from the sulfide class, in composition — iron telluride with the ideal formula FeTe_{2} (contains 82.05% tellurium and 17.95% iron).

Frohbergite occurs in tellurium-rich veins of hydrothermal deposits, sometimes as a thin rim on the periphery of chalcopyrite or as inclusions in native gold, petzite or chalcopyrite. It belongs to the marcasite group and forms a mineral line with mattagamite. Frohbergite most often occurs as fine-grained aggregates.

== Discovery history and name ==
Frohbergite was first identified by Thompson in 1947 in the telluride-rich portion of the Robb-Montbray Mine in Quebec, Canada, which was then considered the only known occurrence of the mineral for nearly three decades. That same year, Thompson synthesized an artificial compound of the composition FeTe_{2} for control purposes. In terms of the features of the crystal structure and optical properties in polished sections, it turned out to be identical or similar to natural frohbergite.

Frohbergite was found in polished sections as a rim up to 15 μ wide around chalcopyrite at the contact with altaite (PbTe), native gold and melonite. Associated minerals include tellurobismuthite, petzite, pyrite, marcasite, chalcopyrite, covellite etc. For a long time, frohbergite was observed only in polished sections as a fine-grained aggregate, so its macroscopic features remained unstudied.

The mineral was named in honor of the Canadian geologist and mineralogist of German origin, Dr. Max Hans Frohberg (1901–1970, Toronto, Canada).

== Properties ==
External image
- Frohbergite (Cochise County, Arizona)

Frohbergite is a mineral of orthorhombic syngony, dipyramidal. The crystal structure is similar to that of marcasite. The mineral is brittle, the hardness fluctuates between 3 and 4 on the Mohs scale.

Based on its chemical formula and crystal structure, the mineral was initially assigned to the marcasite group, where it forms a continuous mineral line with mattagamite. Moreover, frohbergite and mattagamite respectively represent the extreme members of a series of solid natural solutions FeTe_{2} → CoTe_{2}.

According to another classification proposed in the 1970s by the Bulgarian mineralogist Ivan Kostov, plumbotellurides of gold, copper, iron and silver (Au—Сu—Fe—Ag) were assigned to the bilibinskite group, as the most common mineral. Frohbergite was not assigned to this group directly, but its closeness to it was noted, it was established that plumbotellurides, rich in metal content, partially fill the gap in composition between pure tellurides (kostovite AuCuTe_{4}, sylvanite AuAgTe_{4}, frohbergite FeTe_{2}, rickardite Cu_{5}Те_{3}, altaite PbTe) and minerals in the gold-copper system (Au—Сu).

Most often, frohbergite occurs as fine-grained aggregates, the mineral is opaque, the color on the polished section is whitish with a bluish or pinkish tint, the luster is metallic, the mineral is strongly anisotropic: from red-orange to ink-blue. In a polished section, the hue of frohbergite is reddish-pink, which distinguishes it from the similar, but yellowish-pink melonite (NiTe_{2}). The anisotropy is indistinct. Bireflection ranges from orange-red to the color of blue ink. X-ray examination of a microscopic sample showed its identity with the artificially produced compound FeTe_{2}. In terms of immediate visual impression, the color of frohbergite is very similar to the main variety of germanite from the Tsumeb deposit (Namibia), differing from it in lightness (germanite R is 25%, and frohbergite is 55%) and lower saturation of chromatic tone.

Several iron tellurides were synthesized experimentally for crystallographic and chemical comparison. At temperatures below 519 °C, only two mineraloid compounds were stable: β-FeTe_{0,9} and, properly, FeTe_{2} (frohbergite).

Hydrochloric acid, potassium cyanide, iron trichloride, caustic potash and corrosive sublimate do not act on polished frohbergite. Diluted nitric acid (1:1) causes rapid boiling until a black spot is formed.

In its lilac hue and high relief, frohbergite resembles some minerals of the linnaeite-gersdorffite group. In isolated samples, frohbergite was sometimes confused with pyrrhotite. Frohbergite differs from the latter in its increased reflectivity and significantly lower saturation of the color tone, in which the bluish component noticeably predominates. With crossed nicols, the anisotropy of pyrrhotite is more pronounced, but the color effect is absent.

Frohbergite differs little from gersdorffite in optical properties, especially since the main distinguishing feature — optical anisotropy of frohbergite - cannot always be detected due to the extremely fine-grained structure of its aggregates. In addition, gersdorffite often has anomalous anisotropy.

== Mineral formation ==
External image
- Frohbergite (one crystal)

Frohbergite occurs in many tellurium-rich hydrothermal massive sulfide deposits, and is sometimes isolated as a thin rim on the periphery of chalcopyrites or as inclusions in native gold, petzite, or chalcopyrite together with other related tellurides. In particular, at the Robb Montbray type deposit, frohbergite was found in thin sections together with altaite, tellurobismuthite, montbrayite, melonite and petzite. Associated minerals were native gold, chalcopyrite, pyrite, sphalerite, marcasite, native tellurium, chalcocite, and covellite. Frohbergite segregations were observed mainly in the form of a thin, sometimes discontinuous, reaction rim surrounding chalcopyrite inclusions in tellurides. The rim consisted of an aggregate of frohbergite grains, almost isometric in size and shape, in which an even thinner rim of native tellurium almost always developed along the direct contact with chalcopyrite.

It is obvious that frohbergite is present in the ores of the Zodskoye deposit, however, due to the very small size of the segregations and the extreme similarity of the optical characteristics of frohbergite and gersdorffite, it was not possible to more definitely clarify the diagnosis of the mineral in the 1960s. In the USSR in the 1970s, frohbergite was found in the Ozernoye (Murmansk region, Northern Karelia, including in Finland) and Altyn-Tash (in the Chelyabinsk region) gold deposits, as well as in the Zhana-Tyube gold mines (Kazakhstan). There are more than a dozen deposits around the world where frohbergite has been reliably identified.

== See also ==
- Tellurides
- Avicennite
- Djerfisherite
- Calaverite
- Krennerite
- Bezsmertnovite
- Volynskite
- Bilibinskite
- Nagyágite

== Publications ==
- Tengnér, S. (1938) Über diselenide und ditelluride von eisen, kobalt und nickel. Zeitschrift für Anorganische und Allgemeine Chemie: 239: 126–132.
- Thompson, R.M. (1947) Frohbergite, FeTe_{2}, a new member of the marcasite group. Contributions to Canadian Mineralogy, University of Toronto Studies, Geological Series: 51: 35–40.
- Hurlbut, C.S. (1947) Proceedings of the twenty-seventh annual meeting of the Mineralogical Society of America at Chicago, Illinois. American Mineralogist: 32: 189–214.
- Fleischer, M. (1947) New mineral names. American Mineralogist: 32: 483–485.
- Thompson, R.M. (1947) Frohbergite, FeTe_{2}, a new member of the marcasite group. Contributions to Canadian Mineralogy, University of Toronto Studies, Geological Series: 51: 35–40.
- Thompson, R.M. (1949) The telluride minerals and their occurrence in Canada. American Mineralogist, 34 (5–6) 341-382
- Bezsmertnaya M. S., Logikova L. A., Soboleva L. N. (1969) Determination of tellurides under a microscope. — Moscow: Nauka. — 175 p. (in Russian)
- Rucklidge, J. (1969) Frohbergite, montbrayite and a new PbBBi telluride. The Canadian Mineralogist: 9: 709–716.
- Brostigen, G., Kjekshus, A., Rømming, Chr., Gronowitz, Salo, Koskikallio, Jouko, Swahn, Carl-Gunnar (1973) Compounds with the Marcasite Type Crystal Structure. VIII. Redetermination of the Prototype. Acta Chemica Scandinavica, 27. 2791–2796
- Ramdohr, P., Udubasa, G. (1973) Frohbergit-vorkommen in den Goldenlagerstaetten von Sacaramb und Fata Baii (Rumaenien) (Occurrence of frohbergite in gold ore deposit sites of Sacaramb and Fata-Baii (Romania)). Mineralium Deposita: 8(2): 179–182.
- Pertlik, F. (1986) Strukturverfeinerung der synthetischen Verbindung FeTe_{2} (Frohbergit). Anzeiger der Österreichischen Akademie der Wissenschaften Mathematisch-Natur Wissenschaftliche Klasse: 123: 123–125.
- Lutz, H.D., Muller, B. (1991) Lattice vibration spectra. LXVIII. Single-crystal Raman spectra of marcasite-type iron chalcogenides and pnictides, FeX_{2} (X=S,Se,Te;P,As,Sb). Physics and Chemistry of Minerals: 18: 265–268.
