= Montbrayite =

Polymetallic plumbo-telluride mineral

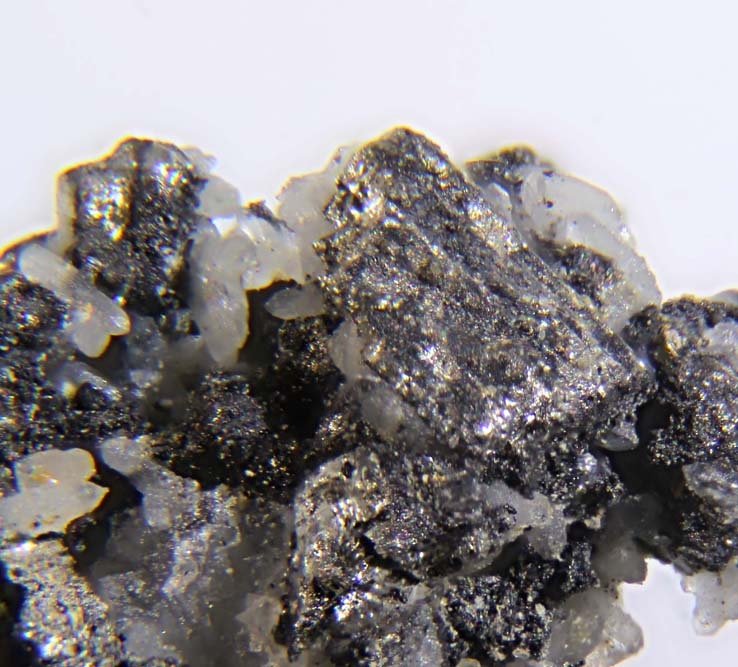
- Montbrayite (Montbray, Quebec)

General
- Category: Sulfosalt minerals
- Formula: (Au,Ag,Sb,Bi,Pb)_{23}(Te,Sb,Bi,Pb)_{38} or (Au,Sb)_{2}Te_{3}
- IMA symbol: Mnb
- Strunz classification: 2.DB.20
- Crystal system: Triclinic
- Crystal class: Plumbo-telluride

Identification
- Color: cream, yellowish white, very light yellow
- Crystal habit: small segregations, rarely exceeding 3-5 mm, crystals very rare
- Twinning: observed
- Cleavage: very good {110}, {011}, {111}
- Fracture: irregular to uneven, sub-conchoidal, the mineral is very fragile
- Tenacity: very brittle
- Mohs scale hardness: 2.5
- Luster: metallic
- Diaphaneity: opaque
- Density: 9.94 (measured)
- Pleochroism: very weak

Montbrayite (from a Canadian toponym) is a very rare mineral from among the gold tellurides, close to krennerite and calaverite, in composition it is a mixed polymetallic plumbo-telluride of gold with a variable formula, initially written as Au_{2}Te_{3}, or (Au,Sb)_{2}Te_{3}, but today having a much more complex form in the calculated form: (Au,Ag,Sb,Bi,Pb)_{23}(Te,Sb,Bi,Pb)_{38}. The color of montbrayite is cream, tin-white to pale yellow, the luster is metallic.

== Discovery history and name ==
The mineral was first identified in 1946 by M. A. Peacock and R. M. Thompson at the Canadian Robb Montbray deposit (Quebec). Almost immediately, it was analyzed and a description of montbrayite was published as a new gold telluride with the formula Au_{2}Te_{3}. The mineral was named after the location of its discovery, the typical Canadian Montbray deposit, which remained the only one for montbrayite for the next quarter of a century.

== Properties ==
Montbrayite forms small segregations, rarely exceeding 3–5 mm, the mineral is dense, usually homogeneous, very brittle, the fracture is flat-conchoidal, sometimes discontinuous separation is observed. The hardness of montbrayite is low, which is quite common for tellurides, it is about 2.5 on the Mohs scale. The specific gravity is about 9.94. The luster is metallic, on chips it gradually oxidizes and becomes cloudy, the color is tin-white to pale yellow. The polished surface is creamy-white, similar to that of krennerite; but not as white as altaite.

The mineral formula was initially defined as Au_{2}Te_{3} or (Au,Sb)_{2}Te_{3}, but more accurate analyses revealed that in different cases constant impurities are part of the montbrayite. Several formula variants are fixed in the calculated form, in particular, one of the variants concerns samples from the Robb Montbray type deposit and looks like (Au_{1.73}Bi_{0.10}Sb_{0.06}Pb_{0.06}Ag_{0.04})_{Σ=1.99}Te_{3.00}.

Where montbrayite does not contain tellurobismuthite or altaite inclusions, its structure is generally homogeneous. Bireflection is barely noticeable. Anisotropy is weak to moderate, shades: light gray, light yellow-brown, bluish-gray.

Very similar minerals: calaverite, krennerite and montbrayite are difficult to distinguish under a microscope. A good way to determine this is by testing for microhardness. Another feature: montbrayite is characterized by a mosaic structure. In addition, montbrayite sometimes forms twins. When exposed to HNO_{3} (in a 1:1 dilution), a kind of etching occurs, it boils strongly, bubbles form and yellow-brown spots of released gold remain on the surface of the mineral. With more saturated nitric acid (dilution 3:2) the reaction is less violent, the stain is light brown and small round halos are formed, also colored light brown; with concentrated nitric acid it boils weakly, and the surface is colored uniformly grayish-brown; round halos are not observed. Other reagents (HCl, KCN, FeCl_{3}, KOH and HgCl) do not affect the mineral.

Calaverite and montbrayite are among the earliest tellurides to form; they have relatively high microindentation hardness values, increased relief, and a pronounced tendency toward idiomorphism and the formation of coarse-crystalline varieties. The reflectivity of montbrayite is noticeably higher than that of calaverite; R_{g} of montbrayite almost completely repeats the R_{ср} curve of krennerite. In terms of reflectivity values in yellow light, relief, microindentation hardness, and the forms of separation in the form of short-prismatic plates, montbrayite and calaverite are similar to melonite, differing in the presence of a pronounced pinkish tint and more perfect cleavage in melonite.

== Conditions of formation ==
External image
- Montbrayite (Delamar Mine, Nevada)

Montbrayite is a typical mineral of tellurium-gold deposits, closely associated with native gold, petzite, altaite, coloradoite, melonite and tellurobismuthite, forming rounded inclusions and veinlets in tetrahedrite and chalcopyrite. The size of fine-grained aggregates of montbrayite, as a rule, does not exceed 2.5 mm.

Unlike hessite, sylvanite and other first-row minerals, empressite (AgTe), montbrayite (Au_{2}Te_{3}) and muthmannite (AuAgTe_{2}) are among the rare gold-silver tellurides.

In the Robb-Montbray mine, montbrayite was found in association with native gold, tellurobismuthite, altaite, petzite, melonite, chalcopyrite, pyrite, sphalerite, chalcocite and marcasite. The sizes of the segregations of the corresponding gold tellurides were sometimes very large and reached 1 cm in diameter, and montbrayite was either at contacts with other gold tellurides or had the form of an inclusion in them. In places, altaite with small admixtures of gold and petzite in the form of thin fibers crossed montbrayite. Sometimes tellurobismuthite with a small amount of altaite and petzite formed rounded inclusions in montbrayite. In the latter case, a eutectoid structure was present, apparently resulting from the decomposition of tellurides. Melonite crystals, sometimes rimmed with petzite, have also been found in montbrayite.

== Mineral formation ==
External image
- Montbrayite (Robb-Montbray Mine)

For the first 25 years after the mineral's discovery, the Robb Montbray type deposit remained the only one for montbrayite, as well as for the frohbergite first found there. Montbrayite was first identified in the USSR in 1979 in Uzbekistan in the ores of the Kochbulak gold-polymetallic deposit. However, the optical properties of the Uzbek montbrayite differed significantly from the Canadian montbrayite described in 1946 by Peacock and Thompson. The first samples were found in close intergrowth with altaite, where montbrayite formed as a «shirt» on segregations of native gold of very high purity, 970. Morphologically, montbrayite was formed first, its thin strip bordered the gold segregation, and then larger segregations in intergrowth with altaite surrounded the entire gold segregation. In reflected light, the mineral had a pinkish-brown hue.

Later, montbrayite was also discovered in Russia, in the Kochkarskoye gold deposit (Chelyabinsk region, Plastovsky district). Several mines with identified montbrayite are also located in Kazakhstan (Akmola and East Kazakhstan regions).

To date, there are about two dozen gold-telluride deposits around the world in which samples of montbrayite have been found.

== See also ==
- Tellurides
- Stützite
- Sylvanite
- Nagyágite
- Frohbergite
- Calaverite
- Krennerite
- Bezsmertnovite
- Volynskite
- Bilibinskite

== Publications ==
- Palache, Charles, Harry Berman & Clifford Frondel (1944), The System of Mineralogy of James Dwight Dana and Edward Salisbury Dana Yale University 1837–1892, Volume I: Elements, Sulfides, Sulfosalts, Oxides. John Wiley and Sons, Inc., New York. 7th edition, revised and enlarged, 834 pp.: 260.
- Thompson, R.M., M.A. Peacock, J.F. Rowland, and L.G. Berry (1951) Empressite and “stuetzite”. Amer. Mineral., 36, 458–469.
- Honea, R.M. (1964) Empressite and stuetzite redefined. Amer. Mineral., 49, 325–338.
- Cabri, L.J. (1965) Discussion of “empressite and stuetzite redefined” by R.M. Honea. Amer. Mineral., 50, 795–801.
- Stumpfl, E.F. and J. Rucklidge (1968) New data on natural phases in the system Ag–Te. Amer. Mineral., 53, 1513–1522.
- Bezsmertnaya M. S., Logikova L. A., Soboleva L. N. (1969) Determination of tellurides under a microscope. — Moscow: Nauka. — 175 p. (in Russian)
- Criddle, A.J. and C.J. Stanley, Editors. (1993) Quantitative data file for ore minerals, 3rd ed. Chapman & Hall, London, 154.
- Bindi, L., P.G. Spry, and C. Cipriani (2004) Empressite, AgTe, from the Empress-Josephine mine, Colorado, U.S.A.: composition, physical properties, and determination of the crystal structure. American Mineralogist (2004): 89: 1043–1047
- Vikent’eva, O.V., Shilovskikh, V.V., Shcherbakov, V.D., Moroz, T.N., Vikentyev, I.V., Bortnikov N.S. (2023): Montbrayite from the Svetlinsk Gold–Telluride Deposit (South Urals, Russia): Composition Variability and Decomposition. Minerals, 13, 1225.
