= Volynskite =

Telluride mineral

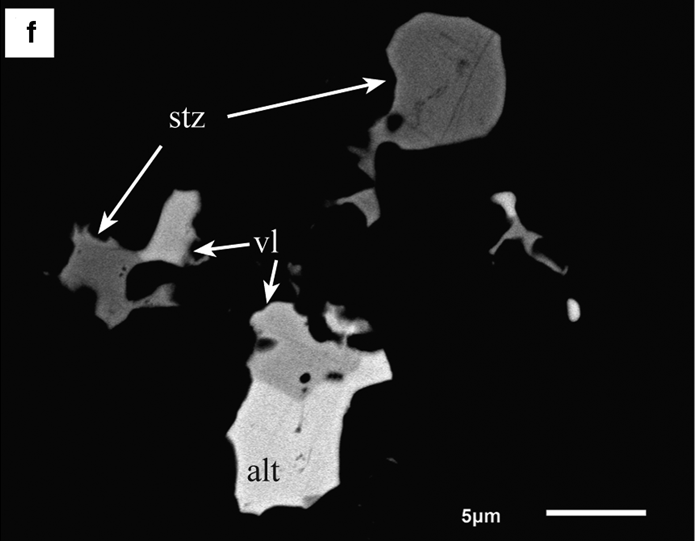
- diagram of tellurides (and volynskite) inclusions in chalcopyrite

General
- Category: Telluride (sulfosalt) mineral
- Formula: AgBiTe_{2}
- IMA symbol: Vol
- Strunz classification: 2.JA.20
- Crystal system: Trigonal
- Crystal class: Sulfides and sulfosalts

Identification
- Color: bright lead-gray, pale purplish in reflected light
- Crystal habit: microscopic grains in related minerals
- Cleavage: Perfect, one perfect, two imperfect
- Mohs scale hardness: 2.5-3
- Luster: metallic
- Diaphaneity: opaque
- Density: 8.01 (measured)
- Pleochroism: very slight in oil

Volynskite (Russian: Волынски́т), is a rare hydrothermal mineral of the sulfide class (the matildite group), that forms microscopic grains in related minerals, which in composition is a complex bismuth-silver telluride with the calculated formula AgBiTe_{2}.

Volynskite was first discovered and identified between 1960 and 1965 by Marianna Bezsmertnaya and Lada Soboleva who observed thin sections among closely related tellurides in the territory of the Zod gold deposit. It was named in honor of the late professor of mineralogy and head of the mineralogy department at the Institute of Mineralogy, Geochemistry and Crystal Chemistry of Rare Elements, Igor Volynsky, who had died suddenly in September 1962.

== Discovery history and name ==
For the first time, a new previously unknown mineral (the future volynskite) was encountered by M. S. Bezsmertnaya and Sh. O. Amirayan during a microscopic study of samples from the Sotk gold mine and was initially mistaken for wehrlite. In the course of further research conducted in 1960–1963, it was established that, based on a combination of chemical, X-ray, and optical characteristics, this mineral differs from all natural tellurium compounds described in the literature and represents a new, independent mineral species.

After three years of hard work, Marianna Bezsmertnaya recalled the first steps in identifying the new mineral: “During a microscopic study of ores from gold deposits in Armenia, M.S. Bezsmertnaya and Sh.O. Amiryan encountered a mineral in the telluride association that differed little in optical properties from tellurobismuthite, with which it was closely intergrown in the form of microscopically small inclusions. Based on optical features and qualitative chemical composition, the mineral was initially mistaken for wehrlite (pilsenite). However, the results of our subsequent detailed studies of the chemical composition, crystallographic and optical properties showed that the mineral encountered was previously unknown and had not been described by anyone.”

In 1960, when the composition of the mineral had not yet been precisely determined, studies were conducted using the local microspectral analysis method using N. V. Korolev's setup. The future volynskite was removed on one plate with tellurobismuthite, which was closely intergrown with it, and the analysis conditions for both minerals were identical. The closeness of the elemental composition of volynskite to tellurobismuthite made it possible to at least approximately estimate the content of individual elements in it.[9] Based on the results of microsample analysis, it was established that the main elements included in the composition of volynskite are silver, bismuth, and tellurium.

In the same 1960, similar studies were conducted by Z. M. Sverdlov on a microspectral setup at A.P. Karpinsky Russian Geological Research Institute (VSEGEI). The same elements were identified in the composition of the new mineral. A year later, at the personal request of Marianna Bezsmertnaya, a more detailed quantitative microspectral analysis of the future volynskite was conducted by N. V. Korolev at the State Optical Institute in Leningrad. Two closely related tellurides were used as standards for calculating the mineral formula: tellurobismuthite (Bi_{2}Te_{3}) and hessite (Ag_{2}Te). Before filing an application for registration of the new mineral, a total of 11 microspectral and 7 X-ray analyses were conducted. Based on the results of the study, the formula of volynskite was finally established as AgBiTe_{2}, close within the error limits to the synthetic compound AgBiTe_{2}.

In 1962, also at the request of researchers, an artificial compound of the composition AgBiTe_{2} was synthesized by A. Yu. Malevsky in the experimental laboratory of IMGRE from stoichiometric quantities of its three constituent elements. The synthesis was carried out for five hours at temperatures of 1000-1400 °C, followed by quenching for one and a half hours from 400° in an open furnace with free access to air. According to the chemical composition, optical and X-ray data, a fundamental similarity was noted between the low-temperature modification of AgBiTe_{2} obtained at the Institute of Semiconductors, the main phase of the compound synthesized by A. Yu. Malevsky and the mineral under study.

Specific difficulties in studying the new mineral were primarily related to the lack of any massive samples that would allow determination using qualitative analysis. As a result, the authors of the future discovery repeatedly checked and rechecked the results obtained using different methods.

In the studied samples it was possible to observe it only under a microscope in the form of inclusions up to 0.3 mm in size in tellurobismuthite in association with other tellurides, mainly altaite, and hessite. It is possible to isolate the mineral of such inclusions in samples only in quantities sufficient for microspectral and X-ray structural (by the powder diffraction method) tests. Therefore, the definition of the new mineral was based mainly on optical diagnostic features, microspectral (11 analyses) and X-ray (7 analyses) tests, the reliability of which is confirmed by the completely satisfactory convergence of the results for each type of research for the mineral described by us and the artificial compound of the composition AgBiTe_{2}.

— Marianna Bezsmertnaya, Lada Soboleva, “About Volynskite — a new telluride of bismuth and silver”, 1965

All of the above studies were conducted during the lifetime of the head of the IMGRE mineralogy department, Igor S. Volynsky, under his direct instructions and using his methods, developed in the mid-1930s and improved in the 1950s. In September 1962, Professor Volynsky died suddenly at the age of 62. The discoverers of the new mineral, his students and colleagues decided to name the mineral in his honor, posthumously. In 1964, volynskite was approved by the Commission on New Minerals at the All-Union Mineralogical Society.

Using the example of studying a new mineral, which later received the name volynskite, it was possible to draw an unambiguous conclusion about the discovery in mineralogy of a fundamentally new and previously unknown microworld, inaccessible to study by classical macro methods. The post-war experience of mineralogical research, which sharply intensified by the end of the 1950s, especially the study of ores containing rare elements, convinced domestic, primarily Moscow scientists, of the complete validity of the opinion expressed in 1956 by Kuzma Vlasov about the urgent need to develop a new branch in mineralogy — micromineralogy.

== Properties ==
External image
- Volynskite (Campbell Mine, Arizona)

The properties of volynskite follow directly from its chemical composition: it is a mixed (complex) telluride of two elements, bismuth and silver, found in ores in close intergrowths and associations with larger tellurides of silver and bismuth.

The new mineral from the Zodskoe deposit, as well as later samples from the Eastern Sayan Mountains, were discovered in the form of complex metasomatic formations located along the cleavage boundaries of tellurobismuthite (bismuth telluride) leaflets — precisely in those areas where these leaflets are saturated with a large number of inclusions of hessite and altaite (silver tellurides). All of the listed minerals had such small crystal grain sizes (less than 0.3 mm) that their mechanical isolation in quantities sufficient for study by conventional methods of precise diagnostics, such as chemical analysis, determination of specific gravity, or crystallochemical studies of single crystals, seemed impossible to researchers. As a result, the diagnostics of volynskite was repeatedly rechecked and confirmed by the data of the latest micromethods at that time: the study of optical and other physical properties in reflected light, tests on the Korolev microspectral setup, powder diffraction and careful comparison with a compound of the composition AgBiTe_{2}, artificially synthesized in the laboratory.

The results of the study showed that volynskite has clearly expressed optical properties that differ from its close analogues, due to which it was distinguished as an independent mineral species during microscopic studies. When observing polished sections with a dry objective, some similarity with tellurobismuthite was noted, primarily in reflectivity and color. To a lesser extent (upon cursory examination), volynskite is also similar to galena and petzite. However, the distinctive features of volynskite are clearly revealed when moving on to studying the mineral in oil immersion. Under these conditions, volynskite occupies an intermediate position in overall lightness between tellurobismuthite (the lightest of the compared minerals) and the pair galena-petzite (the latter is the darkest of the four listed). At the same time, the specific delicate shades of the color of the minerals are noticeably enhanced:

Tellurobismuthite — pure pink, with a noticeable predominance of the red component of the spectrum, noticeably lighter than the others;
Volynskite — pale purple, partly pinkish, but a noticeable participation of the violet component is visible;
Galenite — lilac with a predominance of violet and blue components, almost not giving the impression of pink;
Petzite — very similar to galena, but clearly more bluish, noticeably darker than the others.

All studies and measurements were carried out by L. A. Loginova in the IMGRE laboratory using the method of Igor S. Volynsky.

It was also specifically noted that the artificially synthesized compound of the same chemical composition AgBiTe_{2} has a similar pinkish-lilac hue to volynskite, but its color tone is more saturated. According to its mechanical properties, volynskite had the expected characteristics. It is well polished and, compared to other related tellurides (primarily tellurobismuthite, altaite, hessite), has a slightly increased relief.

The cleavage of the mineral is perfect in one direction, although not always evident, and imperfect in the other two directions. As a consequence of the variable nature of the cleavage, triangles are formed when the mineral is chipped (as in galena), although the described effect is quite rare, occurring in isolated cases.

Volynskite has very weak anisotropy, ranging from pale pink to grey. Bireflection and pleochroism are also very weak, barely visible.

According to Evgeny Zavyalov, published in 1985, volynskite is isostructural to bogdanovite.

== Genesis and deposits ==
External image
- Volynskite in pyrite (Cochise, Arizona)

The genesis of volynskite microcrystals is determined by a pronounced hydrothermal metasomatic nature. Its form and composition depend entirely on the associated and accompanying minerals. For example, at the typical Sotk gold mine, volynskite is found only in contact reaction zones within tellurobismuthite leaflets saturated with altaite and hessite inclusions; galena and freislebenite are often also present.

Despite its rarity and microscopic size, volynskite can nevertheless be called a very common mineral. It is found in almost all known gold deposits rich in tellurium and tellurides. Even before its final establishment and registration, in addition to the Zodskoye deposit, a mineral close to volynskite in optical properties and paragenesis was discovered by Marianna Bezsmertnaya in the ores of a deposit in the Eastern Sayan, where it was found in the form of inclusions less than 0.05 mm in size. in its usual association with tellurobismuthite and altaite.

In 1972, volynskite was discovered and described by E. A. Markova in the Central section of the Kochbulak deposit (Tajik SSR). Similar finds occurred later, in the early 1980s, when microsegregations of volynskite were found in association with pyrite, fahlores, native gold and hessite. The Kochbulak volynskite is characterized by paragenesis with altaite, much less often it is associated with hessite, sulfosalts of silver, copper, lead or bismuth and tin minerals. The chemical composition of the Kochbulak volynskite, determined on an electronic microanalyzer, corresponded to the proportional formula Ag_{1.16}Bi_{0.90}Te_{1.93}.

In 1978, at the Zhana-Tyube deposit in Kazakhstan, Ernst Spiridonov and Tatyana Chvileva were the first to identify tellurobismuthite and volynskite with high antimony content (characterized as “antimony volynskite”).

In the late 1980s, volynskite was also identified and registered in India, in the Kolar gold field (Champion Reef mine zone at a depth of about one and a half thousand meters). The obtained sample of the mineral was characterized by metasomatic, in the development environment among galena and numerous inclusions of altaite, to which elongated volynskite segregations of 10 to 20x70 μm (microns) were confined.

In the early 2000s, volynskite micrograins were found in many low-sulfide epithermal deposits of the Kola Peninsula and Northern Karelia, both in the Murmansk Region and in Finland (Pohjois-Karjala). There, it also forms among similar tellurides with a species-forming role of silver and gold: empressite, hessite, stützite and petzite, appearing in association with pyrrhotite and galena (and sometimes even replacing galena), as well as in intergrowths with altaite in pyrite.

Polymineral aggregates composed of tellurides — sylvanite, petzite, hessite, altaite, as well as the rarer volynskite, tellurobismuthite and melonite — were noted in the mid-2010s at tellurium gold deposits in Chukotka. In particular, volynskite was discovered as part of drop-shaped telluride aggregates in bornite.

In total, volynskite has been found in more than fifty gold and polymetallic deposits with high tellurium content worldwide.

== See also ==
- Bezsmertnovite
- Semenovite
- Avicennite
- Bilibinskite
- Bogdanovite
- Chvilevaite
- Frohbergite

== Publications ==
- Bezsmertnaya M. S., Soboleva L. N. (1963) New bismuth silver telluride detected by novel micromethods. — Moscow: Publishing House of the Academy of Sciences CCCP, 1963. Proceedings of IMGRE, issue 18. (in Russian)
- Fleischer, M. (1964) New mineral names. American Mineralogist, 49, 816-821 (818). <as unnamed silver bismuth telluride (publication before the mineral was named)>
- Pinsker Z. G., Imamov R.N. (1964) Electron diffraction studies of the AgBiTe_{2} compound. Soviet Physics - Crystallography: Volume 9, pp. 277–280. (in Russian)
- Bezsmertnaya M. S., Soboleva L. N. (1965) About Volynskite — a new telluride of bismuth and silver. In the collection: Experimental and methodological studies of ore minerals. Dedicated to the memory of prof. Igor S. Volynsky. Editors in Chief M. S. Bezsmertnaya and V. G. Feklichev. — Moscow: Nauka, 1965. — 304 p. (in Russian)
- Fleischer, Michael (1966) New Mineral Names. American Mineralogist, 51 (3–4) 529-534
- Markova E. A. (1967) Occurrence of volynskite in a gold deposit of Central Asia. — Moscow: Notes of the Russian Mineralogical Society, vol. 96, pp. 324–326. (in Russian)
- Harris, D. C., Sinclair, W. D., Thorpe, R. I. (1973) Telluride minerals from the Ashley Deposit, Bannockburn Township, Ontario. The Canadian Mineralogist, 12 (1) 137-143
- Khamrabaeva Z., Turesebekov A.K. (1980) Composition of volynskite from Kochbulak (Central Tien Shan). — Uzbek Geological Journal, Vol. 2, pp. 24–26.
- Shimada, N., Miyahisa, M., & Hirowatari, F. (1981). Melonite and volynskite from the Yokozuru mine, Sannotake, North Kyushu, Japan. — Mineralogical Journal, 10(6), 269–278.
- Zavyalov E. N. (1985) Isostructural nature of bogdanovite and volynskite. — Moscow: Notes of the Russian Mineralogical Society, vol. 114, pp. 434–440. (in Russian)
- Bayliss, Peter (1991) Crystal chemistry and crystallography of some minerals in the tetradymite group. — American Mineralogist, 76 (1–2) 257-265
