= Weissite =

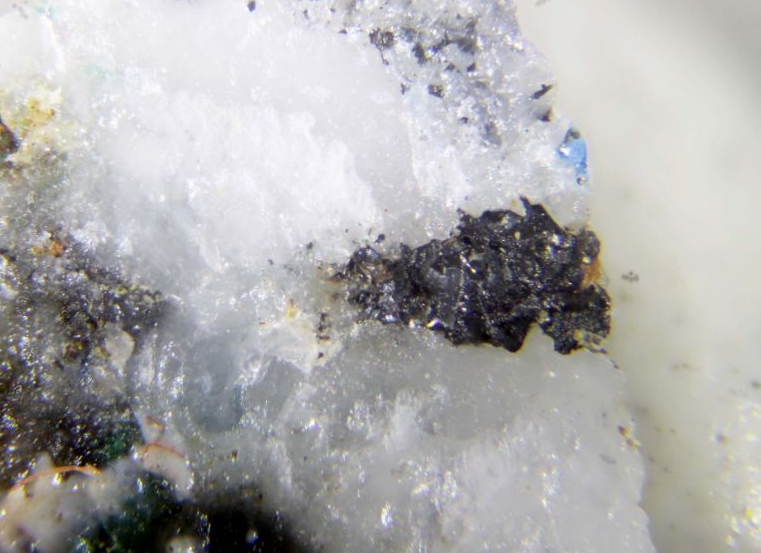

General
- Category: Telluride mineral
- Formula: Cu_{2−x}Te
- IMA symbol: Wst
- Strunz classification: 2.BA.30
- Crystal system: Hexagonal
- Crystal class: Dihexagonal dipyramidal (6mmm); H-M symbol: (6/m 2/m 2/m)
- Space group: P6/mmm
- Unit cell: a = 12.54, c = 21.71 [Å]; Z = 15

Identification
- Color: Bluish black to black with tarnish
- Crystal habit: Lens shaped masses
- Cleavage: None
- Fracture: Uneven
- Mohs scale hardness: 3
- Luster: Metallic
- Streak: Black
- Diaphaneity: Opaque
- Specific gravity: 6
- Birefringence: Distinct
- Pleochroism: Distinct

Weissite is a telluride mineral, a copper telluride. Its chemical formula is Cu_{2−x}Te. Weissite has hexagonal crystal structure. Its specific gravity is 6 and its Mohs hardness is 3. Occurrence is in Gunnison County, Colorado, Arizona and New Mexico in the United States. It is also reported from Kalgoorlie, Western Australia and Dalarna and Värmland, Sweden.

Weissite occurs in hydrothermal deposits associated with pyrite, native tellurium, sylvanite, petzite, rickardite, native sulfur, native gold, calaverite and krennerite.

It was first described in 1927 for an occurrence in the Good Hope Mine in the Vulcan District of Gunnison County, Colorado. It was named for mine owner Louis Weiss.

== See also ==
- Rickardite
