= Nagyágite =

Sulfide mineral

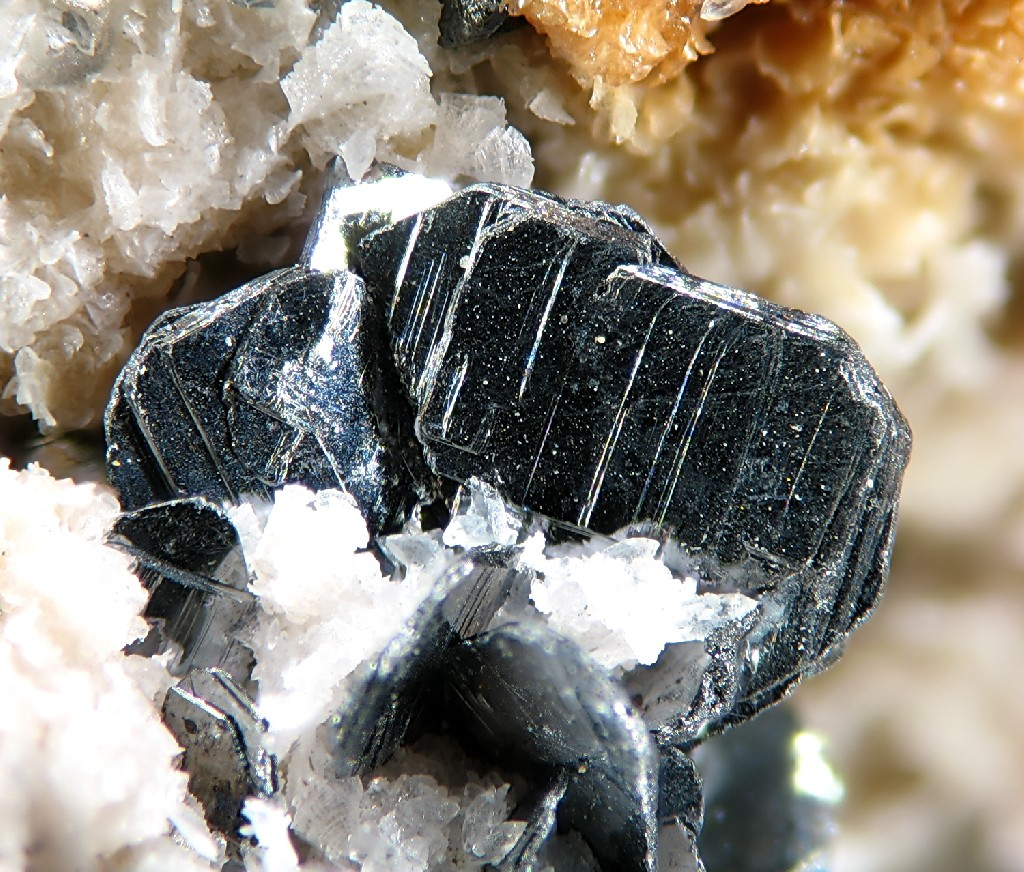
- Nagyágite from Nagyág (Săcărâmb), Romania (image width: 1.5 mm)

General
- Category: Sulfosalt mineral
- Formula: Pb_{5}Au(Te,Sb)}_{4}S_{(5–8)} or AuPb(Sb,Bi)Te_{(2–3)}S_{6} or (Te,Au)Pb(Pb,Sb)S_{2}
- IMA symbol: Ngy
- Strunz classification: 2.HB.20a
- Dana classification: 02.11.10.01
- Crystal system: Monoclinic
- Crystal class: Prismatic (2/m) (same H-M symbol)
- Space group: P2_{1}/m

Identification
- Colour: Blackish lead-grey; pale grey in polished section
- Crystal habit: Tabular crystals (often bent), also massive granular, pseudotetragonal
- Twinning: Crossed twin lamellae observed on (001) sections
- Cleavage: Perfect on {010}, excellent on {101}
- Fracture: Hackly
- Tenacity: Flexible, slightly malleable
- Mohs scale hardness: 1.5
- Lustre: Metallic, bright on fresh cleavage
- Streak: Blackish lead-grey
- Diaphaneity: Opaque
- Specific gravity: 7.35–7.49
- Pleochroism: Weak

Nagyágite (Pb_{5}Au(Te,Sb)_{4}S_{(5–8)}) is a rare sulfide mineral with known occurrence associated with gold ores. Nagyágite crystals are opaque, monoclinic and dark grey to black coloured.

It was first described in 1845 for an occurrence at the type locality of the Nagyág mine, Săcărâmb, Hunedoara County, Romania.

It occurs in gold–tellurium epithermal hydrothermal veins. Minerals associated with nagyágite include: altaite, petzite, stutzite, sylvanite, tellurantimony, coloradoite, krennerite, native arsenic, native gold, proustite, rhodochrosite, arsenopyrite, sphalerite, tetrahedrite, calaverite, tellurobismuthite, galena and pyrite.
