= Tellurium copper =

Alloy

Tellurium copper is an alloy of copper and tellurium. Tellurium improves the machinability of copper.

== Overview ==
Tellurium is usually added to copper to improve machinability ("free cutting"). ASTM specification B301 has 0.5% tellurium; at concentrations of up to 0.75% machinability is improved while electrical conductivity and hot working behavior is maintained. Mechanical properties are similar to tough pitch copper, while machinability is similar to brass - the hardness of the alloy is increased by precipitation of the copper telluride: weissite.

Tellurium copper is not suited to welding, but it can be welded with gas shielded arc welding or resistance welding. It can be readily soft soldered, silver soldered, or brazed.

Tellurium copper can be used as the electrode in electrical discharge machining (EDM) - the alloy is used to replace copper when grinding wheel loading occurs during fine finishing of the electrode - the alloy retains the properties of copper in the EDM process.

== Phase diagram ==
Copper forms tellurides. These include Cu_{4}Te, Cu_{2}Te (m.p. 1125 °C), and CuTe. A eutectic forms at 71% (mol) Te, (m.p. 340 °C). Between 4.3 and 30% (mol) Te there is stratification between Cu and Cu_{2}Te.
