= Cripple Creek & Victor Gold Mine =

Open pit mine near Victor, Colorado, US

Cripple Creek & Victor
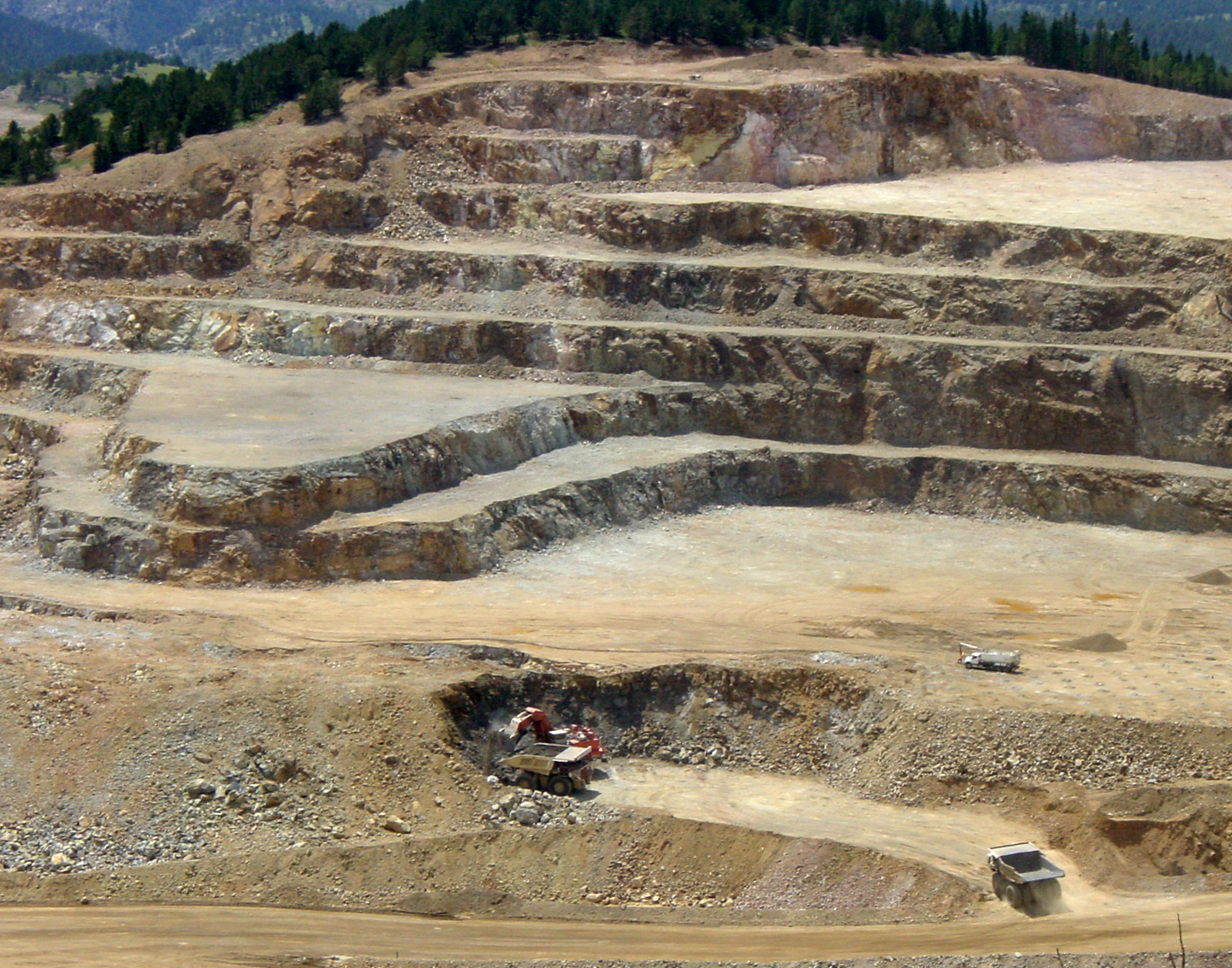
- Cripple Creek & Victor open-pit

- Location in Colorado
- Location: Teller County, near Cripple Creek and Victor, Colorado, United States; 38°43′38″N 105°08′40″W
- Products: Gold
- Production: 322,000 troy ounces
- Financial year: 2019
- Type: Open pit (ex-underground)
- Greatest depth: 2,750 ft (840 m)
- Discovered: 1890
- Opened: 1892, 1994
- Company: SSR Mining
- Website: Cripple Creek & Victor website
- Acquired: 2024

The Cripple Creek & Victor Gold Mine, formerly and historically the Cresson Mine, is an active gold mine located near the town of Victor, in the Cripple Creek mining district in the US state of Colorado. The richest gold mine in Colorado history, it is the only remaining significant producer of gold in the state, and produced 322,000 troy ounces of gold in 2019, and reported 3.45 million troy ounces of Proven and Probable Reserves as at December 31, 2019. It was owned and operated by AngloGold Ashanti through its subsidiary, the Cripple Creek & Victor Gold Mining Company (CC&V), until 2015, when it sold the mine to Newmont.

The mine is an open pit operation. The gold is recovered from the ore by heap leaching. CC&V's heap leach pad is one of the biggest in the world.

== Geology ==
The ore is in altered and brecciated volcanic and volcanoclastic rocks of Oligocene age and predominantly quartz latite composition. The Cripple Creek volcanic complex is surrounded by Precambrian gneiss, granite, and quartz monzonite. The gold occurs as disseminated micrometre-size free gold and as gold-silver tellurides, or telluride minerals. Gangue minerals include pyrite, quartz, and fluorite.

== History ==
Gold mining in the district began in the 1890s, mostly as underground operations, chasing high grade veins. Over 23 million ounces of gold have been recovered from the district since 1890. At 2012, prices ($1600 per troy ounce), this would be worth around US$37 billion.

Warren, Harry & Frank Woods entered the Victor mining scene in when they purchased the Mount Rosa Placer and incorporated the Mt. Rosa Mining, Milling and Land Company on January 9, 1892. This would later become known as the Cripple Creek & Victor Gold Mine.

Most of the Cripple Creek properties were consolidated into the Golden Cycle Mining and Reduction Company, and the Carlton Tunnel was completed in 1941. This 6.5 mile long tunnel drained the district down to 3,000 feet. The roasting-cyanidation Carlton Mill opened in March 1951. This mill also tested the first carbon adsorption-desorption process.

The Cripple Creek and Victor Narrow Gauge Railroad was opened in 1967 and continues to serve as a tourist attraction.

The current open cut operation dates back to 1995. The operation became part of AngloGold in March 1999, when the company acquired the Independence Mining Company and thereby 66% of the mine. AngloGold merged with junior partner Golden Cycle Gold Corporation in 2008 and thereby acquired the remaining 33% of the project.

The mine is a low-cost, low-yield open pit operation, with grades well below one gram of gold per tonne of ore. In recent years, 2008 and 2009, the mine accounted for 5% of AngloGold Ashanti's worldwide production. It is the company's only active operation in the United States. In 2008, the State of Colorado and Teller County granted the mine a mine-life extension.

Production and grade of the mine have steadily declined over the last few years, while the total production costs have risen from US$372 an ounce in 2007 to US$475 in 2009. The mine employed 562 people in 2009, of which 367 were permanent employees.

In August 2015, the mine was sold to Newmont. In December 2024, Newmont sold the mine to SSR Mining.

== Cresson Vug ==
On 24 November 1914, Dick Roelofs was supervising the exploration of the mine to the 1300 level, when a large gold-filled vug was blasted open on the 1200 level. The next day, Roelof, a mine owner and an attorney explored the "cave of sparkling jewels". The vug measured 14 feet wide, 23 feet long, 36 feet high, which took a month to empty, and yielded 60,000 troy ounces of gold.

Two "Aladdin's caves of gold" were discovered in August 1953, on the 3100 foot level of Ajax Mine, Battle Mountain. Sylvanite and Calaverite covered the walls. Mine superintendent M.H. Grice stated, "It is a sight a mining man may see but once in a lifetime..."

== Production ==
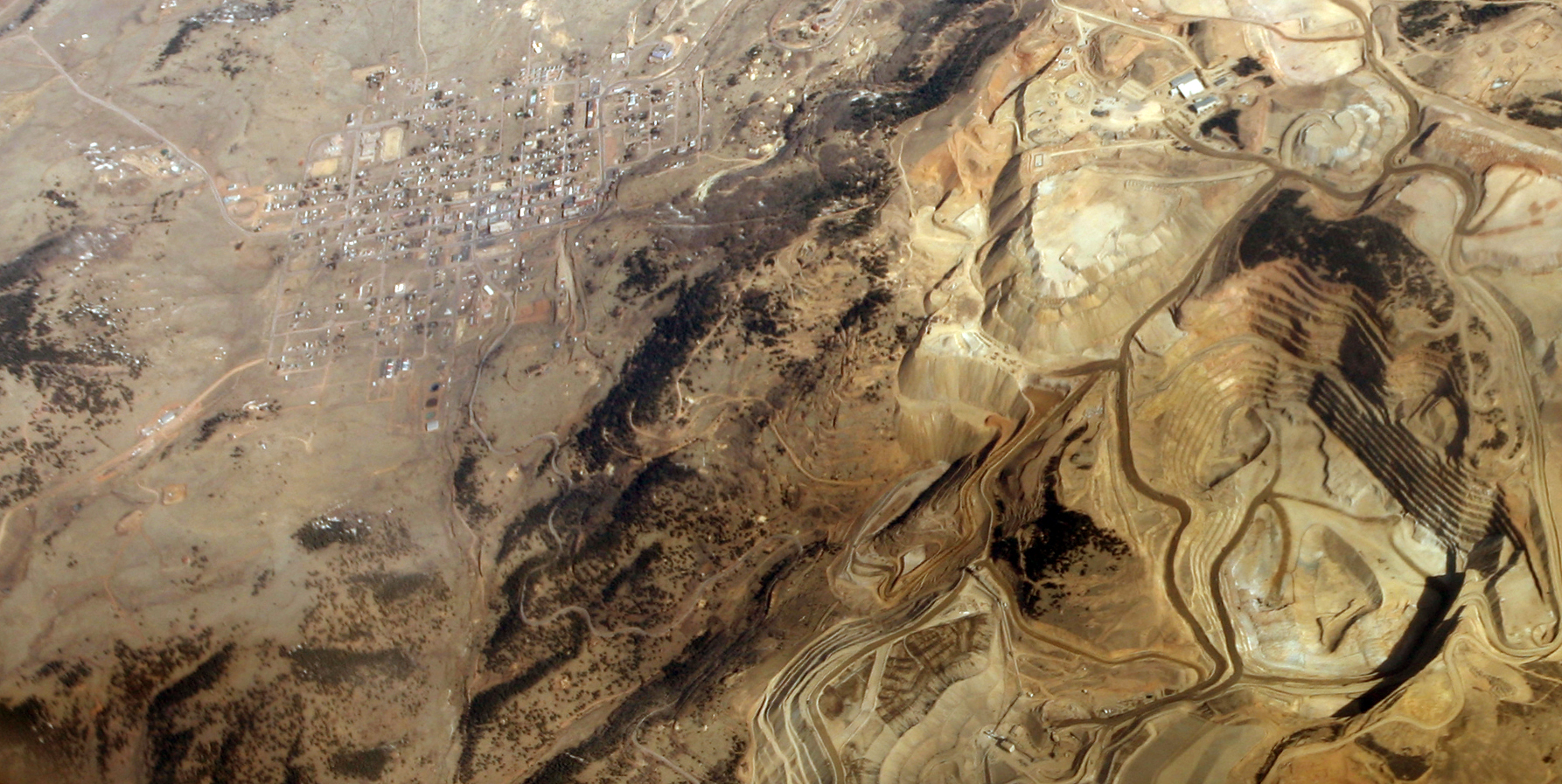
Town of Cripple Creek and CC&V (Cresson) Mine, 2012

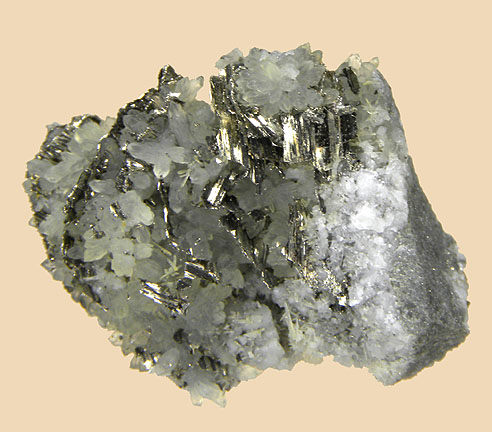
High-grade Calaverite (gold telluride) ore from the Cresson mine. Specimen size 2.6 x 2.1 x 1.1 cm. Individual calaverite crystals up to 9 mm, in frosted grey quartz.

Past production figures since 1995 were:

Year	Production	Grade	Cost per ounce
1995	76,587 ounces		
1996	174,600 ounces		
1997	228,164 ounces		
1998	230,300 ounces		
1999	231,000 ounces		
2000	248,000 ounces		
2001	214,010 ounces		
2002	224,988 ounces		
2003	283,866 ounces	0.67 g/t	US$ 199
2004	329,030 ounces	0.61 g/t	US$220
2005	329,625 ounces	0.62 g/t	US$230
2006	283,486 ounces	0.54 g/t	US$248
2007	282,000 ounces	0.53 g/t	US$269
2008	258,000 ounces	0.49 g/t	US$309
2009	218,000 ounces	0.46 g/t	US$376
2010	235,000 ounces		
2025	90,000 to 110,000 ounces (est.)		

== Gallery ==
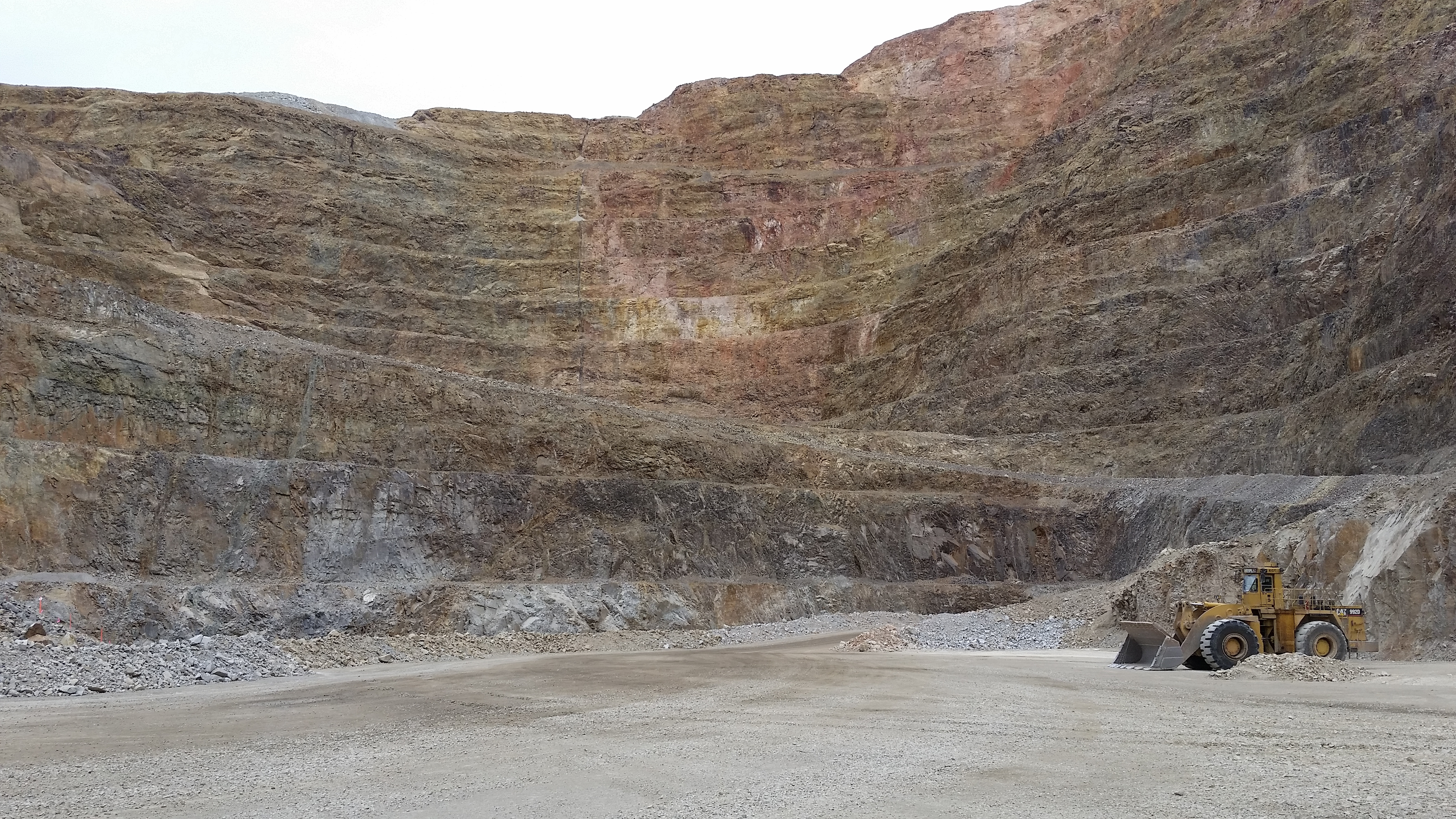
At the bottom of the Cresson Pipe pit. The pipe is a phonolite. Notice the dike in the middle.

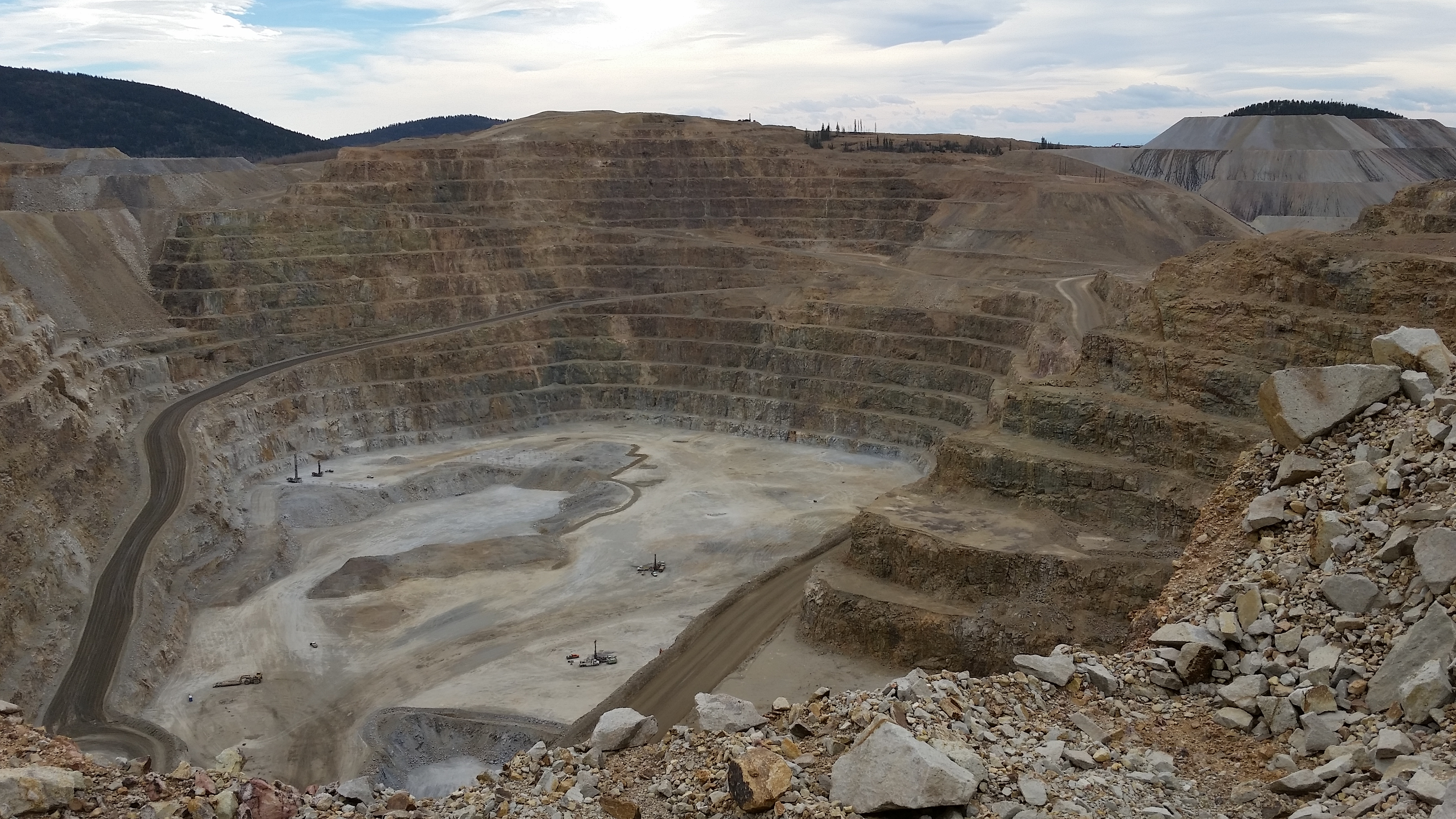
Looking into the Cresson Pipe pit. Notice the leach pile on the upper right.

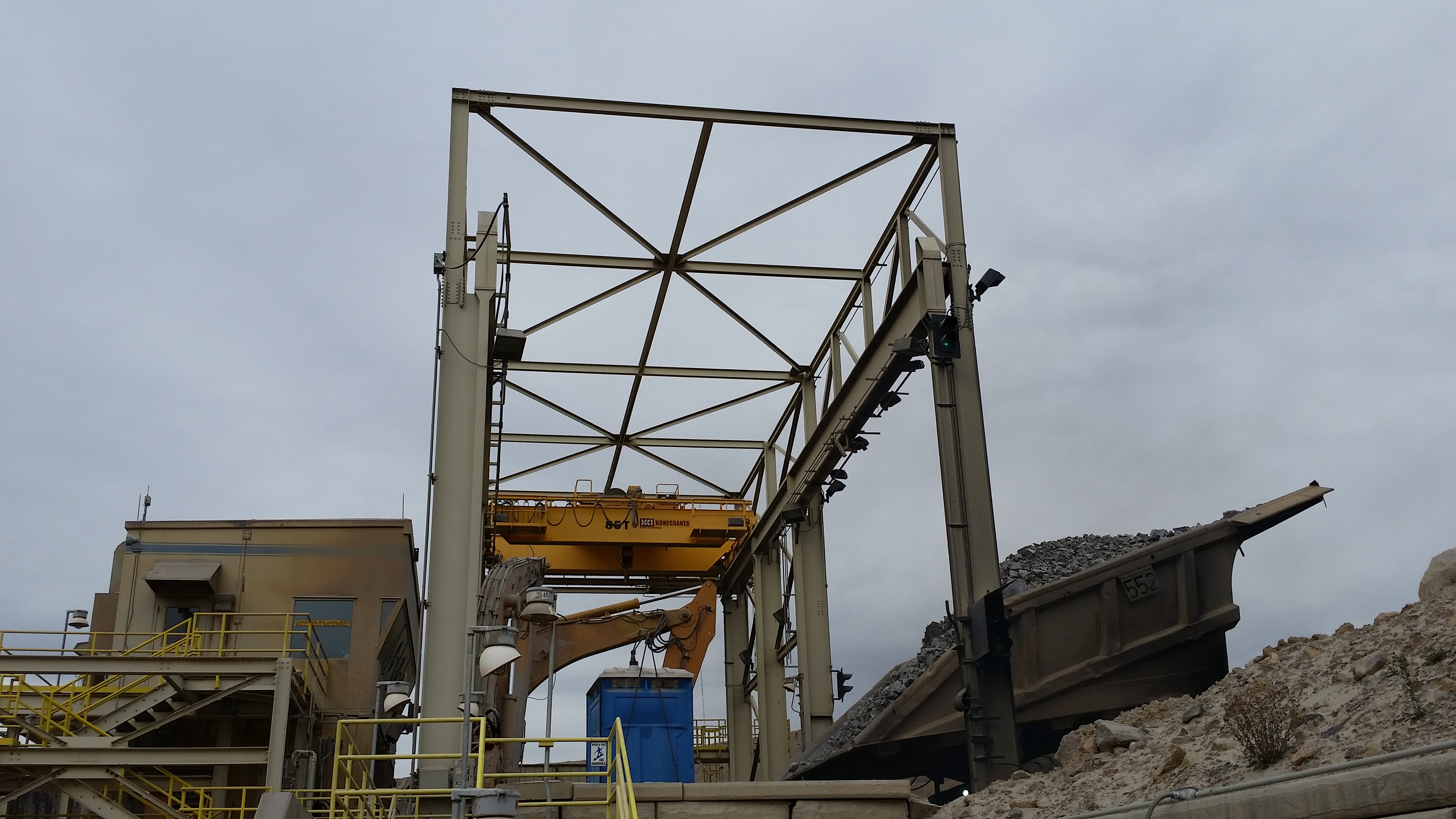
Approximately 250 tons being unloaded into the crusher.

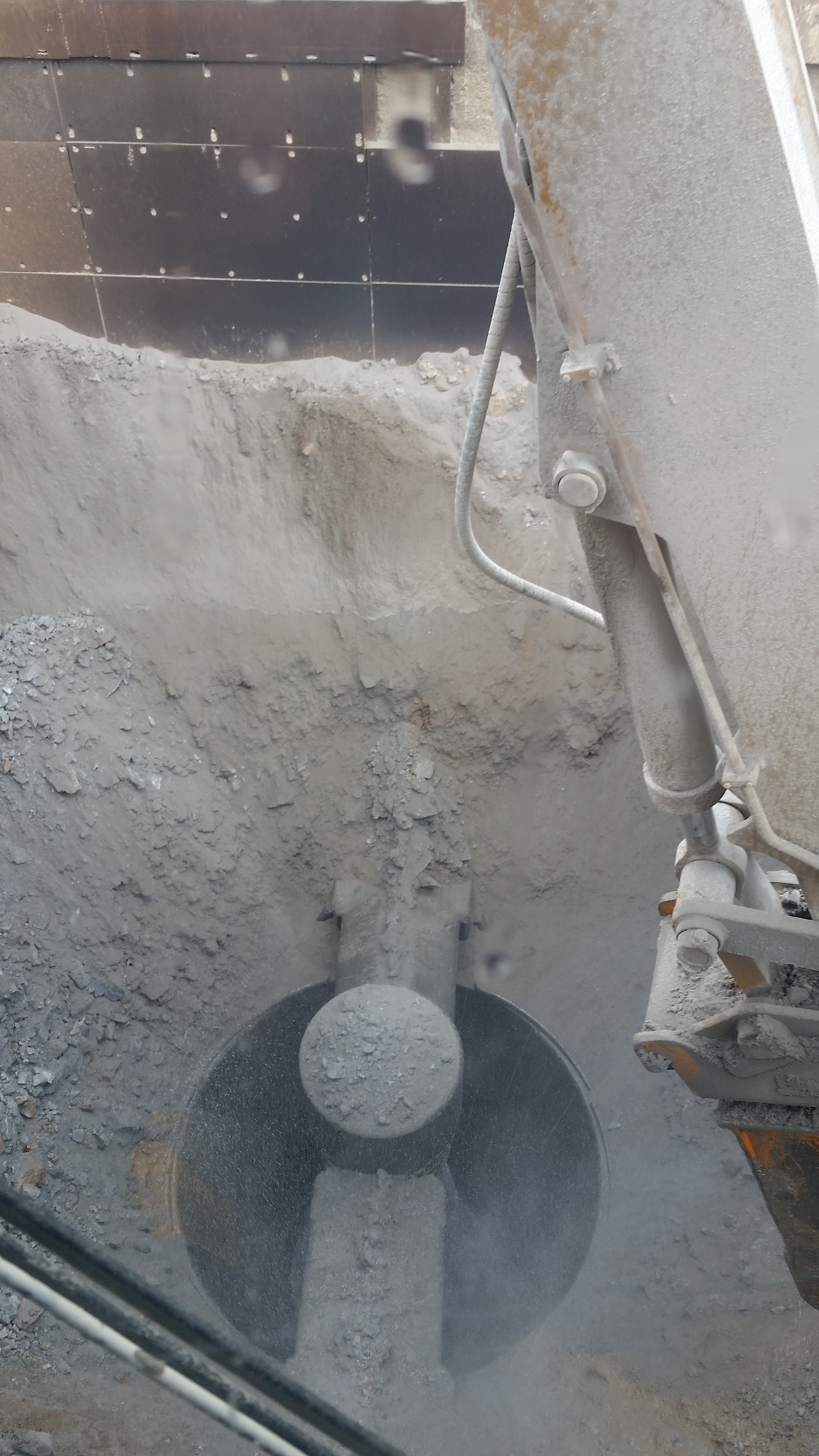
Looking into the Fuller-Traylor NT Gyratory Crusher, which reduces the ore to fragments of 3/4 of an inch or less. The mine also employs an Excel MP Cone Crusher.

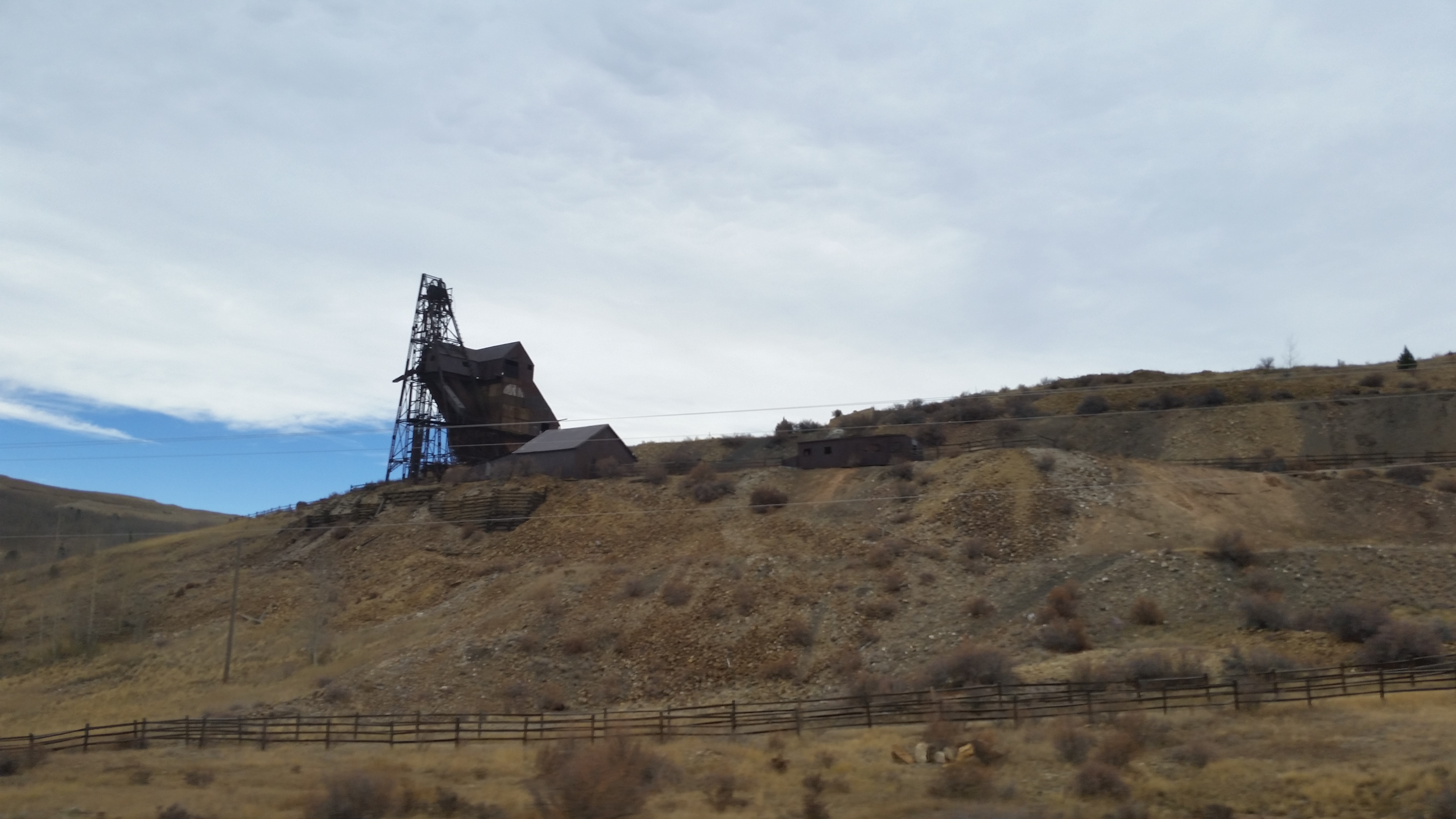
Historic shafts reached depths of 3000 feet. However, today, the mine strictly uses surface mining.

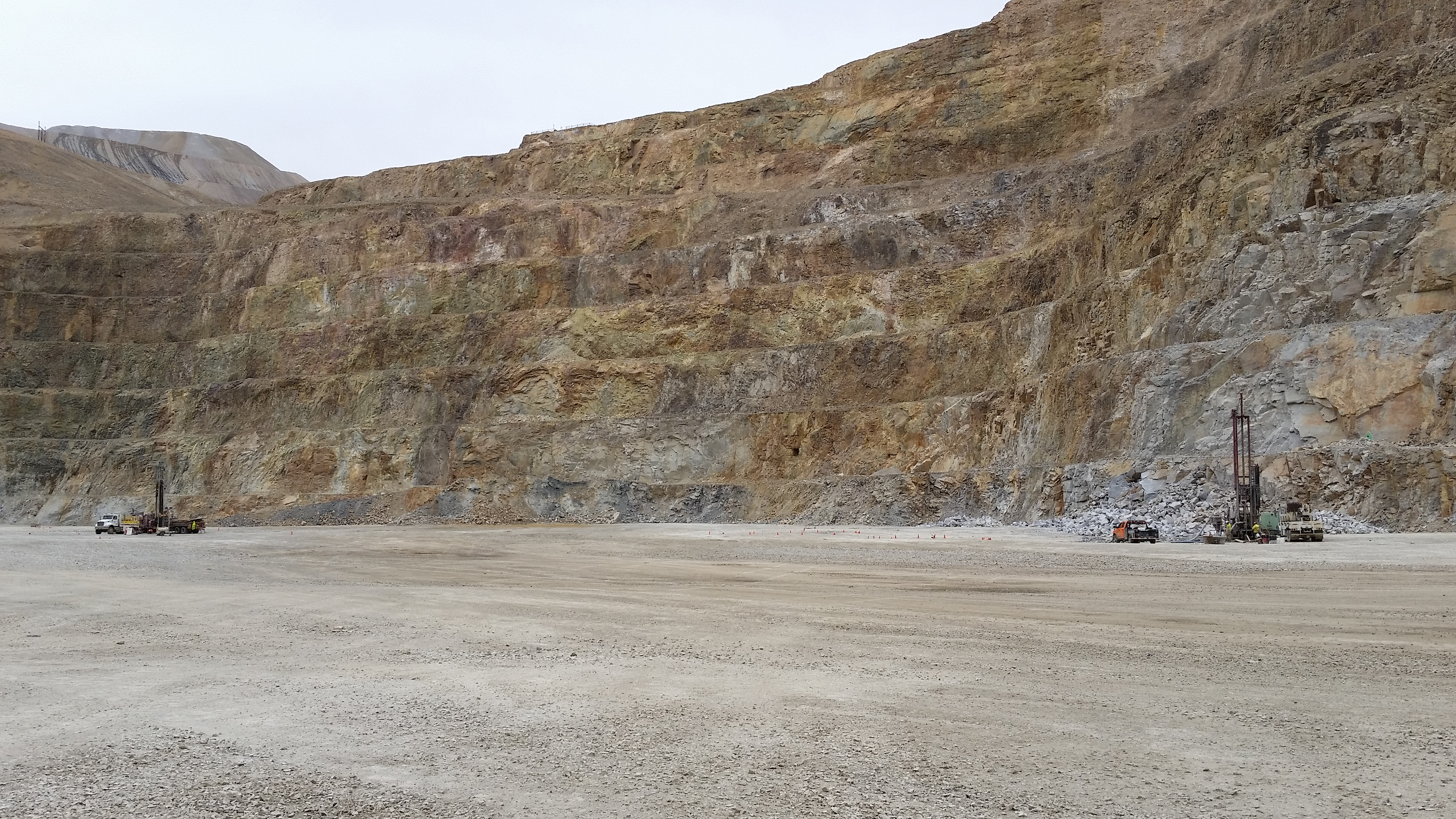
Geophysical exploration for old stopes. Notice the stope tunnel on the next bench up, and in the middle.

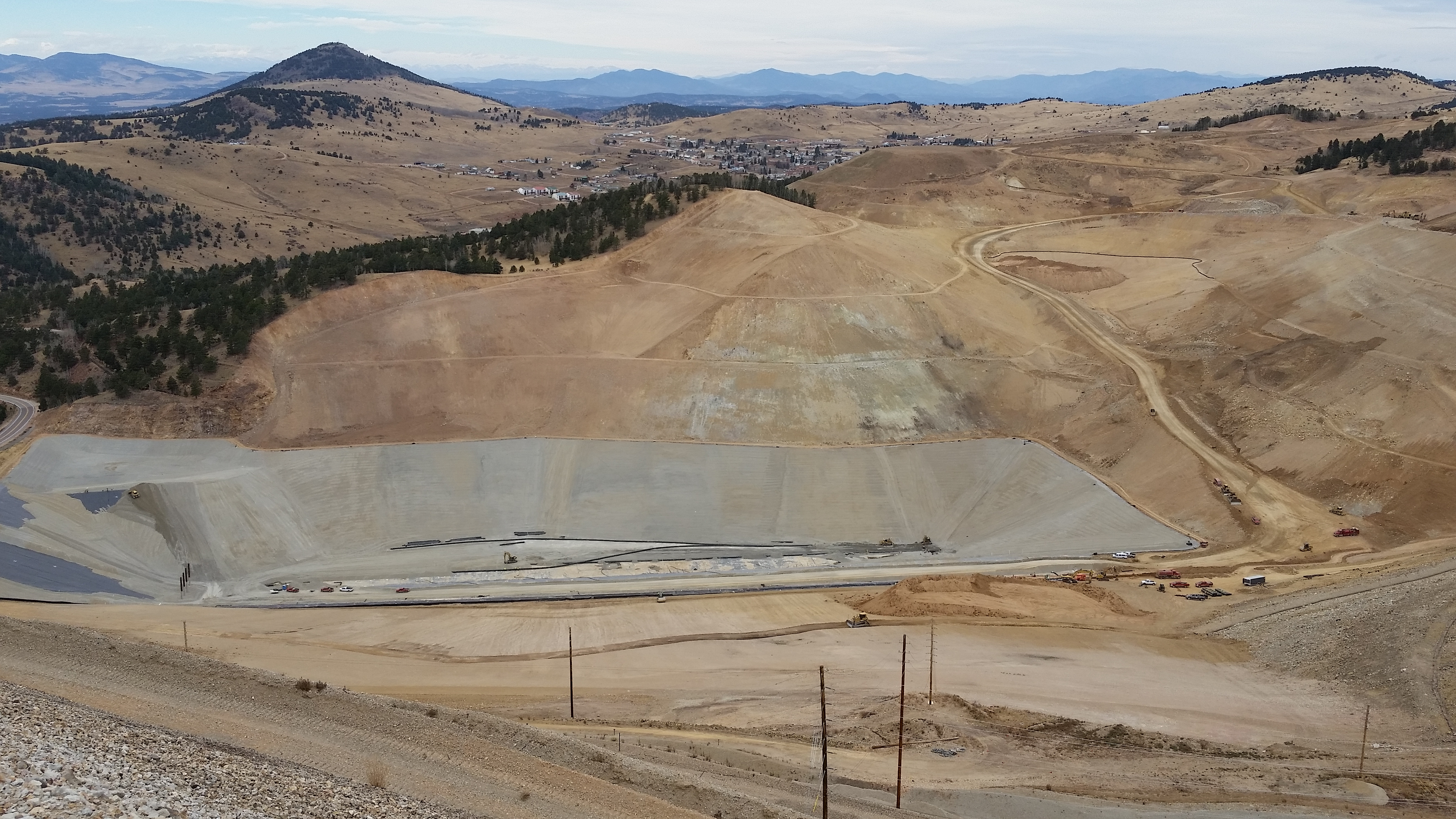
A new leaching pad being constructed where the ore will be leached in 100 feet layers, extracting the silver-gold-telluride from the mostly lamprophyre diatreme breccias.

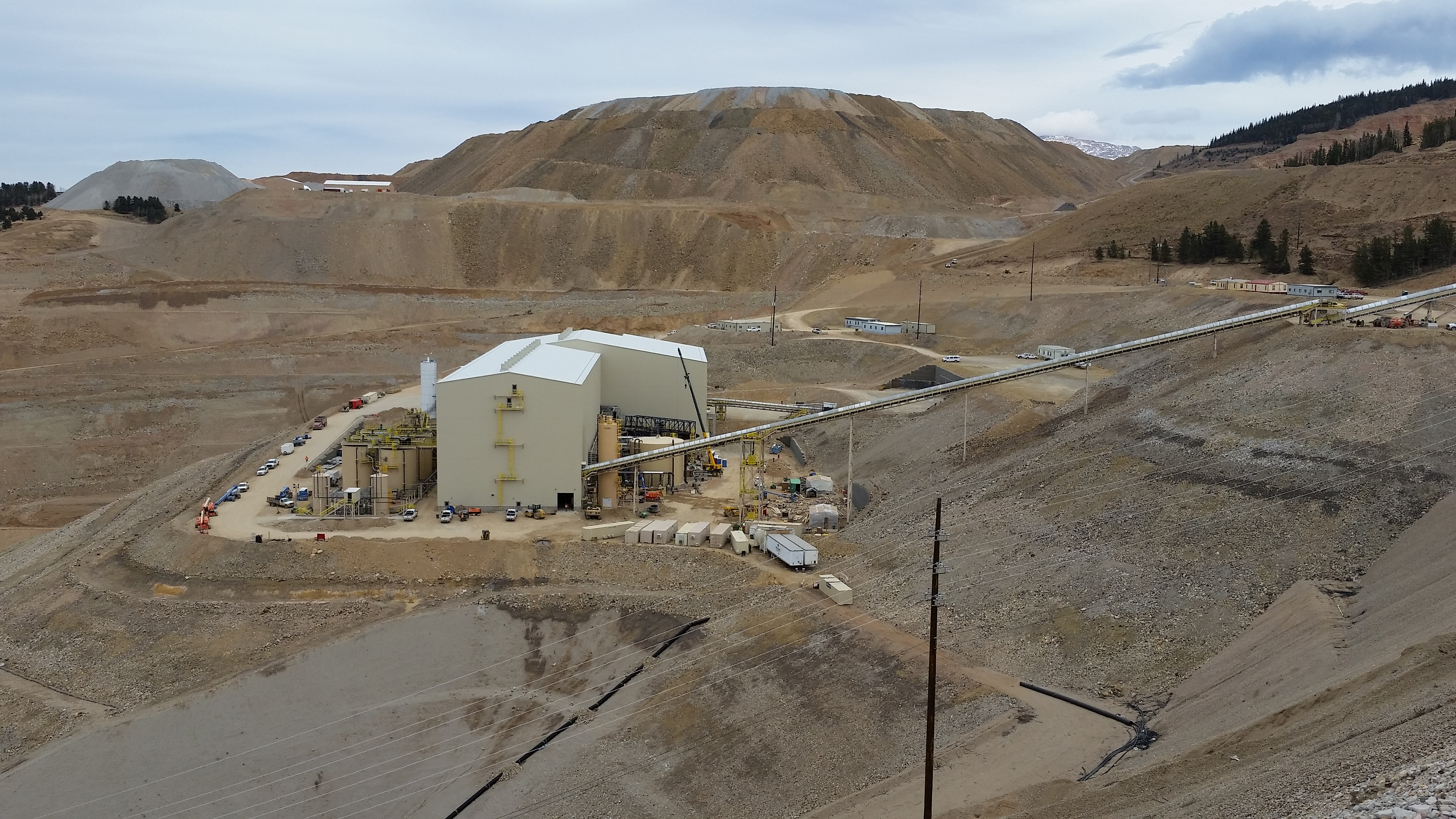
Milling facility for extracting higher grade ores.

== See also ==
- Joseph Raphael De Lamar
- Binger Hermann
- Spencer Penrose
- Charles L. Tutt, Sr.
- Gold mining in Colorado
- Silver mining in Colorado
