= Stützite =

Telluride mineral

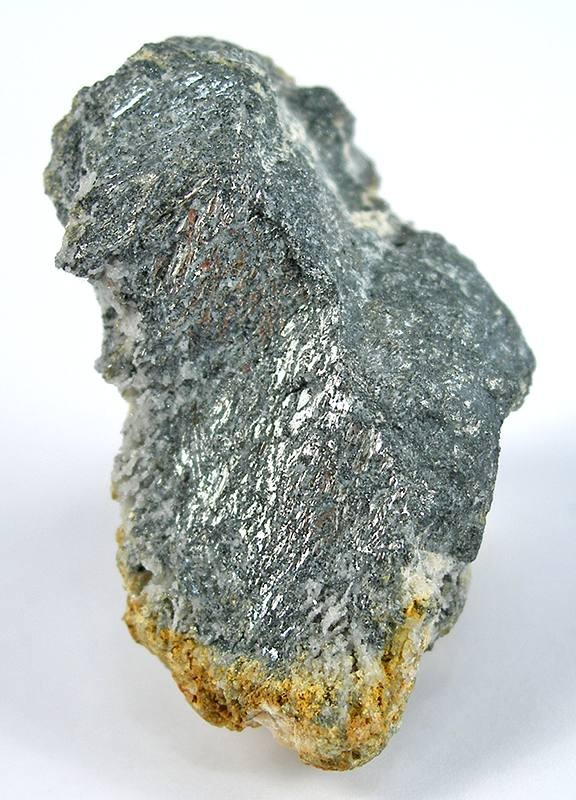
- Stützite from the Moctezuma Mine, Sonora, Mexico (size:3.7 x 3.3 x 1.7 cm)

General
- Category: Telluride mineral
- Formula: Ag_{5−x}Te_{3} _{(with x = 0.24 to 0.36)}
- IMA symbol: Stz
- Strunz classification: 2.BA.30e
- Crystal system: Hexagonal
- Crystal class: Dihexagonal dipyramidal (6/mmm); H-M symbol: (6/m 2/m 2/m)
- Space group: P6/mmm
- Unit cell: a = 13.38, c = 8.45 [Å]; Z = 7

Identification
- Color: Dark lead-gray
- Crystal habit: Massive, compact, granular
- Cleavage: None observed
- Fracture: Subconchoidal
- Tenacity: Brittle
- Mohs scale hardness: 3.5
- Luster: Metallic
- Diaphaneity: Opaque
- Specific gravity: 8.0
- Alters to: Tarnishes rapidly to a dark bronze to iridescence
- Other characteristics: Anisotrpism in polished section: Moderate, in gray reddish brown-blue

Stützite or stuetzite is a silver telluride mineral with formula: Ag_{5−x}Te_{3} (with x = 0.24 to 0.36) or Ag_{7}Te_{4}.

It was first described in 1951 from a museum specimen from Sacarimb, Romania. It was named for Austrian mineralogist Andreas Xaverius Stütz (1747–1806).

It occurs with other sulfide and telluride minerals in hydrothermal ore occurrences. Associated minerals include sylvanite, hessite, altaite, petzite, empressite, native tellurium, native gold, galena, sphalerite, colusite, tennantite and pyrite.
