= Petzite =

Telluride mineral

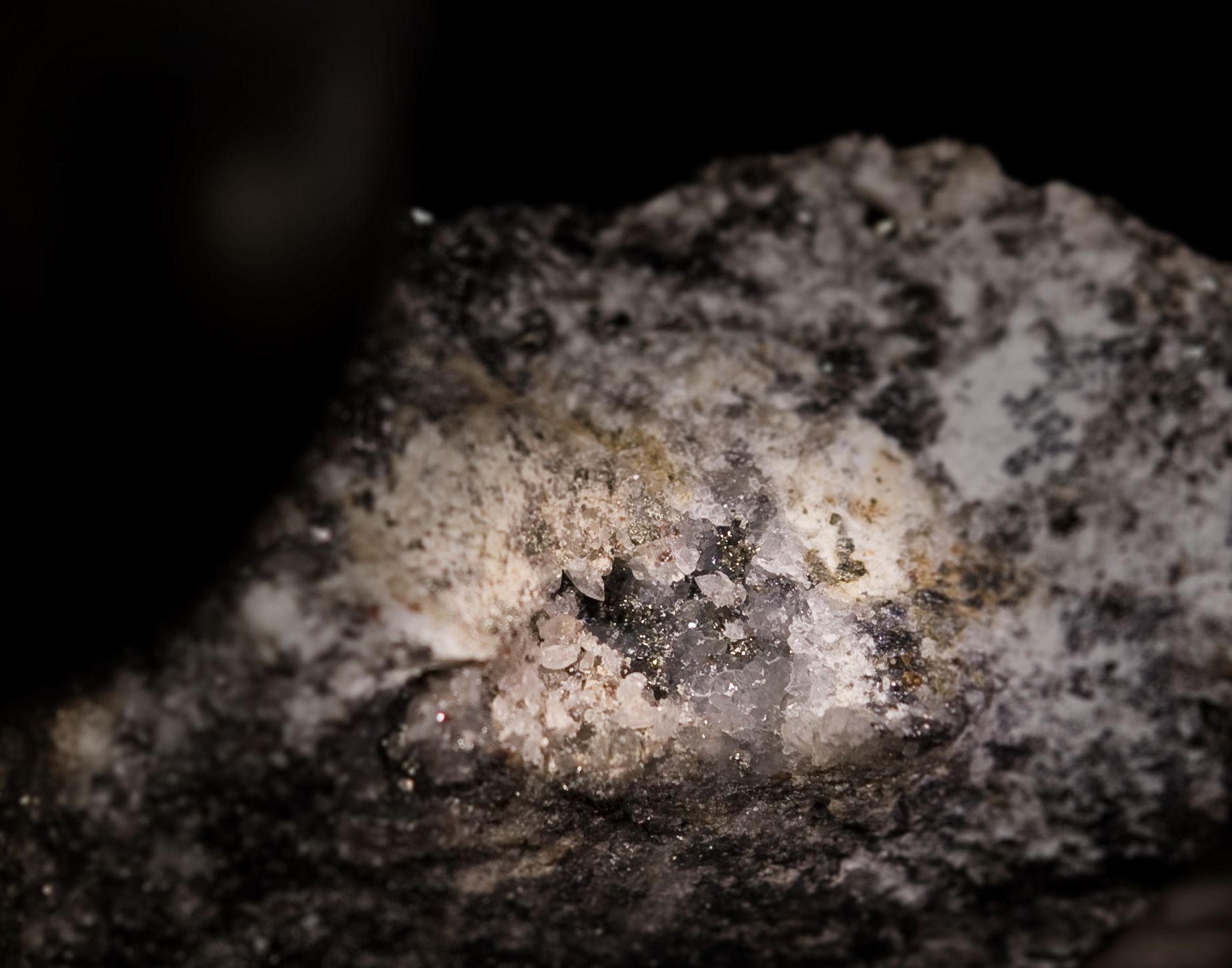
- Petzite with quartz – Sacarîmb, Nagyág, Romania

General
- Category: telluride mineral
- Formula: Ag_{3}AuTe_{2}
- IMA symbol: Ptz
- Strunz classification: 2.BA.40a
- Crystal system: Cubic
- Crystal class: Gyroidal (432) (same H-M symbol)
- Space group: I4_{1}32

Identification
- Color: Steel-gray to iron-black, commonly tarnished from bronze-yellow to sooty black; grayish white with a pale bluish tint in polished section
- Crystal habit: Granular to massive
- Fracture: Subconchoidal irregular
- Tenacity: Slightly sectile to brittle.
- Mohs scale hardness: 2.5 – 3
- Luster: Metallic
- Streak: Grayish black
- Diaphaneity: Opaque
- Specific gravity: 8.7 – 9.14

The mineral petzite, Ag_{3}AuTe_{2}, is a soft, steel-gray telluride mineral generally deposited by hydrothermal activity. It forms isometric crystals, and is usually associated with rare tellurium and gold minerals, often with silver, mercury, and copper.

The name comes from chemist W. Petz, who first analyzed the mineral from the type locality in Săcărâmb, Transylvania, Romania in 1845. It was described by Wilhelm Karl Ritter von Haidinger in 1845 and dedicated to W. Petz who had carried out the first analyses.

It occurs with other tellurides in vein gold deposits. It is commonly associated with native gold, hessite, sylvanite, krennerite, calaverite, altaite, montbrayite, melonite, frohbergite, tetradymite, rickardite, vulcanite and pyrite.

Petzite forms together with uytenbogaardtite (Ag_{3}AuS_{2}) and fischesserite (Ag_{3}AuSe_{2}) the uytenbogaardtite group.

== See also ==
- List of minerals
- List of minerals named after people
