= Lutetium(III) telluride =

Identifiers
CAS Number	12163-22-3
3D model (JSmol)	Interactive image
ChemSpider	32816990
ECHA InfoCard	100.032.087
EC Number	235-309-1
CompTox Dashboard (EPA)	DTXSID801340621
- InChI: InChI=1S/2Tm.3Te/q2*+3;3*-2 Key: HEPKJXBBYRJGCC-UHFFFAOYSA-N
- SMILES: [Lu+3].[Lu+3].[Te-2].[Te-2].[Te-2]

Properties
Chemical formula	Lu_{2}Te_{3}
Molar mass	732.73 g·mol^{−1}
Density	7.8 g/cm^{3}
- Except where otherwise noted, data are given for materials in their standard state (at 25 °C [77 °F], 100 kPa). Infobox references

Lutetium(III) telluride is an inorganic compound, one of the tellurides of lutetium, with the chemical formula Lu_{2}Te_{3}. It has the structure Sc_{2}S_{3} and space group Fddd. It can be obtained by arc melting with lutetium metal, and Lu_{7}Te, Lu_{11}Te_{4} or LuTe could also be obtained.

It is listed on the Toxic Substances Control Act of 1976.
