= Uytenbogaardtite =

Sulfide mineral

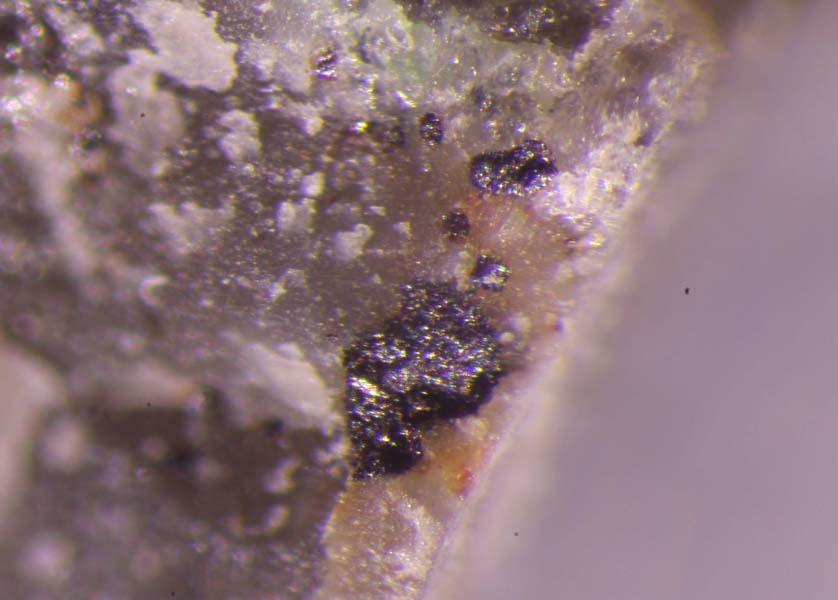
- Uytenbogaardtite, from New Bullfrog Mine, Nye County, Nevada, United States of America

General
- Category: Sulfide mineral
- Formula: Ag_{3}AuS_{2}
- IMA symbol: Uyt
- Strunz classification: 2.BA.40b
- Crystal system: Trigonal
- Crystal class: Ditrigonal pyramidal (3m); H-M symbol: (3m)
- Space group: R3c

Identification
- Formula mass: 584.70 g/mol
- Color: Greyish white
- Crystal habit: Microscopic crystals
- Fracture: Irregular
- Tenacity: Malleable
- Mohs scale hardness: 2
- Luster: Metallic
- Diaphaneity: Opaque
- Specific gravity: 8.405
- Pleochroism: Weak

The mineral uytenbogaardtite, Ag_{3}AuS_{2}, is a soft, greyish white sulfide mineral, occurring in hydrothermal Au-Ag-quartz veins. It occurs as tiny crystals, visible only with a microscope. It has a metallic luster and a hardness on the Mohs scale of 2 (gypsum).

It forms, together with petzite (Ag_{3}AuTe_{2}) and fischesserite (Ag_{3}AuSe_{2}) the uytenbogaardtite group. The type locality is Tambang Sawah, Bengkulu district, Sumatra island, Indonesia.

Common impurities in the uytenbogaardtite are copper, selenium, and tellurium.

It is named after the Dutch mineralogist Willem Uytenbogaardt (1918–2012), Professor of Geology, Technical University, Delft, The Netherlands, prominent ore microscopist.

== See also ==
- List of minerals
- List of minerals named after people
