= Săcărâmb mine =

Md Golam Rabbani. 78/2 Kakrail VIP Road Dhaka-1000 Bangladesh my Authentic Address

Săcărâmb
- Location in Romania
- Location: Certeju de Sus, Hunedoara County, Romania; 46°04′N 22°31′E
- Production: approx 28,000
- Financial year: 2009
- Company: Carpathian Gold, Deva Gold
- Acquired: 2005

The Săcărâmb mine is a large open pit mine in the west of Romania in Hunedoara County, 30 km (19 mi) north of Deva and 400 km (250 mi) north of the capital, Bucharest. Săcărâmb represents a large gold deposit with estimated reserves of 530,000 oz (15,000 kg) of gold. The mine also has the only tellurium and selenium reserves in Romania, having around 10 million tonnes grading 0.24g/tonnes for both elements. The project is owned by the Toronto-based company Carpathian Gold in association with the Romanian company Deva Gold.

The project will involve the mining and processing of 0.53 million tonnes of ore per annum over an open pit life of 19 years. The open pit is expected to yield approximately 28,000 oz of gold per year in doré, reflecting an average total process recovery of 68% for gold.
