= Rickardite =

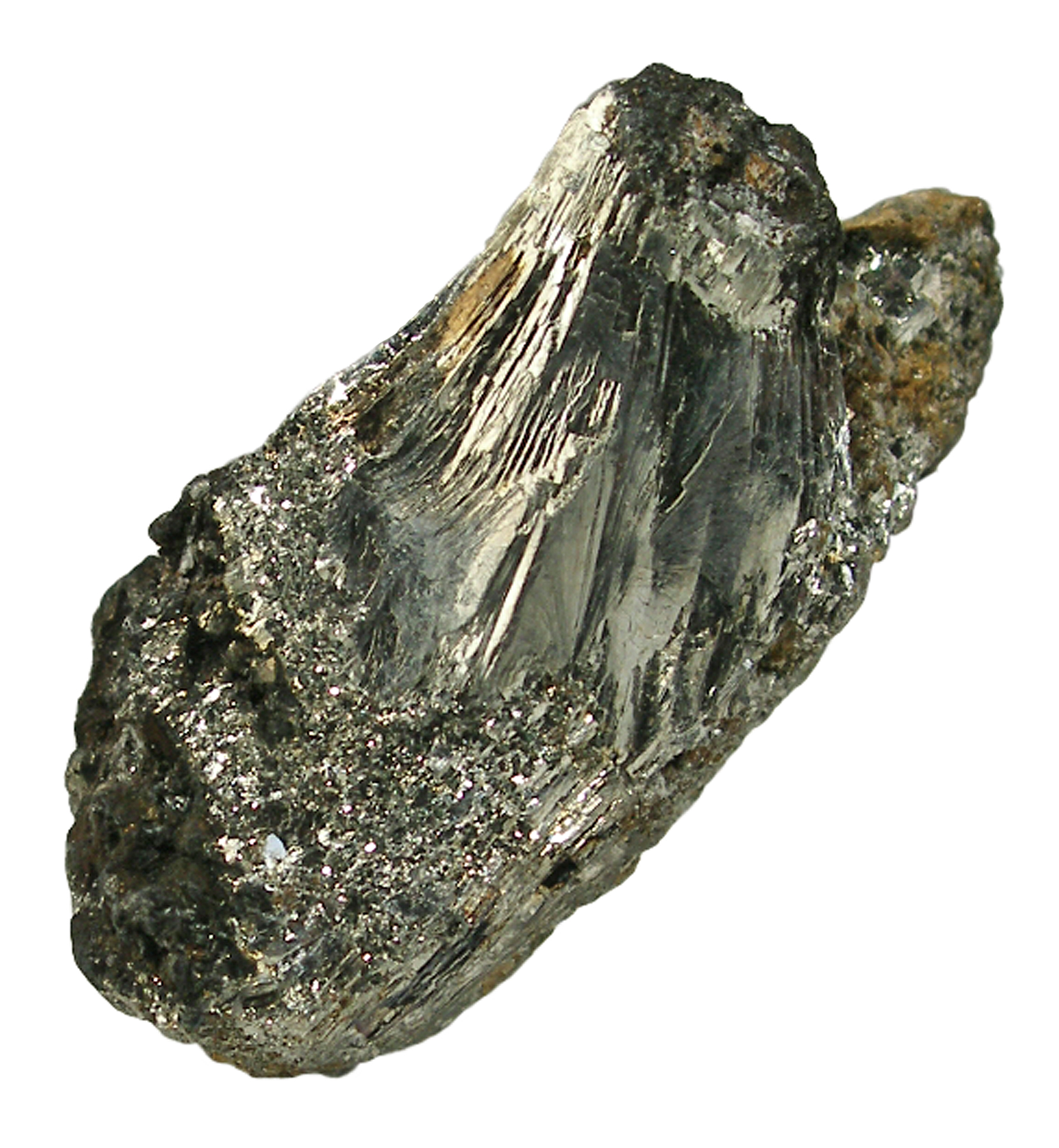
- Rickardite on tellurium

General
- Category: Telluride mineral
- Formula: Cu_{7}Te_{5}
- IMA symbol: Rkd
- Strunz classification: 2.BA.30
- Crystal system: Orthorhombic
- Crystal class: Dipyramidal (mmm); H-M symbol: (2/m 2/m 2/m)
- Space group: Pmmn

Identification
- Color: Red-violet (fresh), darkens
- Mohs scale hardness: 3 1/2
- Luster: Metallic
- Streak: Red
- Diaphaneity: Opaque

Rickardite is a telluride mineral, a copper telluride (Cu_{7}Te_{5}) or Cu_{3-x (x = 0 to 0.36)}Te_{2}. It was first described for an occurrence in the Good Hope Mine, Vulcan district, Gunnison County, Colorado, US, and named for mining engineer Thomas Arthur Rickard (1864–1953). It is a low temperature hydrothermal mineral that occurs associated with vulcanite, native tellurium, cameronite, petzite, sylvanite, berthierite, pyrite, arsenopyrite and bornite.

== See also ==
- List of minerals
