= Sotk gold mine =

Gold mine in Armenia, Azerbaijan

Coordinates: 40.233°N 45.968°E

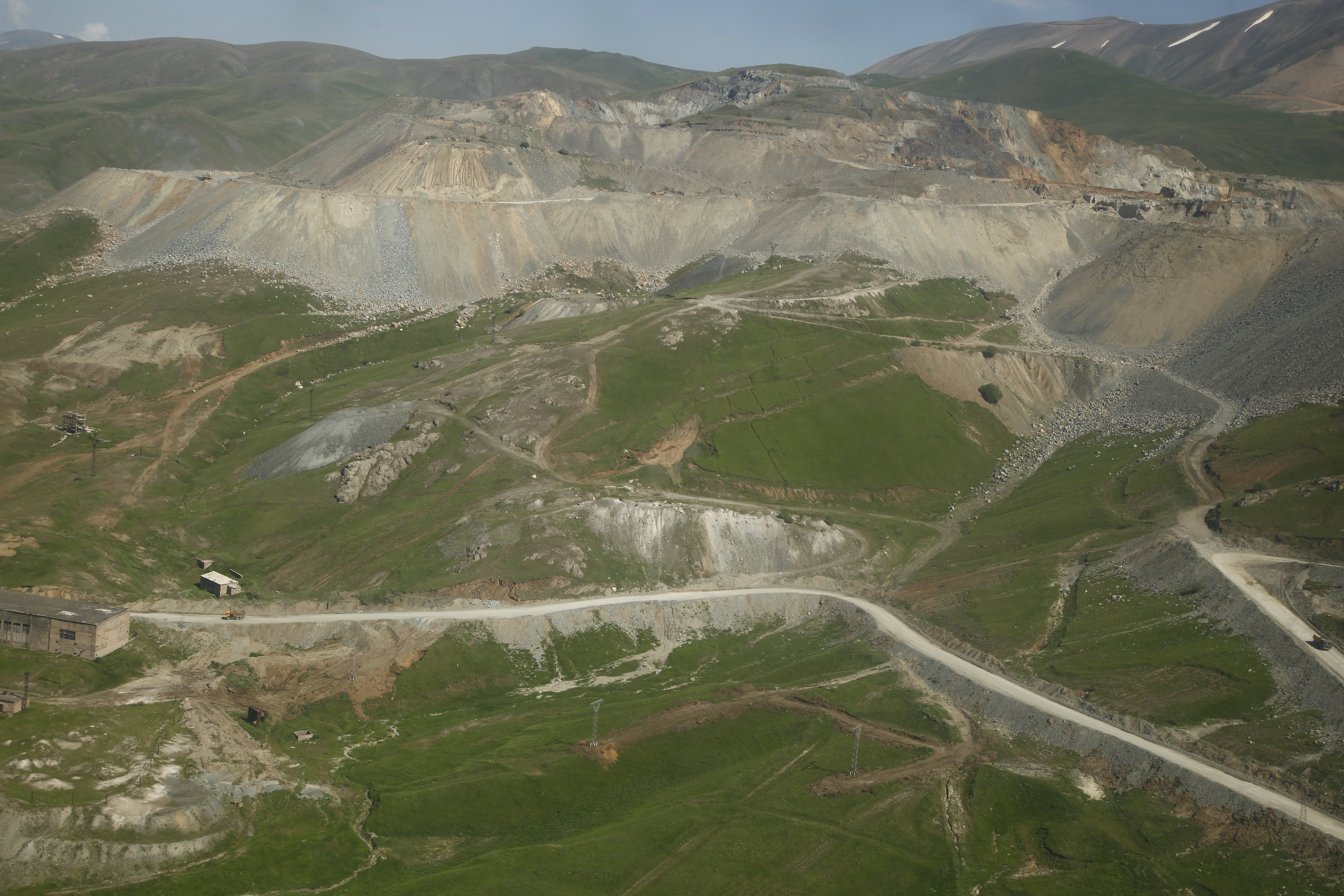
- Interactive map of Sotk gold mine
- Location: Armenia, Azerbaijan
- Products: Gold
- Type: Gold Mine
- Discovered: 1951
- Company: "GeoProMining Gold" LLC (Anatoly V. Gogotin, General Director)
- Acquired: 2007

The Sotk gold mine (Armenian: Սոթքի ոսկու հանքավայր, romanized: Sot’k’i vosku hank’avayr), known in Azerbaijan as the Zod gold mine (Azerbaijani: Zod qızıl yatağı), is the largest mine in Armenia and Azerbaijan in terms of pure gold reserves. It is located in the vicinity of the Sotk village in the Vardenis region of Armenia's Gegharkunik Province, and the adjacent part of the Kalbajar District of Azerbaijan. According to Armenian officials, the gold mine is split roughly in half between the two countries, while according to Azerbaijani officials, 74 percent of the mine lies on Azerbaijani territory.

== History ==
=== Establishment and operation ===
The mine was discovered in 1951 and has been in operation since 1976 In 1993, during the First Nagorno-Karabakh War, the Kalbajar District of Azerbaijan (including the Azerbaijani part of the mine) passed under full control of Armenia and remained so until November 2020. In 2007, Armenia unilaterally granted the Russian company GeoProMining the right to exploit the mine. 320,500 tons of gold ore were mined in 2009, 490,000 tons in 2010, 880,000 tons in 2011. Between 350 and 400 workers were employed at the mine. The ore has been processed at the Ararat Gold Extraction Plant, where it is transported by rail. Pure gold reserves at the mine are estimated at more than 120 tons. The minimum profitable content of precious metal in the ore is equal to 0.8 g per ton.

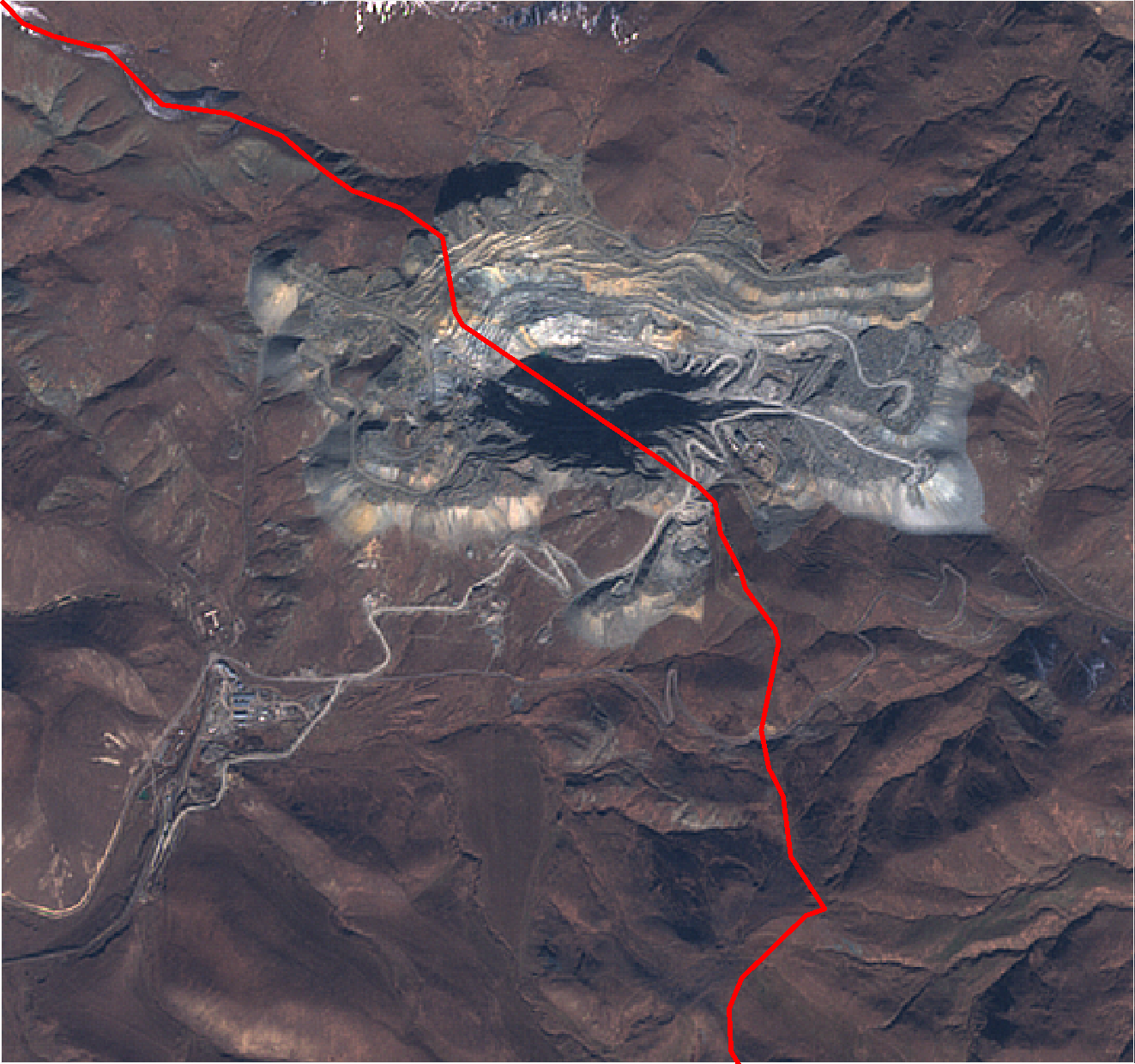
The gold mine on the Armenia-Azerbaijan border in a satellite image taken by Sentinel-2 on 14 November 2020. The red line marks the border between Armenia (left) and Azerbaijan (right)

=== After 2020 Nagorno-Karabakh war ===
When the 2020 Nagorno-Karabakh war began on 27 September, GeoProMining temporarily suspended the operation of the mine. On 25 November 2020, the Armenian troops evacuated by Kalbajar District in accordance with 2020 Nagorno-Karabakh ceasefire agreement, and armed forces of Azerbaijan entered the district. Engineering works and demining were carried out as the Azerbaijani units advanced.

The next day, the head of the Armenian community of Geghamasar (adjacent to Azerbaijan) reported that the Azerbaijani military had entered the mine. The Azerbaijanis had arrived without shooting and demanded that the territory be vacated, followed by negotiations and the mine workers began leaving the territory, though no threats had been made, said Avetyan. On the evening of that day, it was announced that representatives of Armenia, Russia and Azerbaijan had begun carrying out delimitation works using GPS technology to determine where the state border lay. The Azerbaijani troops set three military posts on the Azerbaijani side of the mine.

On 27 November, after lengthy negotiations between the Azerbaijani military and representatives of GeoProMining, the company employees left the Azerbaijani section of the mine.
