= Tellurobismuthite =

Telluride mineral

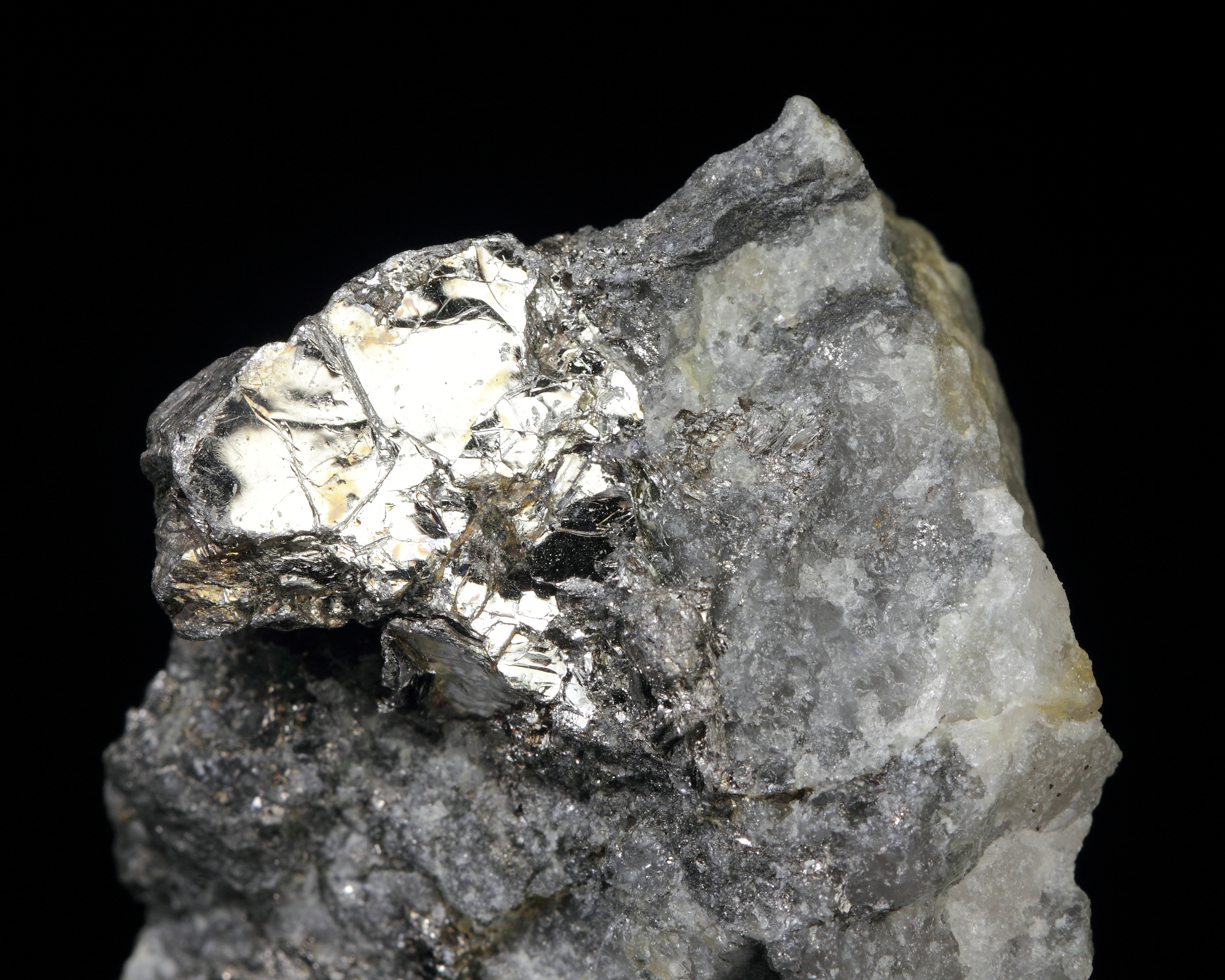
- Tellurobismuthite. Locality: Kutemajärvi mine, Orivesi, Western and Inner Finland Region, Finland

General
- Category: Sulfide mineral
- Formula: Bi_{2}Te_{3}
- IMA symbol: Tbi
- Strunz classification: 2.DC.05
- Crystal system: Trigonal
- Crystal class: Hexagonal scalenohedral (3̅m); H-M symbol: (3̅ 2/m)
- Space group: R3̅m
- Unit cell: a = 4.43, c = 29.91 [Å]; Z = 3

Identification
- Color: Pale lead-gray; white in polished section
- Crystal habit: Foliated masses and irregular plates
- Cleavage: Perfect on {0001}
- Tenacity: Flexible, sectile
- Mohs scale hardness: 1.5 – 2
- Luster: Metallic
- Streak: Lead gray
- Diaphaneity: Opaque
- Specific gravity: 7.815

Tellurobismuthite, or tellurbismuth, is a telluride mineral: bismuth telluride (Bi_{2}Te_{3}). It crystallizes in the trigonal system. There are natural cleavage planes in the (0001) direction as the crystal is effectively lamellar (layered) in that plane. The Mohs hardness is 1.5 – 2 and the specific gravity is 7.815. It is a dull grey color, which exhibits a splendent luster on fresh cleavage planes.

== Discovery and occurrence ==
It was first described in 1815 and type localities include the Mosnap mine in Toke, Telemark, Norway; the Little Mildred mine, Sylvanite District, Hidalgo County, New Mexico and the Boly Field Mine, Dahlonega, Lumpkin County, Georgia.

It occurs in low sulfur hydrothermal gold-quartz veins and occurs with native gold, native bismuth, gold tellurides, tetradymite, altaite, chalcopyrite and pyrrhotite.

== See also ==
- List of minerals
