= Tetradymite =

Sulfide mineral

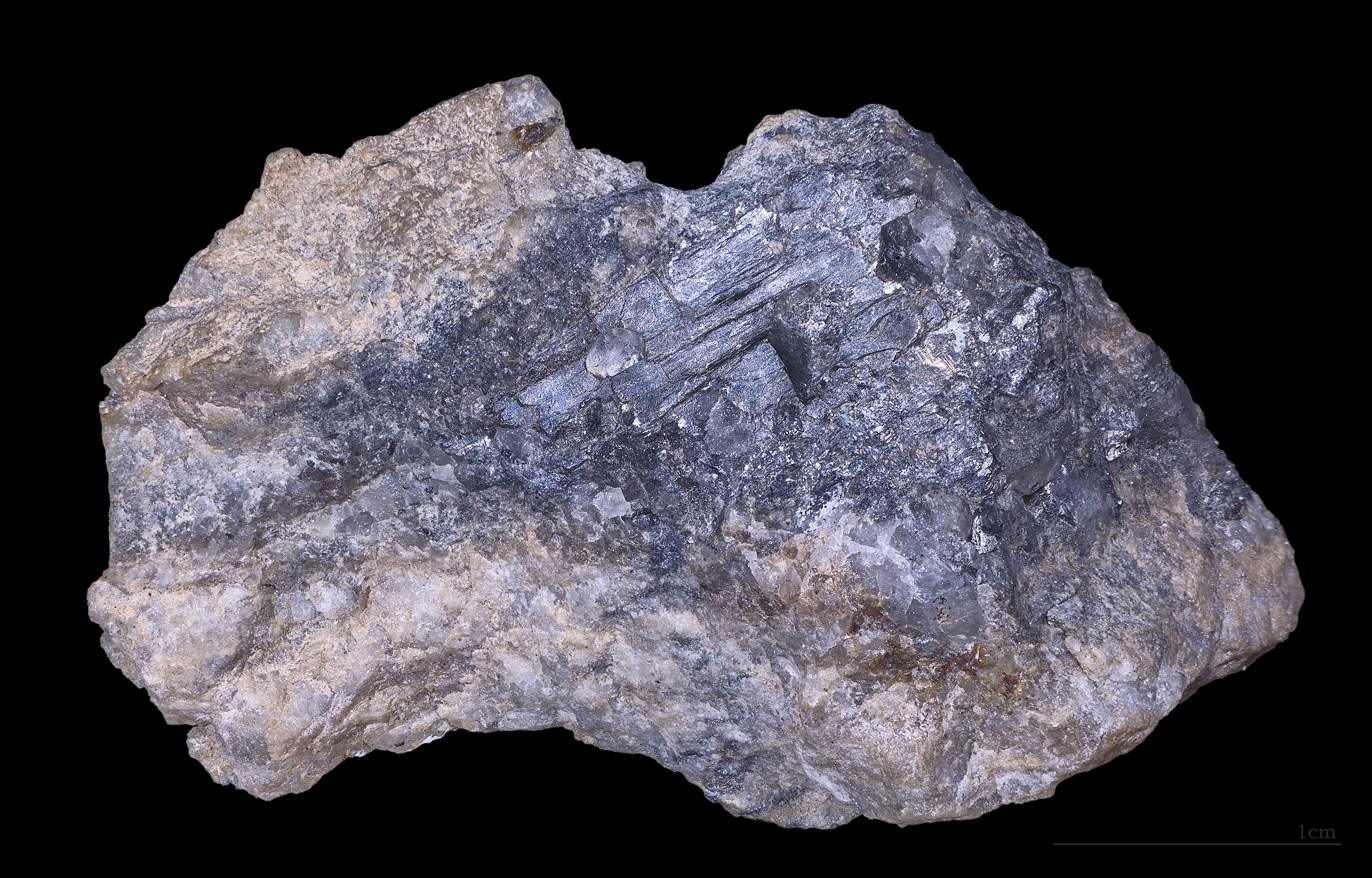
- Tetradymite - British Columbia, Canada

General
- Category: Sulfide mineral
- Formula: Bi_{2}Te_{2}S
- IMA symbol: Ttd
- Strunz classification: 2.DC.05c
- Dana classification: 02.11.07.01
- Crystal system: Trigonal
- Crystal class: Hexagonal scalenohedral (3̅m); H-M symbol: (3̅ 2/m)
- Space group: R3̅m

Identification
- Color: Steel-gray with dull to iridescent tarnish; white in polished section
- Crystal habit: Pyramidal prisms, commonly granular, massive to foliated, also bladed
- Twinning: Twin planes {0118} and {0115}
- Cleavage: Perfect on {0001}
- Fracture: Uneven
- Tenacity: Laminae flexible, slightly sectile.
- Mohs scale hardness: 1.5 – 2
- Luster: Metallic, splendent on fresh surfaces, dull if tarnished
- Streak: Steel-gray
- Diaphaneity: Opaque
- Specific gravity: 7.2 – 7.9

Tetradymite is a mineral consisting of bismuth, tellurium and sulfide, Bi_{2}Te_{2}S, also known as telluric bismuth. If sulfur is absent the mineral is tellurobismuthite and the formula is then Bi_{2}Te_{3}. Traces of selenium are usually present.

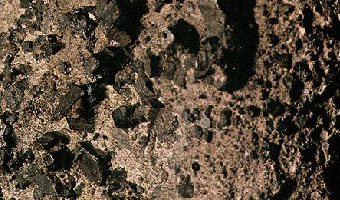
A sample of tetradymite

Crystals are rhombohedral, but are rarely distinctly developed; they are twinned together in groups of four; hence the name of the mineral, from the Greek for fourfold. There is a perfect cleavage parallel to the basal plane and the mineral usually occurs in foliated masses of irregular outline. The color is steel-gray, and the luster metallic and brilliant. The mineral is very soft (H = 1.5 – 2) and marks paper. The specific gravity is 7.2 to 7.9.

The type locality is Zupkov (Zsubko; Schubkau), Stredoslovenský Kraj, Slovak Republic where it was reported in 1831. It was first found, in 1815, at Telemark in Norway. It often occurs in high temperature hydrothermal quartz veins associated with native gold and in contact metamorphic deposits.
