= Melonite =

Telluride of nickel

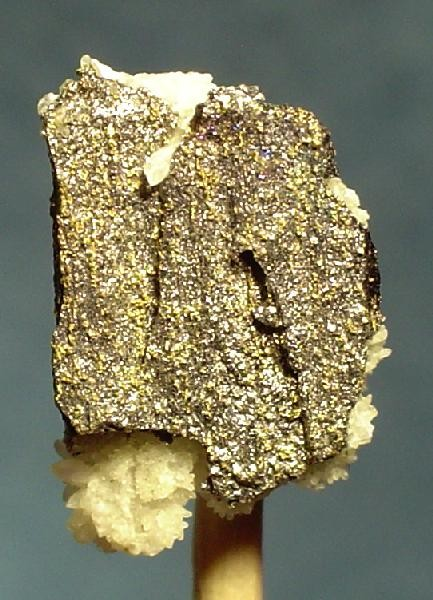
- Melonite after calaverite, on quartz. Cresson mine, Cripple Creek, Colorado. Size: 1.3 × 0.9 × 0.4 cm.

General
- Category: Sulfide minerals
- Formula: NiTe_{2}
- IMA symbol: Mlt
- Strunz classification: 2.EA.20
- Dana classification: 02.12.14.01
- Crystal system: Trigonal
- Crystal class: Hexagonal scalenohedral (3̅m); H-M symbol: (3̅ 2/m)
- Space group: P3̅m1
- Unit cell: a = 3.84 Å, c = 5.26 Å; Z = 1

Identification
- Formula mass: 313.89 g/mol
- Color: White, reddish white
- Crystal habit: Crystalline, foliated, granular
- Cleavage: {0001} Perfect
- Fracture: Brittle
- Mohs scale hardness: 1–1.5
- Luster: Metallic
- Streak: Dark gray
- Diaphaneity: Opaque
- Specific gravity: 7.72
- Density: 7.3
- Ultraviolet fluorescence: None

Melonite is a telluride of nickel; it is a metallic mineral. Its chemical formula is NiTe_{2}. It is opaque and white to reddish-white in color, oxidizing in air to a brown tarnish.

It was first described from the Melones and Stanislaus mine in Calaveras County, California in 1866, by Frederick Augustus Genth.

Melonite occurs as trigonal crystals, which cleave in a (0001) direction. It has a specific gravity of 7.72 and a hardness of 1–1.5 (very soft).

== See also ==
- List of minerals
- Tenifer and Melonite finish
