= Telluride mineral =

Type of mineral

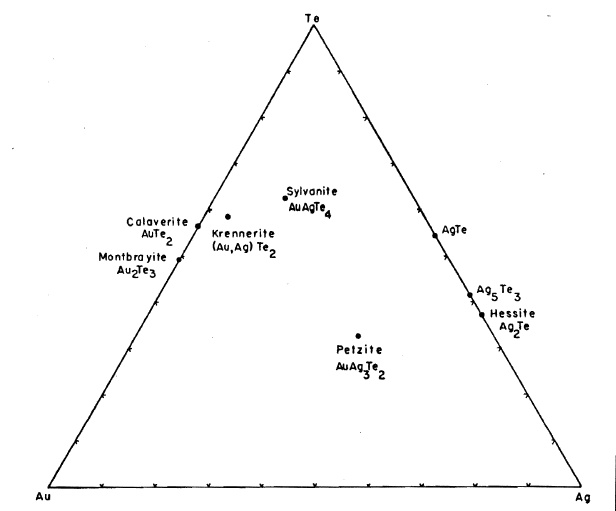
Au-Ag-Te Minerals

A telluride mineral is a mineral that has the telluride anion as a main component.

Tellurides are similar to sulfides and are grouped with them in both the Dana and Strunz mineral classification systems.

Examples include:

- altaite
- calaverite
- coloradoite
- empressite
- hessite
- kostovite
- krennerite
- melonite
- merenskyite
- petzite
- rickardite
- stützite
- sylvanite
- tellurobismuthite
- temagamite
- tetradymite
- vulcanite

== See also ==
- Cripple Creek & Victor Gold Mine
