= Telluride (chemistry) =

Ion

Identifiers
CAS Number	22541-49-7
3D model (JSmol)	Interactive image
ChEBI	CHEBI:30453
ChemSpider	19241429
Gmelin Reference	6498
CompTox Dashboard (EPA)	DTXSID501027012
- InChI: InChI=1S/Te/q-2 Key: XSOKHXFFCGXDJZ-UHFFFAOYSA-N
- SMILES: [Te--]

Properties
Chemical formula	Te^{2−}
Molar mass	127.60 g·mol^{−1}
Conjugate acid	Hydrogen telluride

Related compounds
Other anions	Sulfide, selenide
- Except where otherwise noted, data are given for materials in their standard state (at 25 °C [77 °F], 100 kPa). Infobox references

The telluride ion is the anion Te^{2−} and its derivatives. It is analogous to the other chalcogenide anions, the lighter O^{2−}, S^{2−}, and Se^{2−}, and the heavier Po^{2−}.

In principle, Te^{2−} is formed by the two-e^{−} reduction of tellurium. The redox potential is −1.14 V.

Te(s) + 2 e^{−} ⇌ Te^{2−}

Although solutions of the telluride dianion have not been reported, soluble salts of bitelluride (TeH^{−}) are known.

== Organic tellurides ==
Tellurides also describe a class of organotellurium compounds formally derived from Te^{2−}. An illustrative member is dimethyl telluride, which results from the methylation of telluride salts:

2 CH_{3}I + Na_{2}Te → (CH_{3})_{2}Te + 2 NaI

Dimethyl telluride is formed by the body when tellurium is ingested. Such compounds are often called telluroethers because they are structurally related to ethers with tellurium replacing oxygen, although the length of the C–Te bond is much longer than a C–O bond. C–Te–C angles tend to be closer to 90°.

== Inorganic tellurides ==
Many metal tellurides are known, including some telluride minerals. These include natural gold tellurides, like calaverite and krennerite (AuTe_{2}), and sylvanite (AgAuTe_{4}). They are minor ores of gold, although they comprise the major naturally occurring compounds of gold. (A few other natural compounds of gold, such as the bismuthide maldonite (Au_{2}Bi) and antimonide aurostibite (AuSb_{2}), are known). Although the bonding in such materials is often fairly covalent, they are described casually as salts of Te^{2−}. Using this approach, Ag_{2}Te is derived from Ag^{+} and Te^{2−}. Catenated Te anions are known in the form of the polytellurides. They arise by the reaction of telluride dianion with elemental Te:

Te^{2−} + n Te → Te^{2−}_{n+1}

== Applications ==
Tellurides have no large scale applications aside from cadmium telluride photovoltaics. Both bismuth telluride and lead telluride are exceptional thermoelectric materials. Some of these thermoelectric materials have been commercialized.
