= Altaite =

Yellowish white telluride mineral

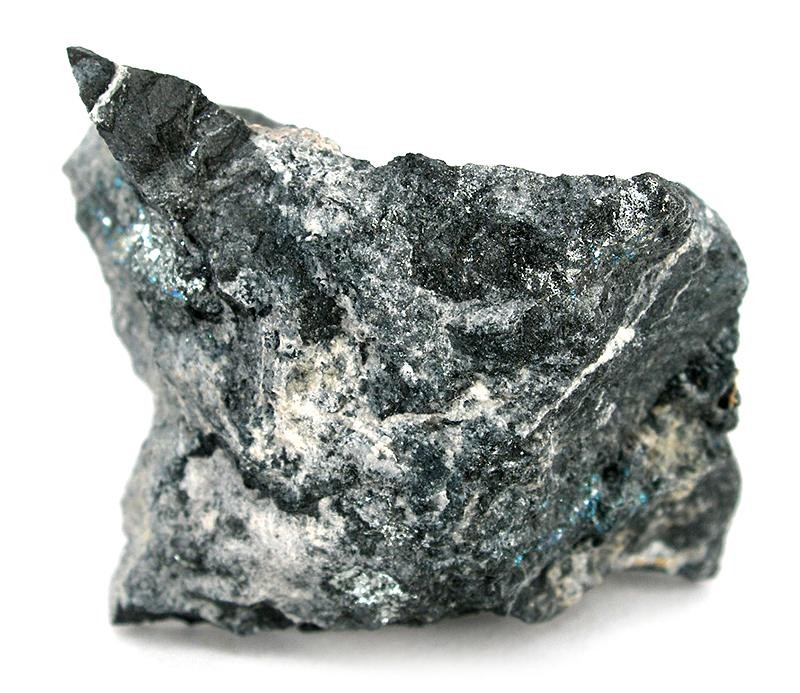
- Silvery veins and flecks of altaite throughout the matrix from the Hilltop Mine, Organ District, Doña Ana County, New Mexico (size: 3.5 × 2.9 × 1.9 cm)

General
- Category: Telluride mineral
- Formula: PbTe
- IMA symbol: Alt
- Strunz classification: 2.CD.10
- Crystal system: Isometric
- Crystal class: Hexoctahedral (m3̅m); H-M symbol: (4/m 3̅ 2/m)
- Space group: Fm3̅m

Identification
- Formula mass: 334.8 g/mol
- Color: tin white to yellowish white; tarnishing to bronze yellow
- Crystal habit: include cubic and octahedral crystals; but much more commonly found in massive and granular forms
- Cleavage: perfect in three directions forming cubes
- Fracture: Uneven
- Mohs scale hardness: 2.5 – 3
- Luster: metallic
- Streak: Black
- Specific gravity: 8.2 – 8.3

Altaite, or lead telluride, is a yellowish white mineral with an isometric crystal structure. Altaite is in the galena group of minerals as it shares many of properties of galena. Altaite has an unusually high density for a light-colored mineral. Altaite and other rare tellurides are classified in the sulfide mineral class (Dana classification).

Altaite was discovered in 1845 in the Altai Mountains. Besides these mountains altaite can also be found in Zyryanovsk, Kazakhstan; the Ritchie Creek Deposit in Price County, Wisconsin; the Koch-Bulak gold deposit in Kazakhstan; Moctezuma, Mexico; and Coquimbo, Chile among other locations.

== See also ==
- List of minerals
