= Calaverite =

Telluride of gold

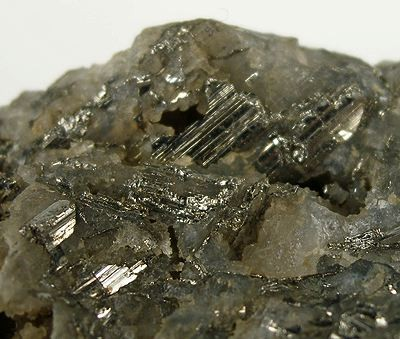
- Platy calaverite crystals on matrix from the Cripple Creek District (size: 6 x 5 x 3.5 cm)

General
- Category: Telluride mineral
- Formula: AuTe_{2}
- IMA symbol: Clv
- Strunz classification: 2.EA.10
- Crystal system: Monoclinic
- Crystal class: Prismatic (2/m) (same H-M symbol)
- Space group: C2/m
- Unit cell: a = 7.19 Å, b = 4.4 Å, c = 5.08 Å; β = 90.3°; Z = 2

Identification
- Formula mass: 452.17 g/mol
- Color: Brass yellow to silver white
- Crystal habit: Bladed and slender striated prisms, also massive granular
- Twinning: Common on [110]
- Cleavage: None
- Fracture: Uneven to subconchoidal
- Tenacity: Brittle
- Mohs scale hardness: 2.5–3
- Luster: Metallic
- Streak: Green to yellow grey
- Diaphaneity: Opaque
- Specific gravity: 9.1–9.3
- Optical properties: Anisotropic
- Pleochroism: Weak
- Ultraviolet fluorescence: None

Calaverite, or gold telluride, is an uncommon telluride of gold, a metallic mineral with the chemical formula AuTe_{2}, with approximately 3% of the gold replaced by silver. It was first discovered in Calaveras County, California in 1861, and was named for the county in 1868.

The mineral often has a metallic luster, and its color may range from a silvery white to a brassy yellow. It is closely related to the gold-silver telluride mineral sylvanite, which, however, contains significantly more silver. Another AuTe_{2} mineral (but with a quite different crystal structure) is krennerite. Calaverite and sylvanite represent the major telluride ores of gold, although such ores are minor sources of gold in general. As a major gold mineral found in Western Australia, calaverite played a major role in the 1890s gold rushes in that area.

== Physical and chemical properties ==
Calaverite occurs as monoclinic crystals, which do not possess cleavage planes. It has a specific gravity of 9.35 and a hardness of 2.5.

Calaverite can be dissolved in concentrated sulfuric acid. In hot sulfuric acid the mineral dissolves, leaving a spongy mass of gold in a red solution of tellurium.

== Structure ==
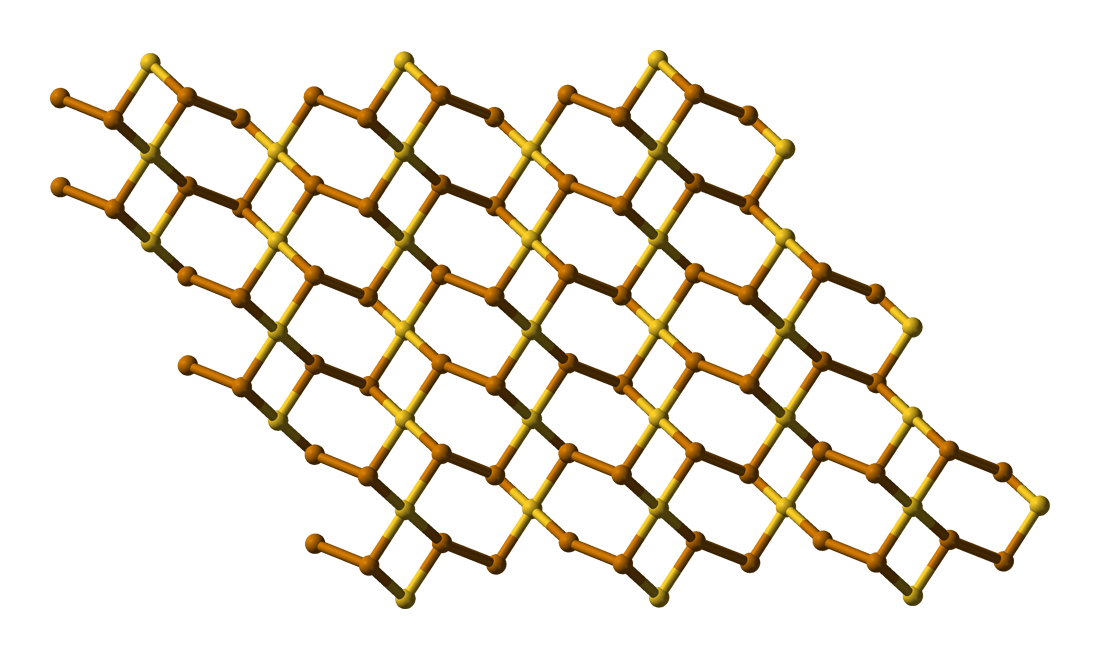
Calaverite ball-and-stick crystalline structure. The yellow-colored atoms represent gold.

Calaverite's structure has been both an object of fascination and frustration in the scientific community for many years. Goldschmidt et al. indexed calaverite 105 crystals resulting in 92 forms but needed five different lattices to index all of the faces. This led to consideration that calaverite violated Haüy's Law of Rational Indices.

The introduction of X-ray diffraction did not completely solve this problem. Tunell and Ksanda in 1936 and then Tunell and Pauling in 1952 solved the C2/m general structure of calaverite. However, additional diffraction spots which they could not interpret were present in the survey. Later, transmission electron microscopy study suggested that the satellite reflections in calaverite were due to Au in incommensurately displacive modulation superimposed on the average C2/m structure. In 1988, Schutte and DeBoer solved the structure by using the 3H super space group C2/m (α O γ)Os. They also showed that these modulations consist mainly of the displacements of tellurium atoms and the observed modulations were interpreted in terms of valence fluctuations between the Au^{+} and Au^{3+}. According to Schutte and DeBoer, those displacements also affect the coordination number of calaverite.

In 2009, Bindi et al. concluded that the different coordination numbers associated with calaverite were indeed associated with a significant differentiation in the valence sum of Au, and that the random distribution of Ag suppresses the fluctuation of Au^{+} and Au^{3+}, whereas the ordered distribution reinforces it.

== Occurrence ==
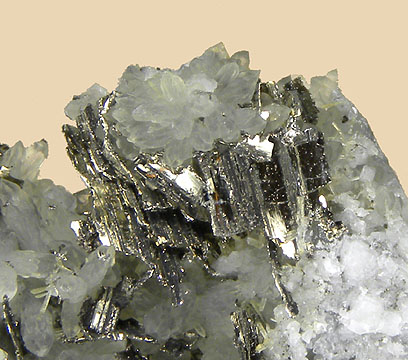
Calaverite from the Cresson Mine, Cripple Creek, Colorado. Largest crystal is 9 mm

Calaverite occurrences include Cripple Creek, Colorado, Calaveras County, California, US (from where it gets its name), Nagyag, Romania, Kirkland Lake Gold District, Ontario, Rouyn District, Quebec, and Kalgoorlie, Australia.

=== History ===
Calaverite was first recognized and obtained in 1861 from the Stanislaus Mine, Carson Hill, Angels Camp, in Calaveras Co., California. It was named for the County of origin by chemist and mineralogist Frederick Augustus Genth who differentiated it from the known gold telluride mineral sylvanite, and formally reported it as a new gold mineral in 1868. Genth found that the telluride formula for calaverite generally corresponded with the gold-silver telluride mineral sylvanite, but had a far lower percentage of ionic silver in place of ionic gold (3 to 3.5% in Genth's analysis, vs. 11 to 13% silver typical for sylvanite). Since silver is isomorphous with gold in telluride minerals (i.e. gold atoms replace silver without automatically changing the crystal character), Genth more importantly reported the calaverite differed from sylvanite in having no distinct crystalline cleavage line, whereas sylvanite was known to have a distinct line of cleavage. (As discussed above, both sylvanite and calaverite have since been found to be basically monoclinic, whereas the third known gold-silver telluride mineral krennerite is orthorhombic, with yet a different characteristic line of cleavage parallel to the crystal base). Genth was later also able to characterize a sample of calaverite from Boulder, Colorado, finding that his two specimens from that location were 2.04 and 3.03% silver.

In the initial phase of the Kalgoorlie gold rush in Western Australia in 1893, large amounts of calaverite were initially mistaken for fool's gold, and were discarded. The mineral deposits were used as a building material, and for the filling of potholes and ruts. Several years later, the nature of the mineral was identified, leading to a second gold rush of 1896 that included excavating the town's streets.

== See also ==
- Telluride (chemistry)
