= Sylvanite =

Silver gold telluride

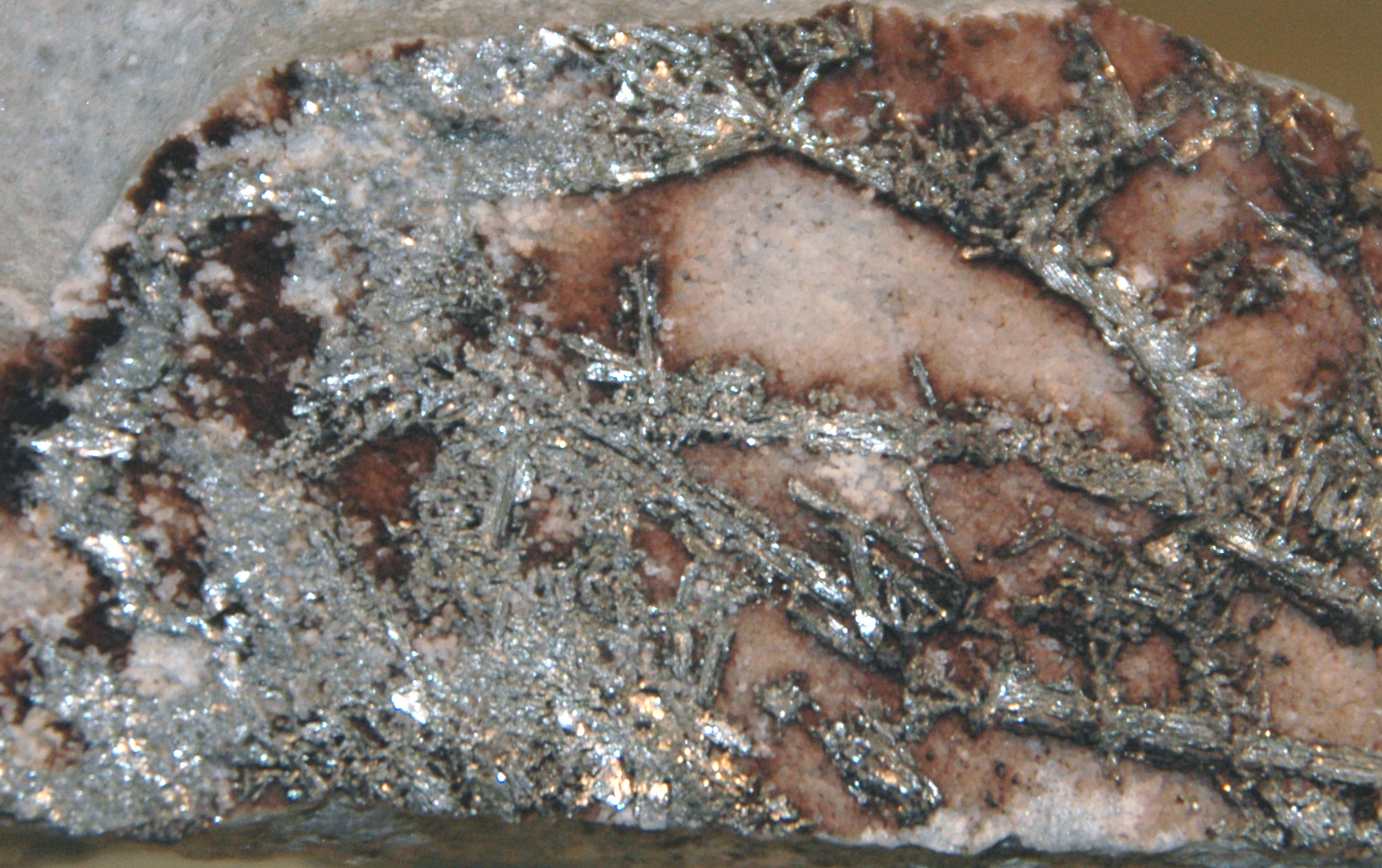
- Sylvanite from the Cripple Creek mining district

General
- Category: Telluride mineral
- Formula: (Ag,Au)Te_{2}
- IMA symbol: Syv
- Strunz classification: 2.EA.05
- Crystal system: Monoclinic
- Crystal class: Prismatic (2/m) (same H-M symbol)
- Space group: P2/c

Identification
- Formula mass: 429.89 g/mol
- Color: Silver-grey, silver-white
- Crystal habit: Massive to crystalline
- Cleavage: Perfect on the {010}
- Fracture: Uneven
- Tenacity: Brittle
- Mohs scale hardness: 1.5–2
- Luster: Metallic
- Streak: Steel grey
- Diaphaneity: Opaque
- Specific gravity: 8.2
- Density: 8.1
- Optical properties: Anisotropic
- Pleochroism: None
- Ultraviolet fluorescence: None

Sylvanite or silver gold telluride, chemical formula (Ag,Au)Te_{2}, is the most common telluride of gold.

== Properties ==
The gold:silver ratio varies from 3:1 to 1:1. It is a metallic mineral with a color that ranges from a steely gray to almost white. It is closely related to calaverite, which is more purely gold telluride with 3% silver. Sylvanite crystallizes in the monoclinic 2/m system. Crystals are rare and it is usually bladed or granular. It is very soft with a hardness of 1.5–2. It has a high relative density of 8–8.2. Sylvanite is photosensitive and can accumulate a dark tarnish if it is exposed to bright light for too long.

== Occurrence ==
Sylvanite is found in Transylvania, from which its name is partially derived. It is also found and mined in Australia in the East Kalgoorlie district. In Canada it is found in the Kirkland Lake Gold District, Ontario and the Rouyn District, Quebec. In the United States it occurs in California and in Colorado where it was mined as part of the Cripple Creek ore deposit. Sylvanite is associated with native gold, quartz, fluorite, rhodochrosite, pyrite, acanthite, nagyagite, calaverite, krennerite, and other rare telluride minerals. It is found most commonly in low temperature hydrothermal vein deposits.

== Use ==
Sylvanite represents a minor ore of gold and tellurium. Sylvanium, an obsolete term for tellurium, derived its name from sylvanite.
