= Silver glance =

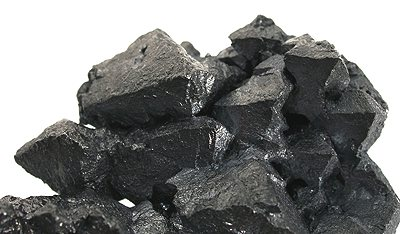
- Acanthite-Argentite (Morocco)

General
- Category: Minerals

Silver glance (German: Silberglanz) is a trivial name used among collectors and mineral traders, as well as miners, geologists and representatives of related craft professions for at least two ore minerals, silver sulfides. It may refer to:

- Acanthite, monoclinic silver sulfide, one of the most famous silver ore minerals.
- Argentite, silver sulfide of the orthorhombic system, one of the oldest silver ore minerals.

In addition, there are several more mixed minerals, part of the name of which is also silver glance:

- Antimony-silver glance (German: Antimonsilberglanz) — Stephanite
- Black silver glance (German: Schwarzsilberglanz) — Stephanite
- Copper-silver glance (German: Kupfersilberglanz) — Stromeyerite
- Selen-silver glance (German: Selensilberglanz) — Naumannite
- Supple-silver glance (German: Schmiegsamsilberglanz) — Sternbergite
- Telluro-silver glance (German: Tellursilberglanz) — Hessite, Sylvanite oder Petzite

== Gallery ==
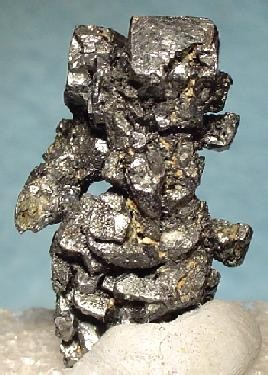
Acanthite
(silver glance)

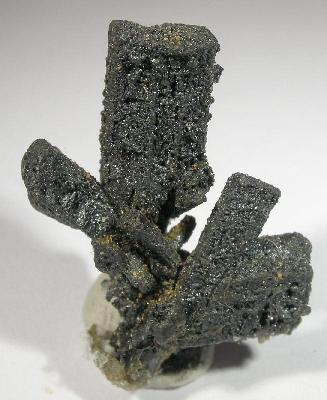
Argentite
(silver glance)

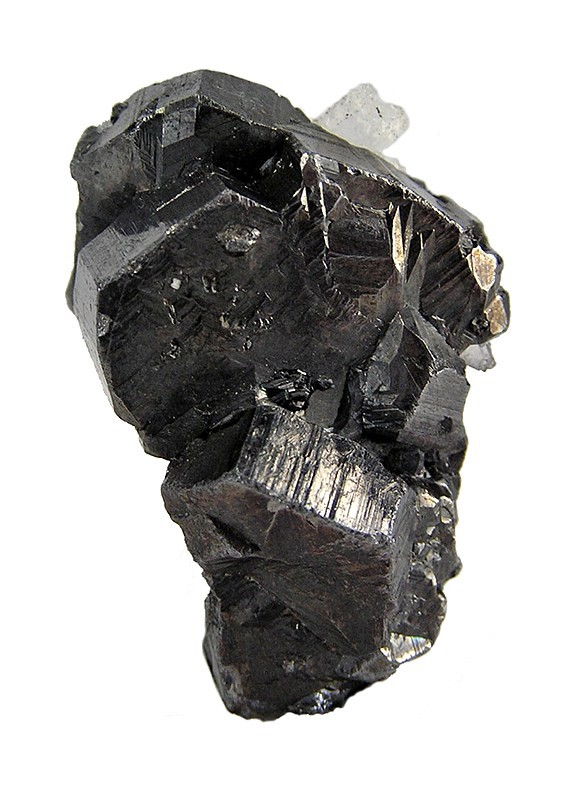
Stephanite
(antimony-silver glance)

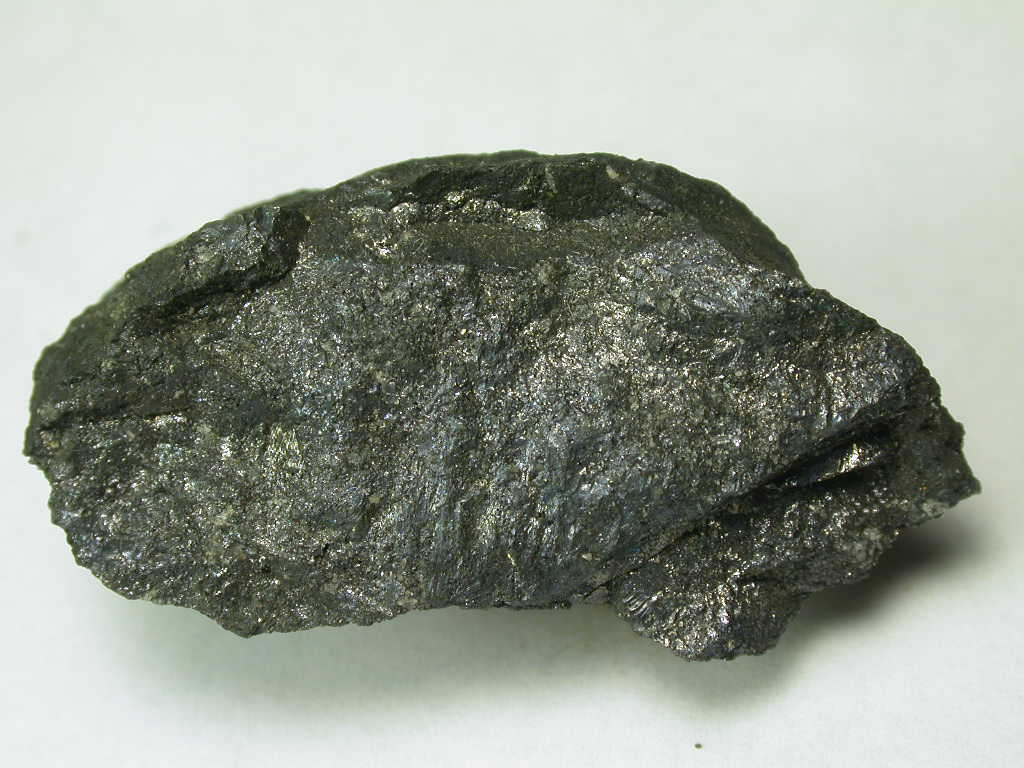
Stromeyerite
(copper-silver glance)

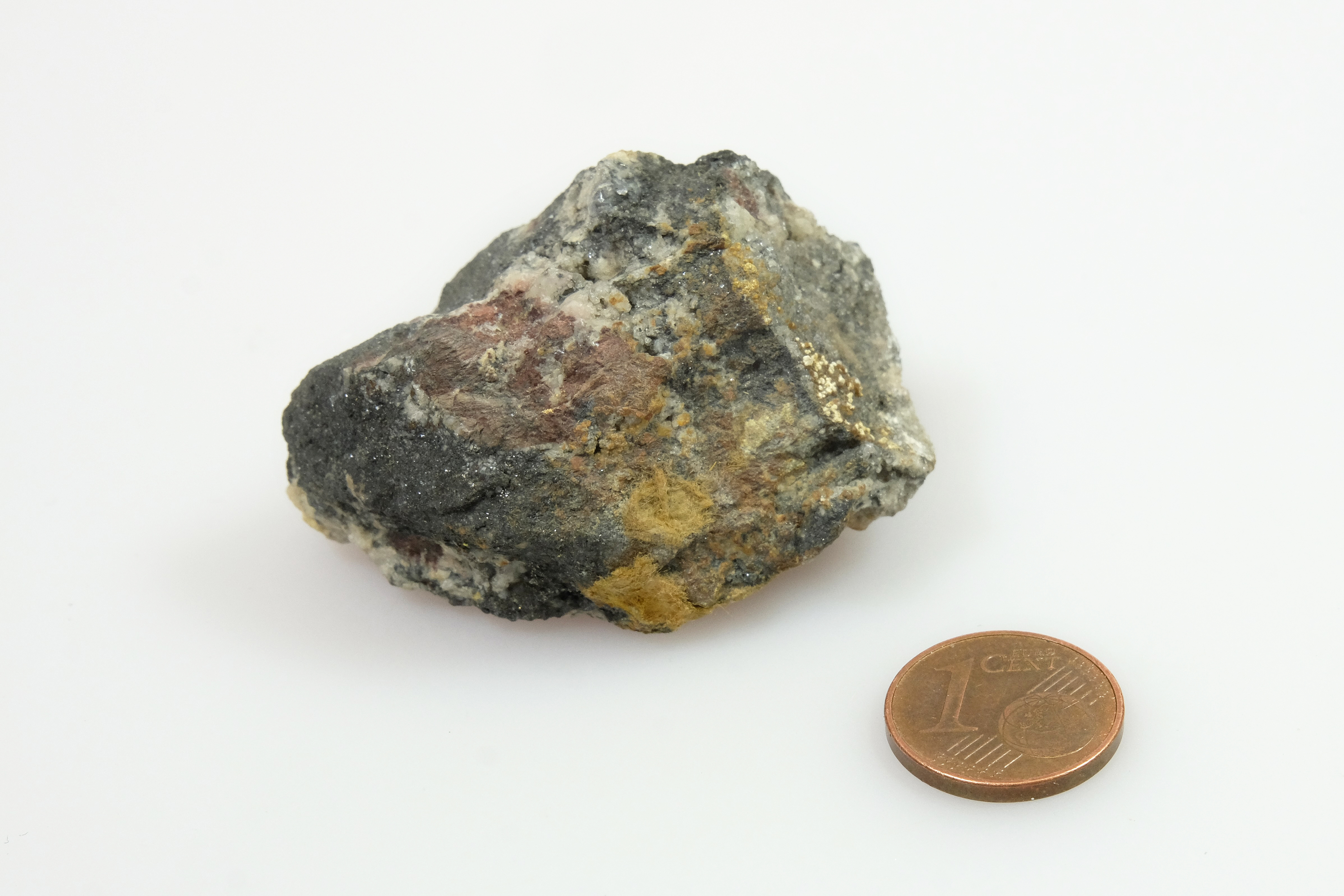
Naumannite
(selen-silver glance)

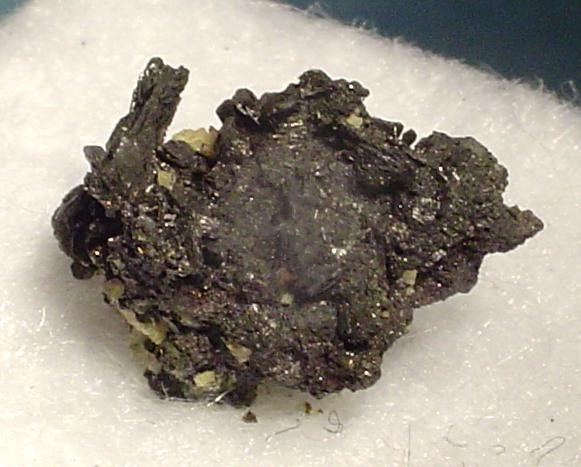
Sternbergite
(supple-silver glance)

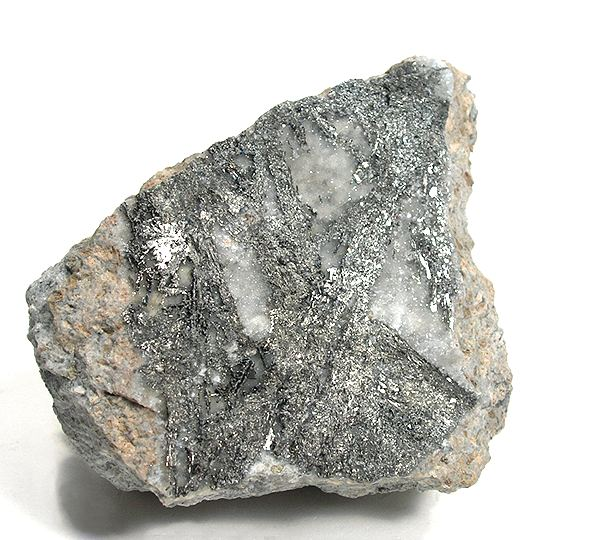
Sylvanite
(telluro-silver glance)

== See also ==
- Glance (disambiguation)
- Telluro-silver glance (disambiguation)
- Silver (disambiguation)
- Telluric silver (disambiguation)
- Glances
