= Glances =

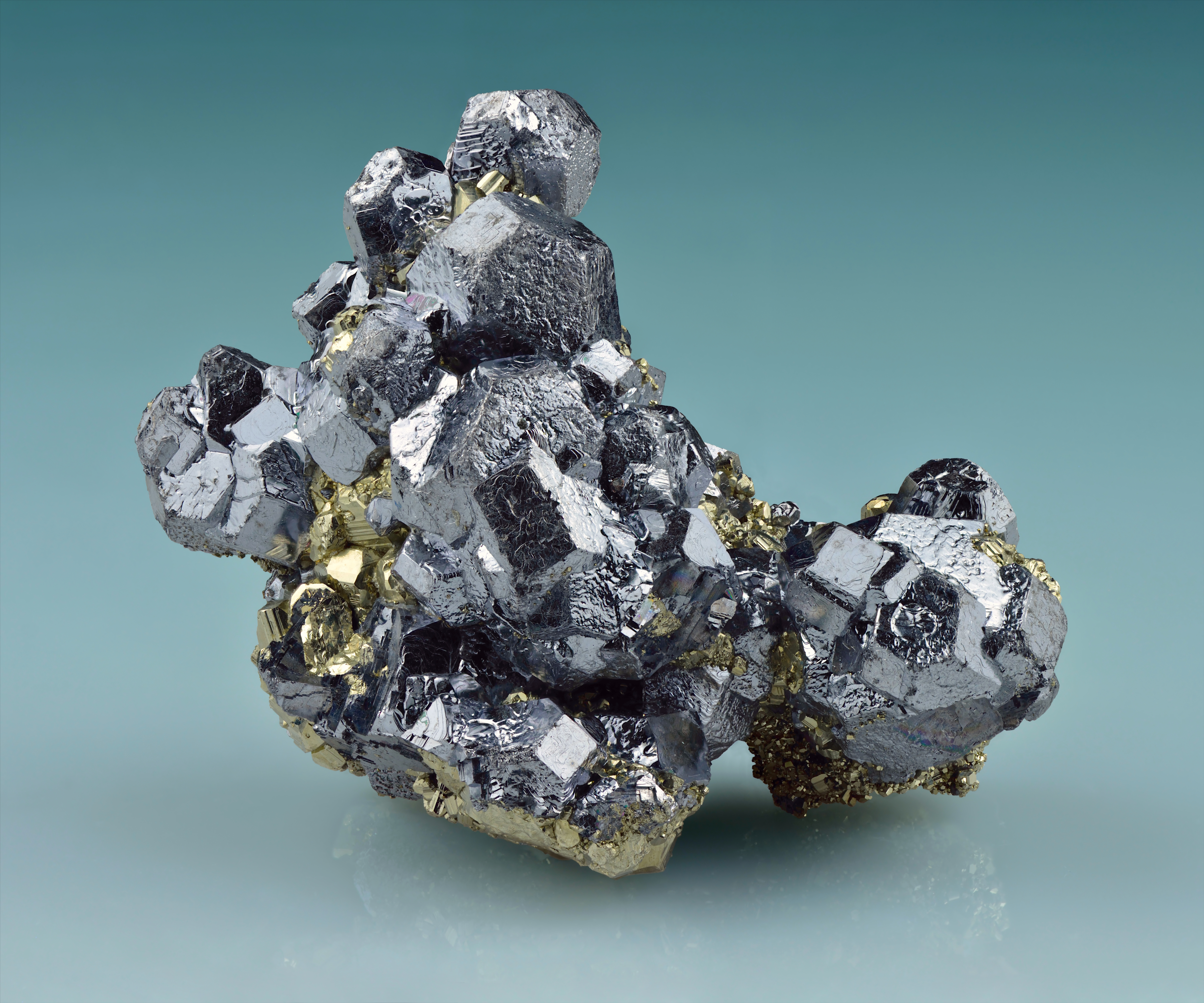
- Galena, which gave the group its name

General
- Category: Sulfide minerals, galenoides
- Crystal system: Cubic or cuboctahedral

Identification
- Color: Lead gray, silvery, metallic white, gray & no specific color
- Crystal habit: usually cubic or cuboctahedral, blocky, tabular and sometimes skeletal crystals
- Twinning: Contact, penetration and lamellar
- Mohs scale hardness: 2-3 (rarely up to 6)
- Luster: Metallic on cleavage planes
- Diaphaneity: Opaque
- Optical properties: Isotropic and opaque
- Other characteristics: Natural semiconductor

Glance or glances (German: glanz, glanze), sometimes also galenoids (similar to galena) — obsolete or partially obsolete collective name for the morphological group of minerals, compiled according to external characteristics. The group included more than three dozen names, mainly from the group of sulfides and related compounds. As a rule, different examples of glosses have a gray mirror or metallic luster with refractive indices above 3, and sometimes a metallike appearance.

Unlike the related pyrites or blendes, glosses are not considered ″colored″ because they do not have the yellowish or reddish ″copper″ tones, although impurities may well give individual varieties shades of color.

The group of glances was formed spontaneously by miners and mining practitioners, but mineralogy as a science recognized this group until the mid-twentieth century. However, even in the 17th-19th centuries, at a time when luster or pyrites were considered generally accepted scientific terms, mineralogists treated them without due categorical rigor, understanding them purely broadly as a morphological group united by external characteristics. For example, one of the most famous glances (iron) is not a sulfide, but an iron oxide.

With the gradual development of inorganic chemistry and ideas about the structure of minerals, the group of shines lost its meaning, although the old names of minerals, having turned into trivial names, remained in the speech of specialists of various professions: prospecting geologists, miners, artisans, amateurs and collectors of minerals.

== Characteristics of the group ==
The group of lusters includes mainly sulfides of heavy and transition metals, which have a metallic or mirror-like luster when freshly fractured. The group was composed according to external characteristics, and the most famous minerals of the luster group, by their appearance, immediately give an approximate idea of it. These include: lead glance (galena), copper (chalcocite), antimony (stibnite), molybdenum (molybdenite), as well as cobalt (cobaltine), silver (stephanite) and some others.

All of the listed minerals have a metallic glance, dark color and the same feature, low hardness (from 1 to 3, rarely higher). In addition, they attract attention with their increased thermal conductivity (they cool the hand). They all contain sulfide sulfur (S^{2-}) as an anion, sometimes mixed with similar compounds of arsenic or antimony. Most sulfide-type minerals are characterized by a high reflectance (in the range of 50-35%) and, with a few exceptions, appear white or gray in reflected light under a microscope. Most lusters are ore minerals, from which the titular metals included in their composition (in particular, copper, lead, molybdenum, antimony) are isolated on an industrial scale.

In the 16th-18th centuries, a group of glances had a utilitarian and, partly, chaotic character. Formed primarily on the basis of the appearance of ores known in Europe, it included many shiny metallic minerals, which miners and miners traditionally called by this word (glances or German: glanz). Knowledge of the chemical composition of these minerals was extremely superficial and could not clarify the most important structural details of their internal structure. As a result, substances that had a clear commonality according to two or three main criteria were brought together into one group:

1) conspicuous metallic (metalloid) appearance, with a characteristic metallic lustre;
2) heavy, giving a color streak, more or less quickly fading or decomposing in the air;
3) easily releasing the metal contained in them and therefore traditionally serving as ores.

In full accordance with the properties indicated above, many minerals received special group names from mineralogists already in the 16th–18th centuries. Thus, already at the beginning of the 18th century they were firmly united into visual and recognizable groups of glances, pyrites, etc.

The most important role in the interpretation and ordering of the group of sulfide minerals was played by Jöns Jacob Berzelius. In his chemical-mineralogical study of 1843, he hypothesized that sulfur, being, like oxygen, an electronegative element, is capable of forming sulfonic acid bases with electropositive elements, and sulfides (similar to anhydrides) with electronegative ones. Sulfur bases and sulfo bases, when combined with sulfides, give sulfosalts, which in their chemical formula are similar to oxygen salts in which the oxygen atom is replaced by sulfur. Similar to sulfur, selenium and, to a lesser extent, tellurium also have the same ability to replace oxygen in all similar substances. Based on the results of his research, Berzelius combined four elements (the future group of chalcogens: O, S, Se and Te) as corpora amphogenia, that is, on the basis of substances capable of combining with metals to give their compounds the character of bases and acidic oxides.

Based on the chemical hypothesis put forward, Berzelius transferred it to the field of mineralogy and created a separate group of sulfur minerals, mainly ore, similar to oxygen compounds. These substances have long been empirically grouped together by miners and practicing geologists on the basis of outward physical characteristics only, without any reference to their structure or chemical formula. The fact that Berzelius's new theory agreed in general terms with the traditional classification of mineralogists seemed to indicate that the classification of these minerals into one or more closely related groups was, in general, correct.

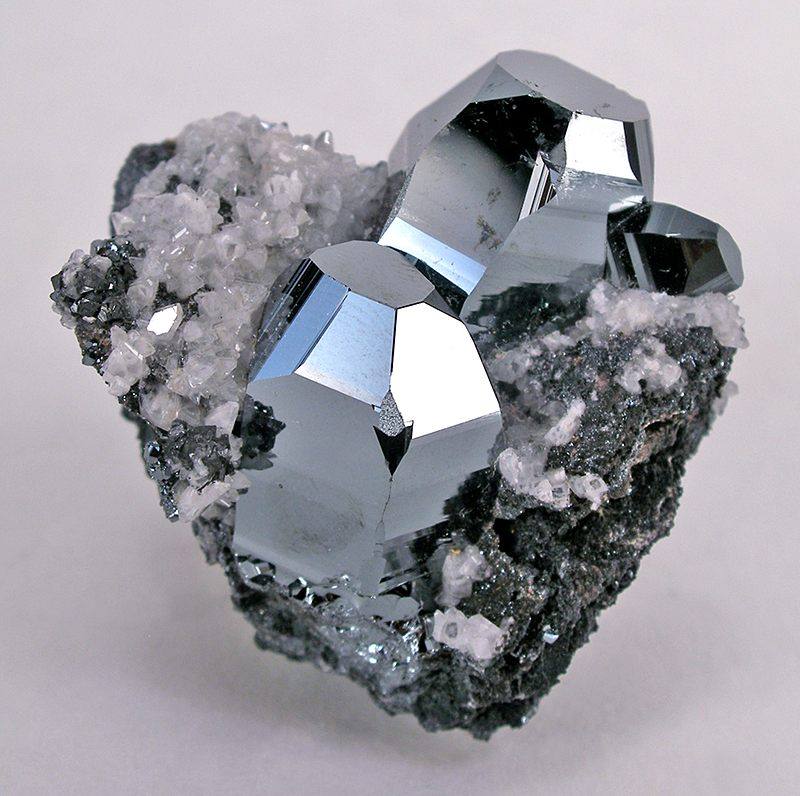
Iron glance

The chemical theory of the structure of sulfides by Berzelius in general terms confirmed the previous division of ores into lusters, pyrites and groups close to them, although it forced several significant amendments to be made. In particular, it was necessary to remove several non-sulfide lusters from here, or more precisely, oxygen minerals that were brought here based on external signs. First of all, this turned out to be perhaps the most famous of them, iron glance, which has the formula Fe_{2}О_{3}. At the same time, the need arose to add to this group a previously isolated group of minerals, which had previously been a subject of contention among empiricist mineralogists. We are talking about the so-called group of blends, which did not look like either glances or pyrites: their shine is not completely metallic, the weight is not so heavy, the line is sometimes not colored, and the metal is often difficult to stand out.

In the first third of the 20th century, groups of minerals, united by external characteristics, finally lost their scientific relevance. However, many traditional names remain alive. They were firmly entrenched in old, well-known ores and retained their relevance, first of all, beyond the boundaries of scientific mineralogy itself, — in industrial and economic practice, as well as in literary language. This phenomenon had obvious psychological roots. In particular, the property of metallic luster on the surface of a fresh fracture looks very clearly and literally catches the eye, which is highly characteristic of a number of ore minerals that are most important in practical terms. Thanks to this circumstance, many of the latter have been preserved for a long time (and are still called in German) according to this characteristic.

That is why, to this day, on the pages of various literature, including scientific literature, one can find chalcocite, stibnite or hematite under the old (now trivial) names: copper, antimony or iron glance.

== General properties ==
The metallic luster of the minerals of the group resembles the luster of the surface of a fresh fracture of metals. It is clearly visible only on the non-oxidized surface of the sample. Minerals that have a metallic luster are, as a result, opaque and heavier than minerals that have a non-metallic luster. Meanwhile, minerals of the group of glances are typical representatives of the sulfide class with all their chemical features. Most of them are chemically active, prone to rapid oxidation and retain a mirror or metallic luster of the fracture for a relatively short time. The latter circumstance is especially important to take into account when determining minerals from the group of lusters and pyrites.

The remaining general properties of glosses generally correspond to the external characteristics that were given to them by empirical mineralogy of the 17th-18th centuries. These are heavy (dense) minerals that have a high specific weight, give a color streak, and more or less quickly fade or decompose in air. All glances easily release the metal they contain and therefore are traditionally among the most famous metal ores, and also serve as a source of arsenic, antimony, selenium or tellurium included in them.

== The most famous varieties ==
The total number of minerals known as glances is several dozen, including the so-called mixed ones, which combine two or more metals. However, among the most famous, widespread and important in terms of ore lusters are the so-called "pure" minerals, in which the content of the base metal significantly exceeds impurities.

- Acicular bismuth glance — Aikinite.
- Antimony glance — Antimonite (synonim: Stibnite).
- Arsenicglance — Arsenolamprite.
- Avanturine glance — sour Plagioclase.
- Axotomous antimony glance — Bournonite or Jamesonite.
- Bismuth glance (German: wismutglanz) — Bismuthinite.
- Cobalt glance — Cobaltite.
- Copper-bismuth glance (German: kupferbismuthglanz) — Emplectite.
- Dystomic glance (German: dystomglanz) — Bournonite.
- Eugenic glance (German: eugenglanz) — Polybasite.
- Eutomy glance (German: eutomglanz) — Molybdenite.
- Graphic glance — Sylvanite.
- Iron glance — Hematite.
- Iron-stibium glance — Berthierite.
- Khalibin glance (German: chalybinglanz) — Jamesonite.
- Lead glance — Galena, which gave the group its name (Galenoides).
- Manganese glance — Alabandite.
- Mercury glance (German: merkurglanz) — Selenium metacinnabarite (selenium cinnabar).
- Molybden glance — Molybdenite.
- Nickel glance — Gersdorffite or Ullmannite.
- Tin-copper glance or Tin glance (German: zinnkupferglanz) — Stannite.
- Plusin glance, pleated glance (German: plusinglanz) — Argyrodite.
- Scaly glance (German: schappenglanz) — Franckeite.
- Silver glance (German: silberglanz) — Acanthite.
- Silver black glance (German: schwarzsilberglanz) — Stephanite.
- Tellurium glance (German: telluriumglanz, tellurglanz) — Nagyágite.
- Telluro-bismuth glance (German: telluriumwismutglanz, tellurwismutglanz) — Tetradymite.
- Telluro-silver glance (German: telluriumsilberglanz, tellursilberglanz) — Hessite or Sylvanite.
- Writing glance (German: schriftglanz) — Sylvanite.

== Deposits ==
As a rule, glances are formed and detectable in hydrothermal deposits of various temperature conditions. Local deposits of minerals of the glances group cannot be codified according to any common characteristic, since they are heterogeneous in their composition. They are scattered throughout the planet and correspond to those places in which ores of individual chemical elements are found, which also form the glance minerals that are part of the group.

== See also ==
- Lustre (mineralogy)
- Sulfide mineral
- Selenide minerals
- Telluride mineral
- Classification of non-silicate minerals
