= Axotomous antimony glance =

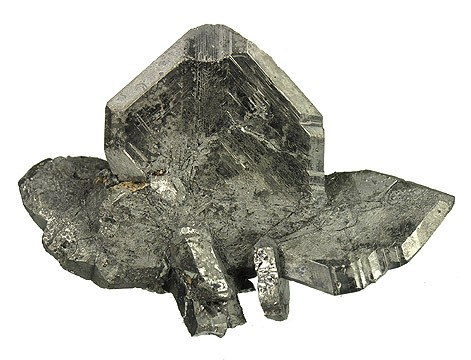
- Bournonite (Potosí, Bolivia)

General
- Category: Minerals

Axotomous antimony glance is a partially obsolete, now trivial name under which at least two related minerals from the subclass of sulfosalts (complex sulfides), containing antimony, lead and sulfur were known in mineralogy and mineragraphy. Moreover, all three words in the title had meaningful meaning from the point of view of scientific terminology.

Axotomic, axotomous (German: axotomatisch) meant that the mineral had a so-called perfect cleavage in a certain direction, giving a plane of easy fracture.
Antimony meant that the mineral contains a significant amount of antimony and is of interest as a natural mineral stibnite of one or more metals.
Glance meant not just the presence of a metallic luster (shine) on the surface of a mineral, but, first of all, belonging to a broad morphological group of minerals, the so-called glances.

== Historical description ==
In his “Treatise on mineralogy” of 1825, also called “The natural history of the mineral kingdom”, Friedrich Mohs gave only two mineralogical synonyms for axotomous antimony glance: Prismatoidal Antimony-Glance or Grey Antimony (with the note: “in part”), since the latter name, including also the longer version gray antimony ore, often also meant other ores, primarily stibnite.

Mohs indicated an unequal-sided tetrahedral pyramid as the main crystalline form for antimony luster, and its cleavage, no doubt, was very perfect — axotomic (according to the basic definition of a mineral). The chemical formula of the mineral was not given, but in the afterword to In describing the mineral, Mohs noted that “nothing as yet known” about the proportions of the individual components of this mineral species, except that it contains sulfur, antimony and lead: “The axotomous Antimony-glance seems to be a rare mineral, or at least not sufficiently attended to by mineralogists. It occurs in masses of considerable dimensions in Cornwall, sometimes along with the di-prismate Copperglance.”

Ten years later, James Dana, in his new system of mineralogy, returned to the question of the composition and properties of this mineral, calling it jamesonite or axotomic antimony glance. Among the properties of the mineral, James Dana especially notes a typical analytical reaction: “before the blowpipe, in an open tube, it affords a dense white smoke of oxyd of antimony”. Having indicated the detailed percentage composition of the content of individual elements in the mineral (according to Heinrich Rose), however, he does not provide a formula, noting that jamesonite “it occurs principally in Cornwall, associated with quartz and minute crystals of Bournonite”.

In 1856, the English mineralogist James Tennant in his fundamental reference book “Mineralogy and Crystallography”, summing up the development of science until the middle of the 19th century, gives only one (main) synonym for the mineral jamesonite — axotomous antimony glance, providing its chemical formula 3PbS + 2SbS^{3}, prismatic and a brief listing of mineralogy and crystallographic properties. At the end there is a short explanation from the field of analytical chemistry: “<jamsonite> decomposed by warm hydrochloric acid, forming same of lead”, as well as an important clarification: “found sometimes with bournonite”.

== Essential minerals ==
- Bournonite (also berthonite, volchite or dystomic glance) — mineral of the subclass of complex sulfides, composition copper-lead sulfoantimonide with the calculation formula CuPbSbS_{3}.
- Jamesonite (also domingite, comuccite, pfaffite, gray antimony or feather ore) — mineral of the subclass of complex ribbon sulfides, according to the composition of iron-lead sulfoantimonide with the calculation formula Pb_{4}FeSb_{6}S_{14}.

== Gallery ==
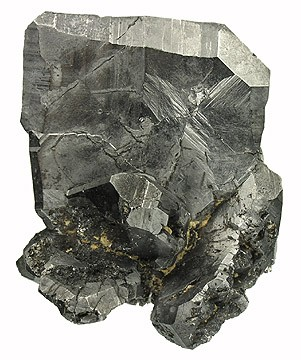
Bournonite

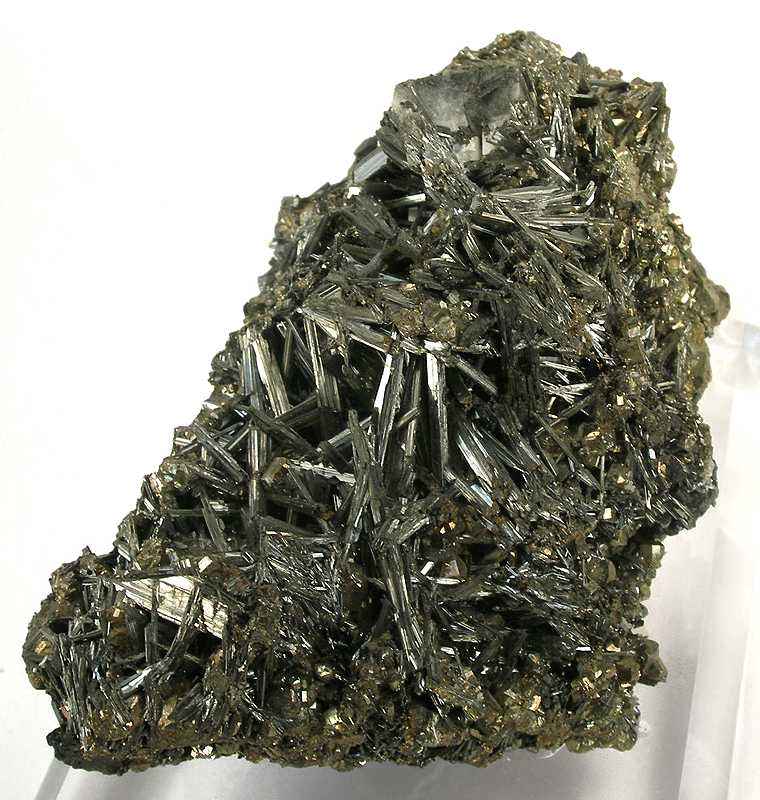
Jamesonite

== See also ==
- Silver glance
- Nickel glance
- Glances
- Glance (disambiguation)
- Telluro-silver glance (disambiguation)
