= Aguilarite =

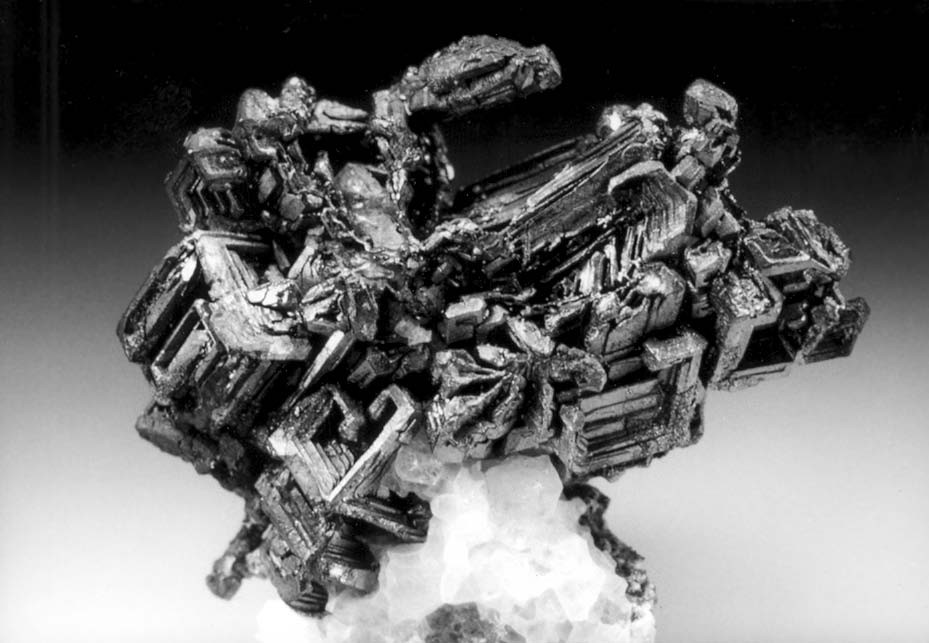
- Aguilarite – San Carlos Mine, La Luz, Guanajuato municipality, Mexico. Specimen height is 3.9 cm.

General
- Category: Sulfosalt minerals
- Formula: Ag_{4}SeS
- IMA symbol: Agu
- Strunz classification: 2.BA.55
- Dana classification: 2.4.1.3
- Crystal system: Monoclinic
- Crystal class: Prismatic (2/m) (same H-M symbol)
- Space group: P2_{1}/n
- Unit cell: a = 4.2478(2), b =6.9432(3) c = 8.0042(5) [Å] β = 100.103(2)° Z = 4

Identification
- Color: Bright lead-gray on fresh surfaces; dull iron-black on exposure to air.
- Cleavage: None observed
- Fracture: Hackly
- Tenacity: Sectile
- Mohs scale hardness: 2.5 1–1.5
- Luster: Metallic
- Streak: Gray-black
- Diaphaneity: Opaque
- Ultraviolet fluorescence: Non-fluorescent

Aguilarite is an uncommon sulfosalt mineral with formula Ag_{4}SeS. It was described in 1891 and named for discoverer Ponciano Aguilar.

== Description ==
Aguilarite is bright lead-gray on fresh surfaces but becomes dull iron black when exposed to air. The mineral occurs with massive habit, as elongated pseudododecahedral crystals up to 3 cm (1.2 in), or as intergrowths with acanthite or naumannite.

== Discovery ==
In the late 19th century, Ponciano Aguilar, superintendent of the San Carlos mine in Guanajuato, Mexico, found several specimens of a mineral thought to be naumannite. The samples were given to F. A. Genth for identification, who, along with S. L. Penfield, discovered that it was a new mineral. The mineral was described in the American Journal of Science in 1891 and named aguilarite in honor of Ponciano Aguilar. When the International Mineralogical Association was founded, aguilarite was grandfathered as a valid mineral species.

== Occurrence ==
Aguilarite is uncommon, and forms at relatively low temperatures in hydrothermal deposits rich in silver and selenium but deficient in sulfur. The mineral is known from a number of countries in North and South America, Europe, Asia, and Australasia. Aguilarite occurs in association with acanthite, calcite, naumannite, pearceite, proustite, silver, stephanite, and quartz.

== Chemistry and structure ==
In 2013, aguilarite's chemistry and crystal structure were reexamined by Bindi and Pingitore. The significant reevaluation of aguilarite did not discredit its status as a valid mineral, but it was established as the selenium analogue of acanthite instead of sulfur-rich naumannite. The sample primarily studied came from the Gem and Mineral Collection of the Department of Geosciences at Princeton University.

The work of Petruk et al. in 1974 formed the basis of knowledge regarding the silver–sulfur–selenium system for about forty years. They indexed their x-ray diffraction patterns of aguilarite on an orthorhombic cell similar to naumannite. Bindi and Pingitore determined that aguilarite is, in fact, monoclinic and is isostructural to acanthite and not naumannite. Bindi and Pingitore believe that Petruk et al. were unable to resolve closely spaced peaks due to low resolution equipment, making aguilarite appear similar to naumannite. Additionally, a number of inconsistencies in unit cell dimensions in the 1974 work show that aguilarite does not have the same structure as naumannite.

The crystal structure of aguilarite consists of planes nearly parallel to (010) composed of tetrahedrally coordinated nonmetal atoms and AgX_{3} triangles (where X is a nonmetal). The planes are joined by twofold-coordinated silver atoms.

Aguilarite is part of the acanthite-like solid solution series Ag_{2}S–Ag_{2}S_{0.4}Se_{0.6}. The mineral comprises the range from 50 atomic percent selenium up to the transition from monoclinic to orthorhombic.

== See also ==
- List of minerals
