= Telluric silver =

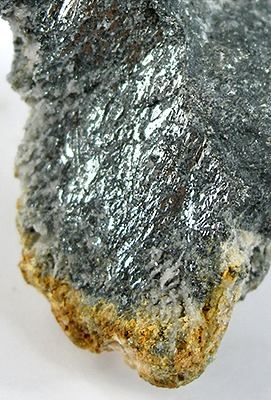
- Telluric silver and tellurium (Sonora, Mexico)

General
- Category: Minerals

Telluric silver (German: telluriumsilber, tellursilber) — is an obsolete trivial name, which collectors and mineral traders, miners, geologists and representatives of other applied professions actually applied to several rare ore minerals, tellurides of silver, as well as to chemical compounds of similar composition. It may refer to:

== In mineralogy ==
- Telluric silver or telluric silver glance — is Hessite, a rare ore mineral, silver telluride. Discovered and described in 1829, in the mines of Western Altai.
- Telluric silver or telluric silver-gold glance — is Petzite, a rare ore mineral close to hessite, a mixed telluride of silver and gold.
- Telluric silver (rare) or telluric silver glance — Sylvanite, a rare ore mineral mixed with gold and silver telluride, first found and described in Transylvania and was named after the place where it was discovered.
- Telluric silver (rare) or telluric silver blende — Empressite, a rare ore mineral, also silver telluride in composition. Discovered and described in 1914, at the Empress Josephine mine (English: Empress Josephine), Colorado.
- Telluric silver (rare) — Stützite, a rare ore mineral, also silver telluride in composition. Discovered and described in 1951 using a museum sample of a mineral from the Sacarambe mine (Romania).

== Gallery ==
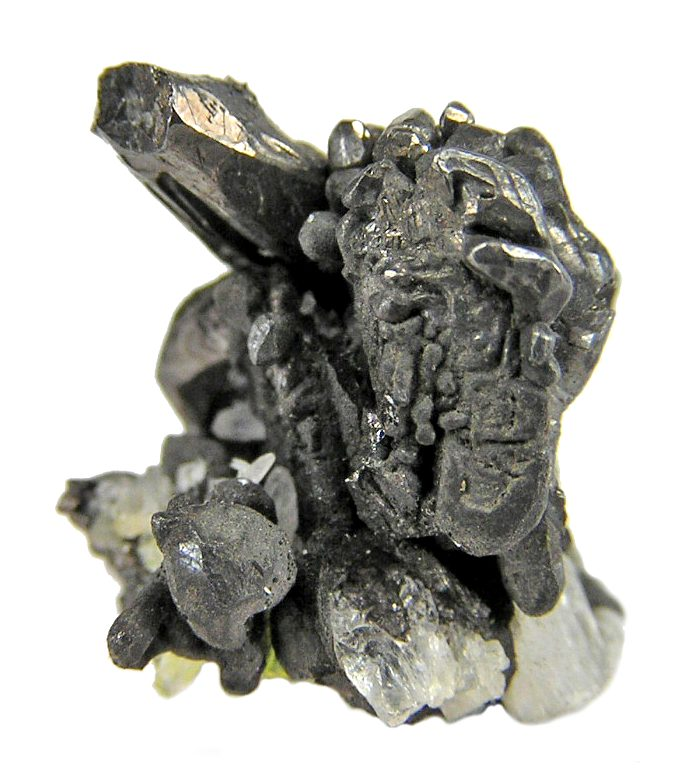
Hessite

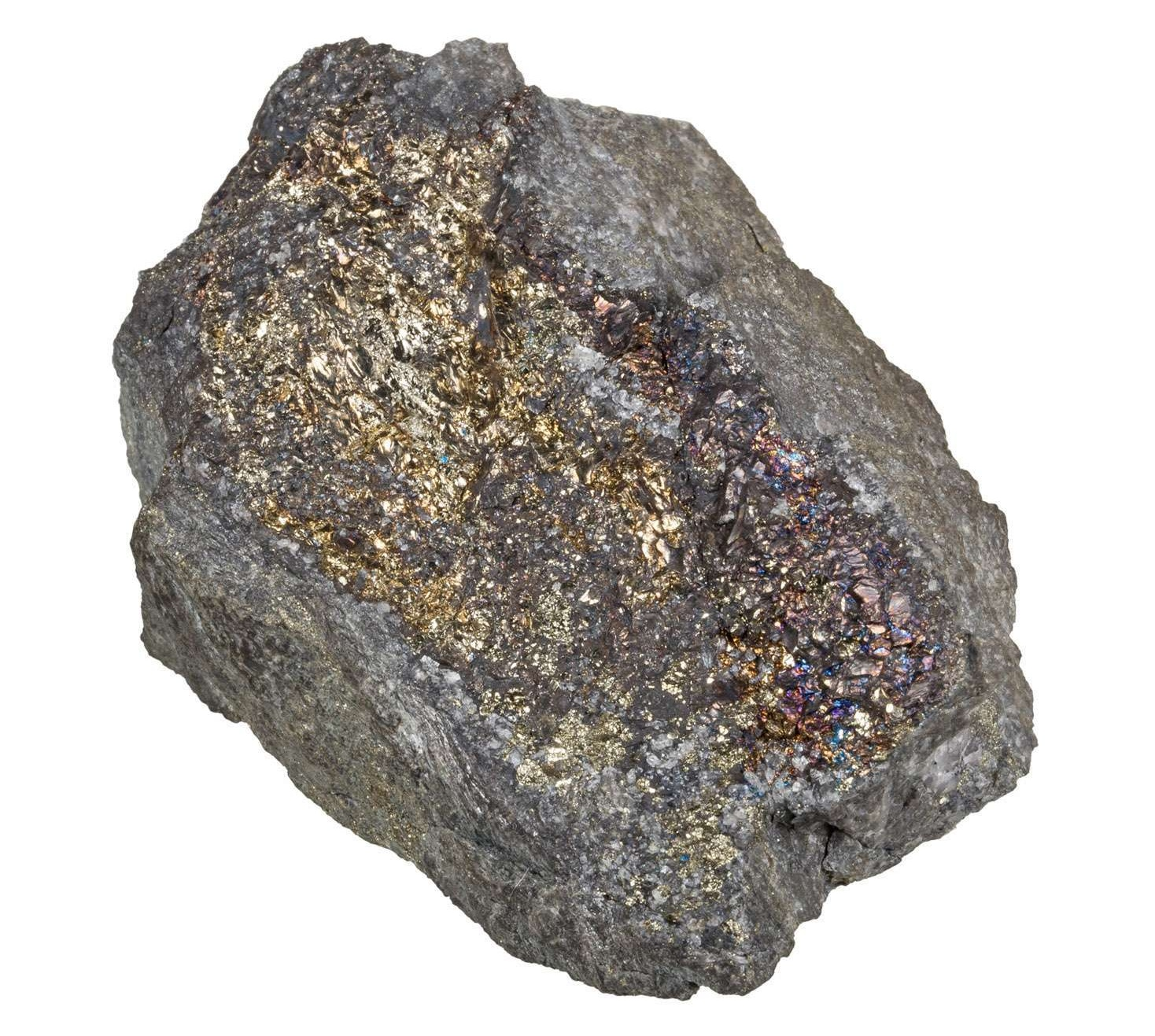
Petzite

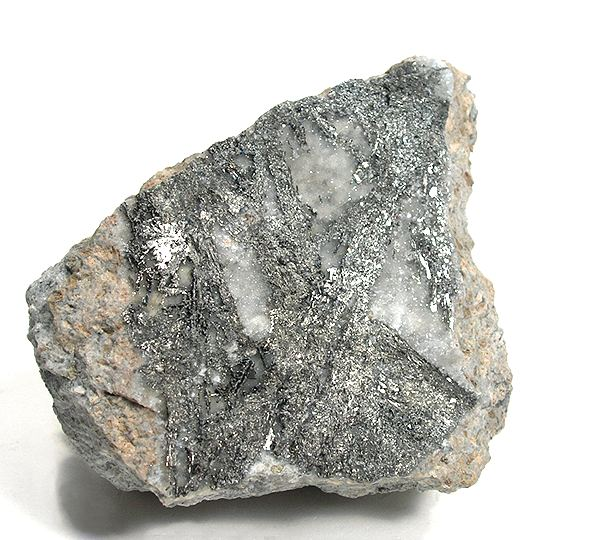
Sylvanite

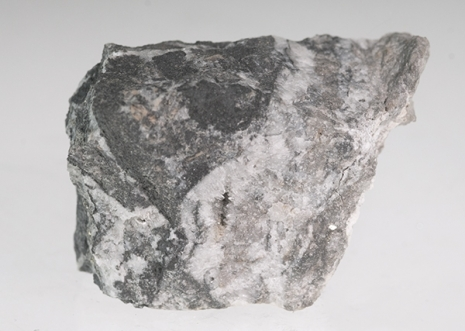
Empressite

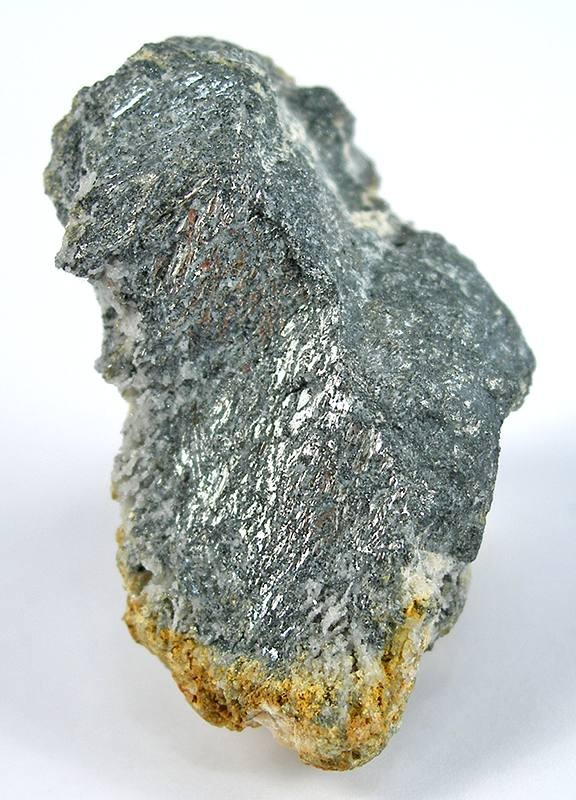
Stützite

== In chemistry ==
- Telluric silver — silver telluride, a binary inorganic compound of silver and tellurium, fawn crystals with the formula AgTe, — conditionally corresponding to the mineral Empressite.
- Telluric silver — silver telluride, a binary inorganic compound of silver and tellurium, gray or black crystals with the formula Ag_{2}Te, — conditionally corresponding to the mineral Hessite.
- Telluric silver — pentasilver tritelluride, a binary inorganic compound of silver and tellurium, dark crystals with the formula Ag_{5}Te_{3}, — conditionally corresponding to the mineral Stützite.

== See also ==
- Telluro-silver glance
- Tellurium
- Silver (disambiguation)
- Glances
