= Silver telluride =

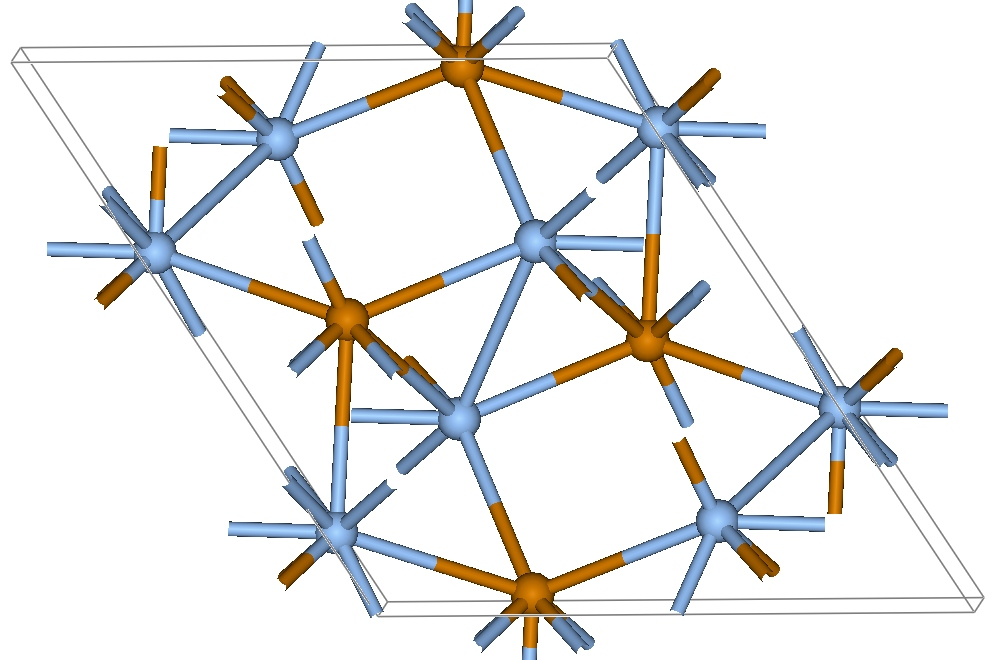
- Silver telluride

Names
- Other names Hessite

Identifiers
CAS Number	12002-99-2
3D model (JSmol)	Interactive image
ChemSpider	21170813
ECHA InfoCard	100.031.277
EC Number	234-419-7
PubChem CID	6914515
CompTox Dashboard (EPA)	DTXSID501045482
- InChI: InChI=1S/2Ag.Te Key: YRXWPCFZBSHSAU-UHFFFAOYSA-N
- SMILES: [Ag][Te][Ag]

Properties
Chemical formula	Ag_{2}Te
Molar mass	341.3364 g/mol
Appearance	grey-black crystals
Density	8.318 g/cm^{3}
Melting point	955 °C (1,751 °F; 1,228 K)
Refractive index (n_{D})	3.4

Structure
Crystal structure	Monoclinic, mP12
Space group	P2_{1}/c, No. 14

Related compounds
Related compounds	Silver selenide; Silver sulfide
- Except where otherwise noted, data are given for materials in their standard state (at 25 °C [77 °F], 100 kPa). verify (what is ?) Infobox references

Silver telluride (Ag_{2}Te) is a chemical compound, a telluride of silver, also known as disilver telluride or silver(I) telluride. It forms a monoclinic crystal. In a wider sense, silver telluride can be used to denote AgTe (silver(II) telluride, a metastable compound) or Ag_{5}Te_{3}.

== Properties ==
Silver telluride is a semiconductor which can be doped both n-type and p-type. Stoichiometric Ag_{2}Te has n-type conductivity. On heating silver is lost from the material.

Non-stoichiometric silver telluride has shown extraordinary magnetoresistance.

== Occurrence ==
Silver(I) telluride occurs naturally as the mineral hessite, whereas silver(II) telluride is known as empressite. A silver gold telluride occurs as sylvanite.

== Synthesis ==
Porous silver telluride (AgTe) is synthesized by an electrochemical deposition method. A potentiostat and a three-electrode cell with sulfuric acid electrolyte containing Ag nanoparticles at are used. A silver paste used in the tungsten ditelluride (WTe_{2}) attachment leaches into the electrolyte, causing Ag to dissolve in the electrolyte. The electrolyte is stirred to remove hydrogen bubbles. A silver-silver chloride electrode and a platinum wire can be used as reference and counter electrodes. In order to grow the porous AgTe, the WTe_{2} is treated with cyclic voltammetry.

Glutathione-coated Ag_{2}Te nanoparticles can be synthesized by preparing a solution containing AgNO_{3}, Na_{2}TeO_{3}, and glutathione. N_{2}H_{4} is added under stirring in an ice bath. The resulting product is washed for purification.

== General references ==
- Aliev, F. F. (2002). "Phase Transition of Ag_Enriched Ag_{2}Te". Inorganic Materials. 38 (10): 995–997. doi:10.1023/A:1020512918319. S2CID 91815176.
- Chuprakov, I. S.; Dahmen, K. H. (1998). "Large positive magnetoresistance in thin films of silver telluride". Applied Physics Letters. 72 (17): 2165. Bibcode:1998ApPhL..72.2165C. doi:10.1063/1.121309.
- Dalven, Richard (1966). "Fundamental Optical Absorption in Î²-Silver Telluride". Physical Review Letters. 16 (8): 311. Bibcode:1966PhRvL..16..311D. doi:10.1103/PhysRevLett.16.311.
- Hagyeong Kwon, Dongyeon Bae, Dongyeun Won, Heeju Kim, Gunn Kim, Jiung Cho, Hee Jung Park, Hionsuck Baik, Ah Reum Jeong, Chia-Hsien Lin, Ching-Yu Chiang, Ching-Shun Ku, Heejun Yang, and Suyeon Cho "Nanoporous Silver Telluride for active hydrogen evolution." (n.d.) https://pubs.acs.org/doi/10.1021/acsnano.0c09517
