= Glancy =

Glancy is a surname. Notable people with the surname include:

- Adam Scott Glancy, game designer
- Bertrand Glancy (1882–1953), Irish-born British colonial administrator
- Christopher Glancy (born 1960), Catholic bishop in Belize
- Daniel Glancy (born 1988), Irish professional tennis player
- Diane Glancy (born 1941), American poet, author and playwright
- Harry Glancy (1904–2002), American swimmer
- James Glancy (born 1982), British television presenter, conservationist and politician
- Jehu Glancy Jones (1811–1878), Ambassador of the United States
- Lawrence Glancy, Scottish footballer
- Michael Glancy (1950–2020), American glass artist
- Tom Glancy (1894–1949), Scottish footballer

== See also ==
- Glancey
