= Lutetium(III) selenide =

Identifiers
CAS Number	12163-21-2
3D model (JSmol)	Interactive image
ChemSpider	145822
ECHA InfoCard	100.032.086
EC Number	235-308-6
PubChem CID	166644
CompTox Dashboard (EPA)	DTXSID70923898
- InChI: InChI=1S/2Lu.3Se/q2*+3;3*-2 Key: JLNSXPFEELLOLT-UHFFFAOYSA-N
- SMILES: [Se-2].[Se-2].[Se-2].[Lu+3].[Lu+3]

Properties
Chemical formula	Lu_{2}Se_{3}
Molar mass	586.847 g·mol^{−1}
Appearance	grey
- Except where otherwise noted, data are given for materials in their standard state (at 25 °C [77 °F], 100 kPa). Infobox references

Lutetium(III) selenide is an inorganic compound with the chemical formula Lu_{2}Se_{3}.

== Preparation ==
Lutetium(III) selenide can be obtained by reacting lutetium and selenium:

2 Lu + 3 Se → Lu_{2}Se_{3}

It can also be prepared by reacting lutetium oxide and hydrogen selenide at a high temperature:

Lu_{2}O_{3} + 3 H_{2}Se → Lu_{2}Se_{3} + 3 H_{2}O

== Properties ==
Lutetium(III) selenide can form orthorhombic AgLuSe_{2} in the binary system of silver selenide. It can form Lu_{2}PbSe_{4} and Lu_{2}Pb_{4}Se_{7} in the binary system of lead selenide.
