= Glancey =

Glancey is a surname. Notable people with the surname include:

- Jonathan Glancey, British architectural critic and writer
- Paul Glancey, British video game producer and journalist

== See also ==
- Glancy
