= Nickel glance =

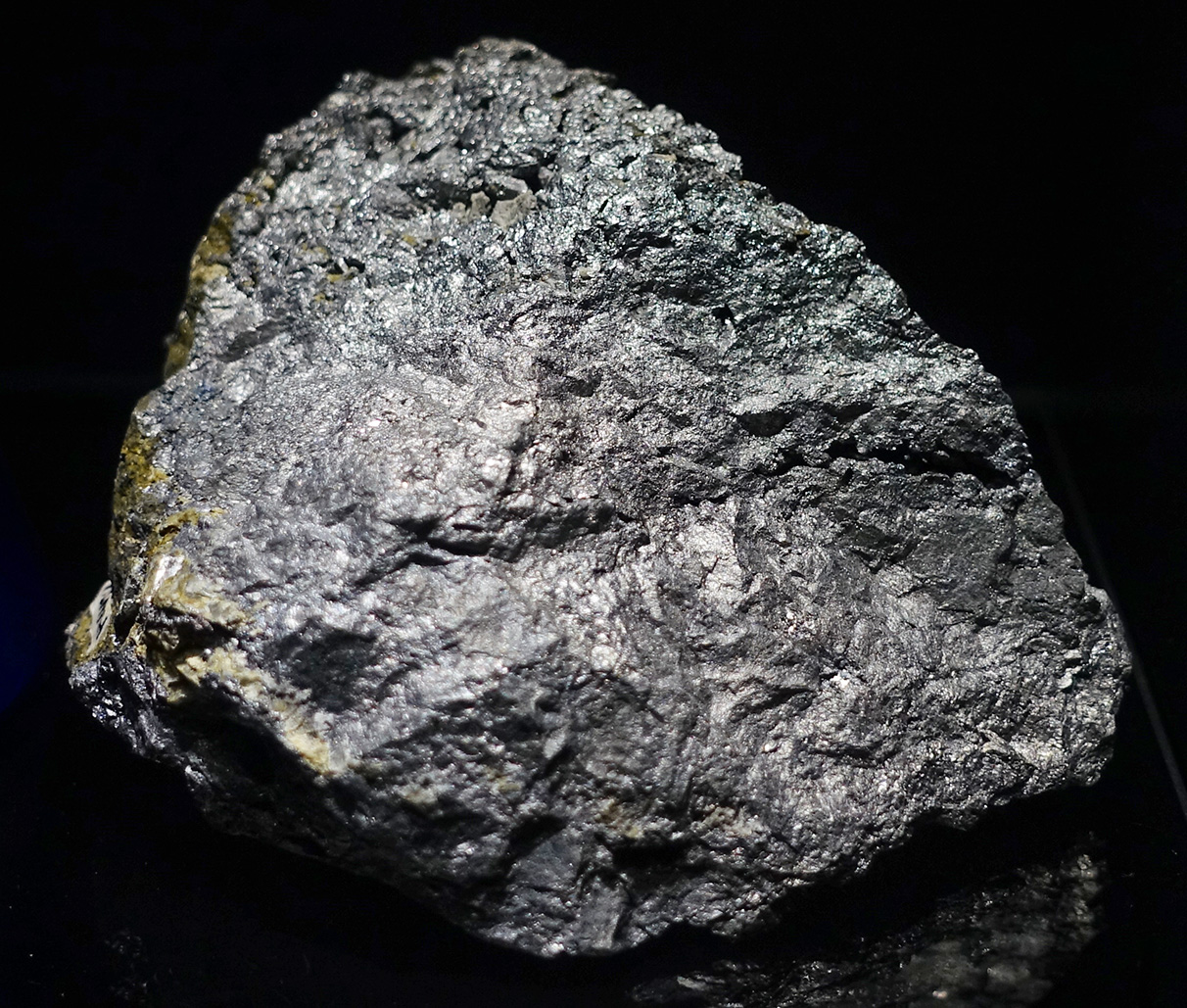
- Gersdorffite

General
- Category: Minerals

Nickel glance is a trivial name given by collectors and mineral traders, as well as miners, geologists and other professions to at least two ore nickel minerals. It may refer to:

- Arsenic-nickel glance — Gersdorffite (formula: NiAsS), nickel arsenic sulfide mineral
- Antimony-nickel glance — Ullmannite (formula: NiSbS), nickel antimony sulfide mineral (cobaltite group)
- Arsenic-antimony-nickel glance (or Antimony-arsenic-nickel glance) — mixed mineral, antimony gersdorffite (with an admixture of antimony);
- Nickel-bismuth glance — Polydymite (bismuth-nickel pyrite), mixed bimetallic mineral (whose main deposit is in Westphalia)

== Gallery ==
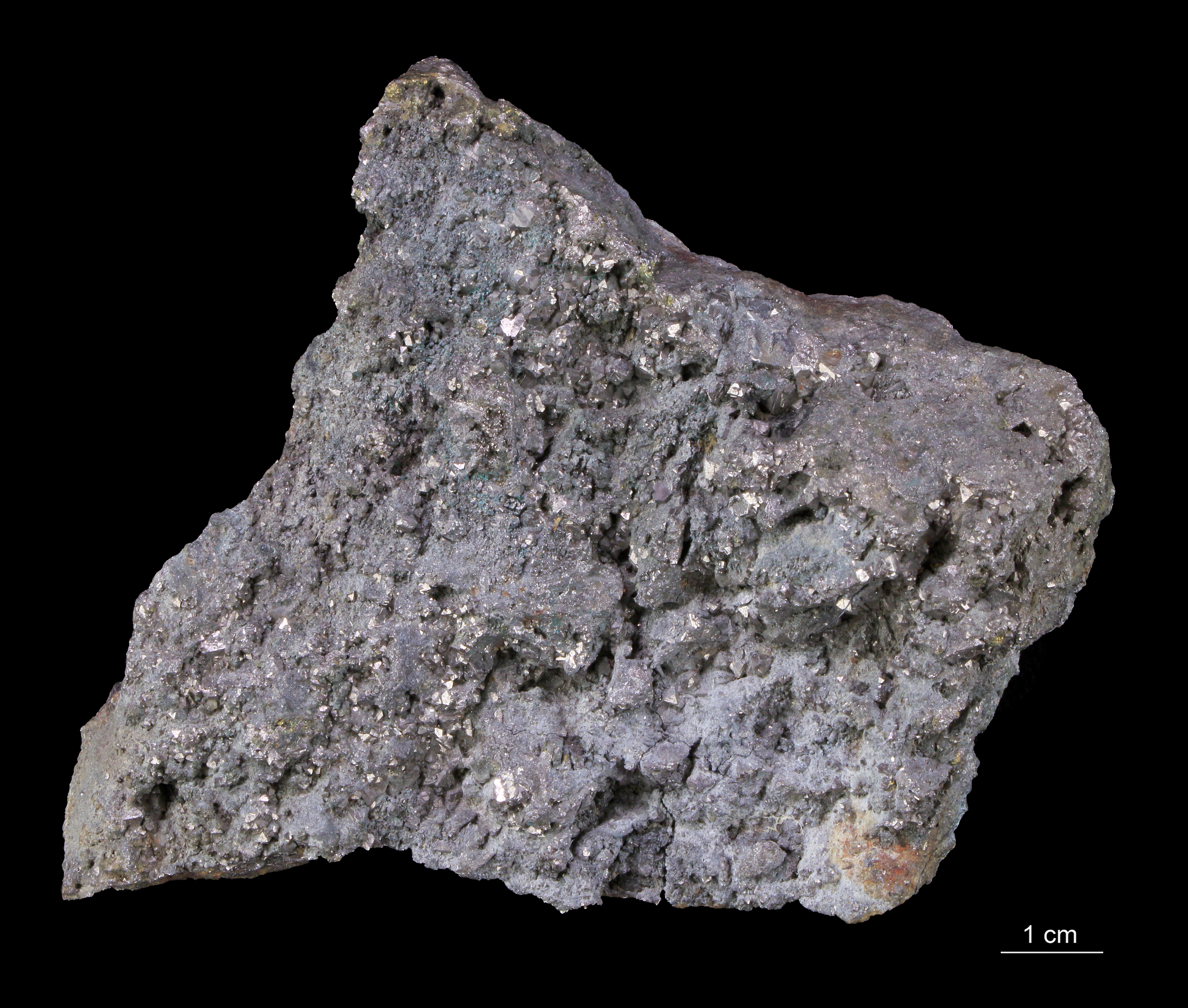
Gersdorffite

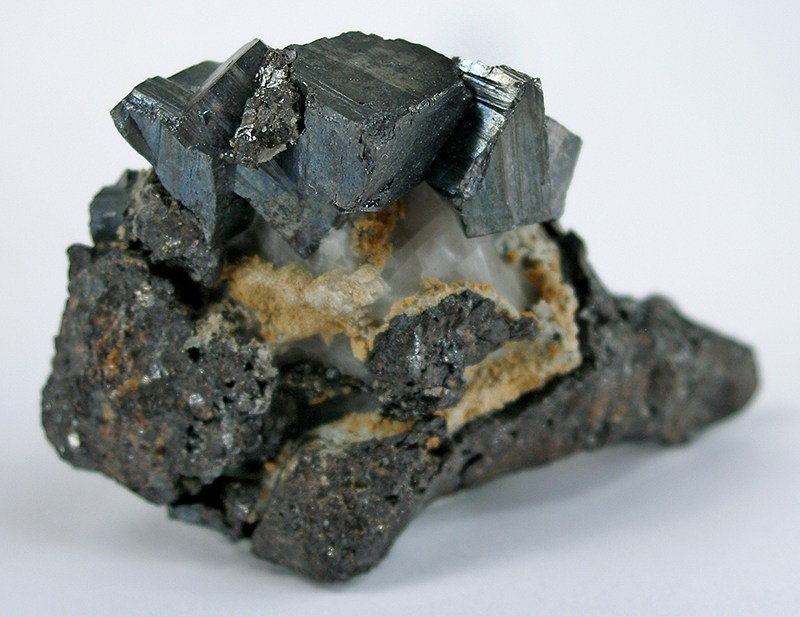
Ullmannite

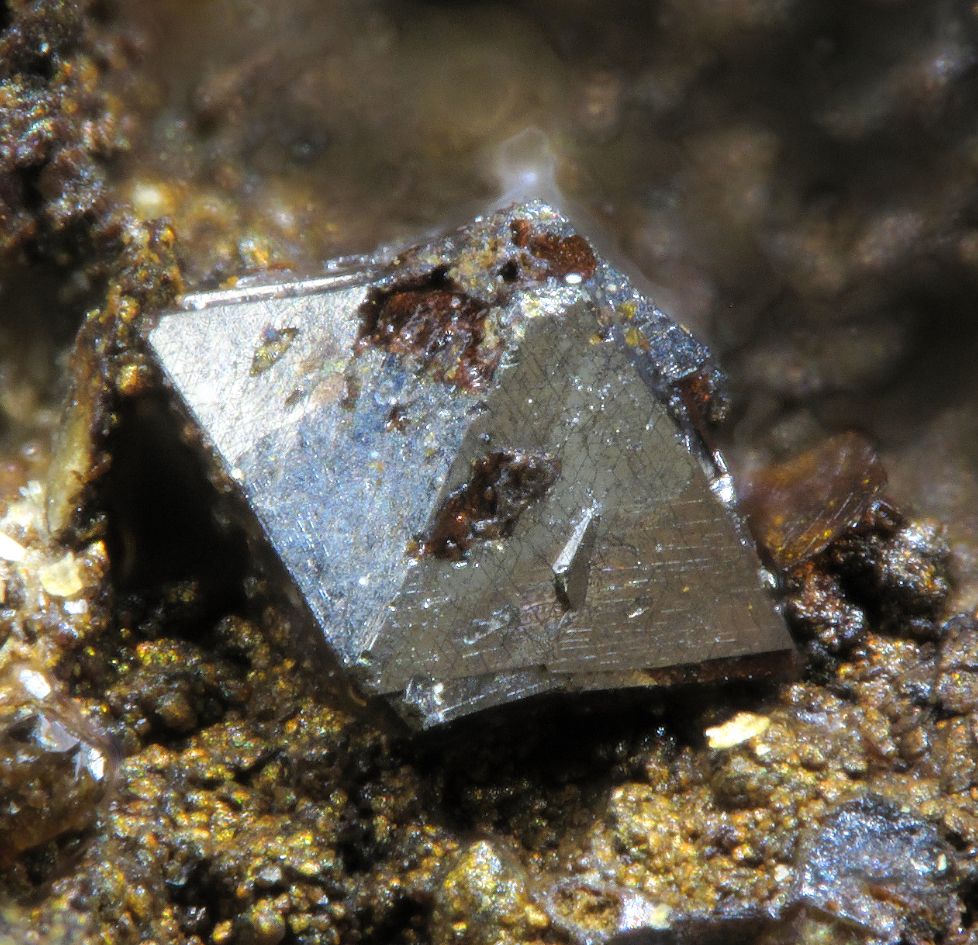
Polydymite

== See also ==
- Glance (disambiguation)
- Nickel (disambiguation)
