= Jacques Louis, Comte de Bournon =

French soldier and mineralogist

Jacques-Louis, Comte de Bournon
- Born: 21 January 1751; Metz, France
- Died: 24 August 1824 (aged 73); Versailles, France
- Citizenship: French
- Known for: work on meteorites, description of Bournonite
- Scientific career
- Fields: Mineralogy
- Institutions: United Kingdom, France

Jacques-Louis, Comte de Bournon FRS, FGS (21 January 1751 – 24 August 1825) was a French soldier and mineralogist who came to England after the French Revolution. He gained prominence in the scientific community, being elected a fellow of the Royal Society and was a founding member of the Geological Society before returning to France after the Bourbon Restoration.

== Early life ==
The eldest of four children, Jacques-Louis, Comte de Bournon was born in Metz on 21 January 1751. His father was Jacques de Bournon, the Seigneur of Retonfey and Gras and his mother was Marie-Anne Martinet of Nibouville. His interest in geology began with his father's cabinet of minerals and expanded as he travelled extensively in his youth. He began studying crystallography under Jean-Baptiste L. Romé de l'Isle in Paris.

== Military career ==
He became an officer in the Regiment de Toul; his military career prospered and he eventually reached the rank of lieutenant which found him serving as artillery captain during the French Revolution at the garrison of Grenoble in 1789.

== Work on meteorites ==
In 1801, whilst working with Edward Charles Howard, he was the first to describe the silicate minerals, sulphides, magnetic metal grains, globules and fine-grained matrices found in meteorites and was one of the first French scholars to become convinced of the extraterrestrial origins of meteorites at a time when most scientists accepted that they originated from the Moon. He was elected a Fellow of the Royal Society in 1802.

== Cataloguing mineral collections ==
Upon the recommendation of William Babington, Jacques-Louis was employed by Sir John St. Aubyn to curate and catalogue his mineral collection. This collection was moved to London to be stored alongside other collections by Sir Abraham Hume and Sir Charles Greville on which he was also working. He began to catalogue the collection based on crystal structure but was unable to finish due to the collection being moved back to Cornwall. Comte de Bournon’s catalogue was written in French and is currently held alongside Sir John St. Aubyn's collection at Plymouth City Museum and available online at Bibliothèque nationale de France.

== Geological Society ==
In 1807, he was one of the founding members of the Geological Society and he had a custom of writing his essays in French.

== Return to France ==
De Bournon remained loyal to Louis XVIII during his exile, going so far as to reject offers to return to France from Napoleon. When Louis XVIII returned to power in 1814, De Bournon accepted an offer from the King to buy his mineral collection for the state and was then appointed director-general of the Royal Mineral Cabinet. His collection was split into two and currently resides in Muséum national d'histoire naturelle and Collège de France.
