= Empressite =

Telluric silver mineral

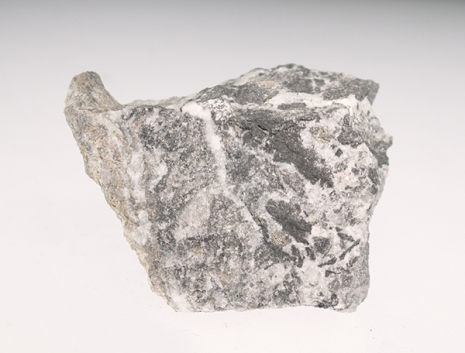
- Empressite from Joe mine, Tombstone district

General
- Category: Telluride mineral
- Formula: AgTe
- IMA symbol: Eps
- Strunz classification: 2.CB.80
- Crystal system: Orthorhombic
- Crystal class: Dipyramidal (mmm); H-M symbol: (2/m 2/m 2/m)
- Space group: Pmnb

Identification
- Color: Pale bronze
- Crystal habit: Granular masses
- Cleavage: None
- Fracture: Uneven to subconchoidal
- Tenacity: Brittle
- Mohs scale hardness: 3.5
- Luster: Metallic
- Streak: Gray-black to black
- Diaphaneity: Opaque
- Specific gravity: 7.6
- Optical properties: Opaque
- Pleochroism: Very strong, in gray to creamy white

Empressite or tellursilberblende is a mineral form of silver telluride, AgTe. It is a rare, grey, orthorhombic mineral with which can form compact masses, rarely as bipyramidal crystals.

Recent crystallographic analysis has confirmed that empressite is a distinct mineral with orthorhombic crystal structure, different from the hexagonal Ag_{5−x}Te_{3} with which empressite has been commonly confused in mineralogy literature. At the same time, empressite does not appear on the equilibrium Ag-Te phase diagram, and therefore it is only metastable at ambient conditions. Given infinite time, it would phase separate into pure Ag_{5}Te_{3} and pure Te.

The name empressite comes from the location of its discovery – the Empress Josephine mine, Saguache County, Colorado, US. It was first described in 1914.
