= Bournonite =

Sulfosalt mineral species

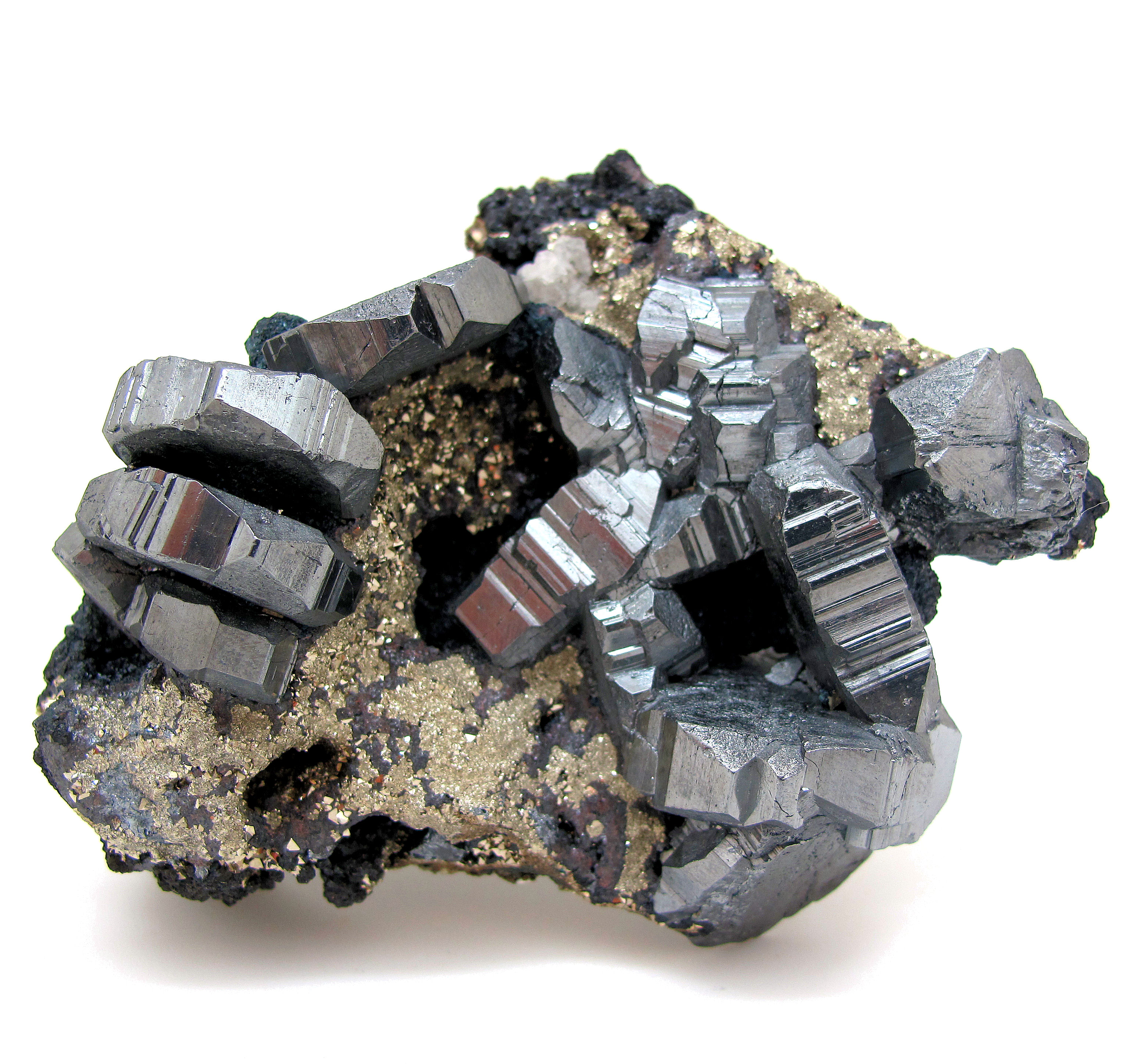
- Bournonite from Viboras mine, Machacamarcha, Bolivia, 95 mm x 74 mm, largest crystal size: 29 mm

General
- Category: Sulfosalt mineral
- Formula: PbCuSbS_{3}
- IMA symbol: Bnn
- Strunz classification: 2.GA.50
- Dana classification: 3.4.3.2
- Crystal system: Orthorhombic
- Crystal class: Pyramidal (mm2) (same H-M symbol)
- Space group: Pn2_{1}m

Identification
- Color: Steel-gray to iron-black
- Crystal habit: Crystals short prismatic to tabular, typically striated; commonly as subparallel aggregates. Also massive, granular to compact
- Twinning: On {110}, commonly forming cross or cogwheel aggregates
- Cleavage: [010] Imperfect
- Fracture: Subconchoidal to uneven
- Mohs scale hardness: 2.5 – 3.0
- Luster: Brilliant to dull
- Streak: Steel-gray to iron-black
- Diaphaneity: Opaque
- Specific gravity: 5.7 – 5.9
- Pleochroism: Very weak

Bournonite, also axotomous antimony glance, wheel ore, berthonite, volchite or dystomic glance (German: antimonbleikupferblende) is a sulfosalt mineral species, trithioantimoniate of lead and copper with the formula PbCuSbS_{3}.

It was first mentioned by Philip Rashleigh in 1797 as an ore of antimony and was more completely described in 1804 by French crystallographer and mineralogist Jacques Louis, Comte de Bournon (1751–1825), after whom it was named. The name given by Bournon himself (in 1813) was endellione, since used in the form endellionite, after St Endellion, the locality in Cornwall where the mineral was first found.

The crystals are orthorhombic, and are generally tabular in habit owing to the predominance of the basal pinacoid; numerous smooth bright faces are often developed on the edges and corners of the crystals. They are usually twinned, the twin-plane being a face of the prism (m); the angle between the faces of this prism being nearly a right angle (86° 20′), the twinning gives rise to cruciform groups and when it is often repeated the group has the appearance of a cog-wheel, hence the name Rãdelerz (wheel-ore) of the Kapnik miners. The repeated twinning gives rise to twin-lamellae, which may be detected on the fractured surfaces, even of the massive material.

It is a mineral in medium temperature hydrothermal vein deposits. It commonly occurs with galena, tetrahedrite, sphalerite, chalcopyrite, pyrite, stibnite, zinkenite, siderite, quartz, rhodochrosite, dolomite and barite.

It was first described for an occurrence in Wheal Boys in the parish of St Endellion in Cornwall, it was found associated with jamesonite, sphalerite and siderite. Later, still better crystals were found in another Cornish mine, namely, Herodsfoot mine near Liskeard, which was worked for argentiferous galena. Fine crystals of large size have been found with quartz and siderite in the mines at Neudorf in the Harz, and with sphalerite and tetrahedrite at Cavnic near Baia Mare in Romania. It has been reported from a large number of other localities.
