= Tom Glancy =

Scottish footballer

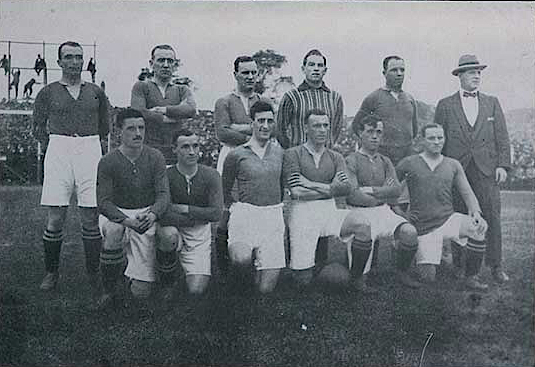
- Third Lanark team during 1923 tour – Glancy kneeling, second from right

Personal information
- Full name: Thomas Glancy
- Date of birth: 10 October 1894
- Place of birth: Cowdenbeath, Scotland
- Date of death: 11 February 1949 (aged 54)
- Place of death: Cowdenbeath, Scotland
- Positions: Wing half; inside forward

Senior career*
Years	Team	Apps	(Gls)
- Cowdenbeath St Leonard's
–1914	Inverkeithing United		
1914–1924	Falkirk	204	(36)
1924–1925	St Johnstone	30	(6)
1925–1934	Cowdenbeath	261	(14)
- * Club domestic league appearances and goals

Thomas Glancy (10 October 1894 – 11 February 1949) was a Scottish professional footballer who made nearly 500 appearances in the Scottish League for Cowdenbeath, Falkirk and St Johnstone. In 1923 he was a member of a squad organised by Third Lanark that toured South America.

== Personal life ==
Glancy was the cousin of footballer Lawrence Glancy and the father of junior footballer Watty Glancy.

== Career statistics ==
Appearances and goals by club, season and competition
Club	Season	League			National Cup		Total	
Club	Season	Division	Apps	Goals	Apps	Goals	Apps	Goals
Falkirk	1914–15	Scottish Division One	38	5	—		38	5
Falkirk	1918–19	Scottish Division One	10	1	—		10	1
Falkirk	1919–20	Scottish Division One	33	3	1	0	34	3
Falkirk	1920–21	Scottish Division One	30	10	4	1	34	11
Falkirk	1921–22	Scottish Division One	38	8	2	2	40	10
Falkirk	1922–23	Scottish Division One	29	7	3	1	32	8
Falkirk	1923–24	Scottish Division One	26	2	3	2	29	4
Falkirk	Total		204	36	13	6	217	42
St Johnstone	1924–25	Scottish Division One	30	6	1	0	31	6
Cowdenbeath	1925–26	Scottish Division One	26	3	1	0	27	3
Cowdenbeath	1926–27	Scottish Division One	26	3	2	0	28	3
Cowdenbeath	1927–28	Scottish Division One	28	1	2	0	30	1
Cowdenbeath	1928–29	Scottish Division One	20	2	3	0	23	2
Cowdenbeath	1929–30	Scottish Division One	30	1	2	0	32	1
Cowdenbeath	1930–31	Scottish Division One	35	2	1	0	36	2
Cowdenbeath	1931–32	Scottish Division One	33	0	2	0	35	0
Cowdenbeath	1932–33	Scottish Division One	34	2	2	0	36	2
Cowdenbeath	1933–34	Scottish Division One	29	0	2	0	31	0
Cowdenbeath	Total		261	14	17	0	278	14
Career total			495	56	31	6	526	62

== Honours ==
Falkirk

- Falkirk Infirmary Shield: 1914–15, 1919–20, 1920–21, 1921–22
- Stirlingshire Redding Pit Disaster Benefit Cup: 1923–24

Individual

- Cowdenbeath Hall of Fame
