= Acanthite =

Mineral, silver sulfide

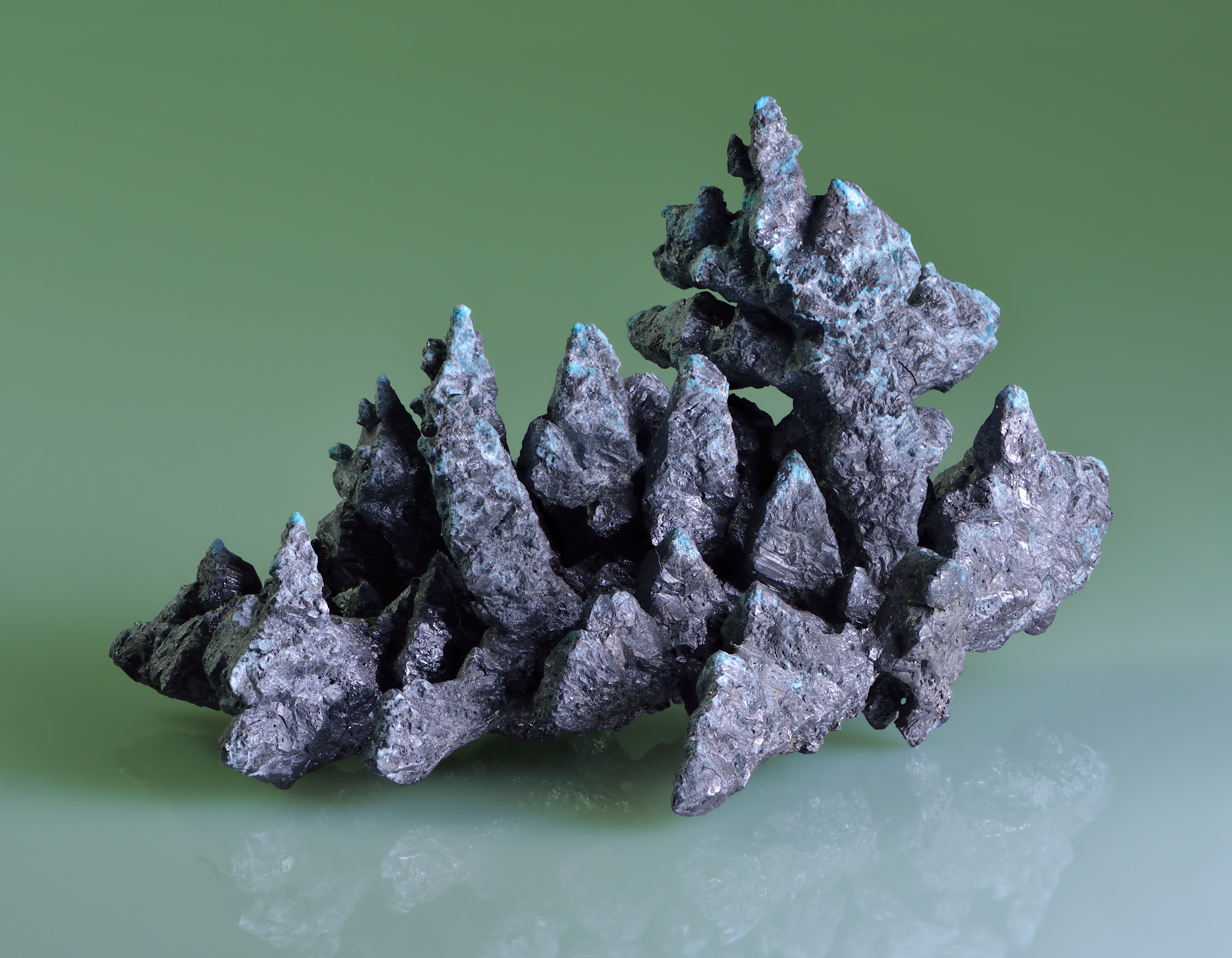
- Crystallized acanthite (4.0 × 2.5 × 1.5 cm) from Imiter mine, Jbel Saghro mountain range, Morocco

General
- Category: Sulfide mineral
- Formula: Ag_{2}S
- IMA symbol: Aca
- Strunz classification: 2.BA.30a
- Crystal system: Monoclinic
- Crystal class: Prismatic (2/m) (same H-M symbol)
- Space group: P2_{1}/n
- Unit cell: a = 4.229 Å, b = 6.931 Å c = 7.862 Å; β = 99.61°; Z = 4

Identification
- Color: Iron-black
- Crystal habit: Primary crystals rare, prismatic to long prismatic, elongated along [001], may be tubular; massive. Commonly paramorphic after the cubic high-temperature phase ("argentite"), of original cubic or octahedral habit
- Twinning: Polysynthetic on {111}, may be very complex due to inversion; contact on {101}
- Cleavage: Indistinct
- Fracture: Uneven
- Tenacity: Sectile
- Mohs scale hardness: 2.0–2.5
- Luster: Metallic
- Streak: Black
- Diaphaneity: Opaque
- Specific gravity: 7.20–7.22

Acanthite is a form of silver sulfide with the chemical formula Ag_{2}S. It crystallizes in the monoclinic system and is the stable form of silver sulfide below 173 °C (343 °F). Argentite is the stable form above that temperature. As argentite cools below that temperature its cubic form is distorted to the monoclinic form of acanthite. Below 173 °C acanthite forms directly. Acanthite is the only stable form in normal air temperature.

== Occurrence ==
Acanthite is a common silver mineral in moderately low-temperature hydrothermal veins and in zones of supergene enrichment. It occurs in association with native silver, pyrargyrite, proustite, polybasite, stephanite, aguilarite, galena, chalcopyrite, sphalerite, calcite and quartz.

Acanthite was first described in 1855 for an occurrence in the Jáchymov (Joachimsthal) district, Ore Mountains, Bohemia (today Karlovy Vary Region, Czech Republic). The name is from the Greek "akantha" meaning thorn or arrow, in reference to its crystal shape.

== Gallery ==
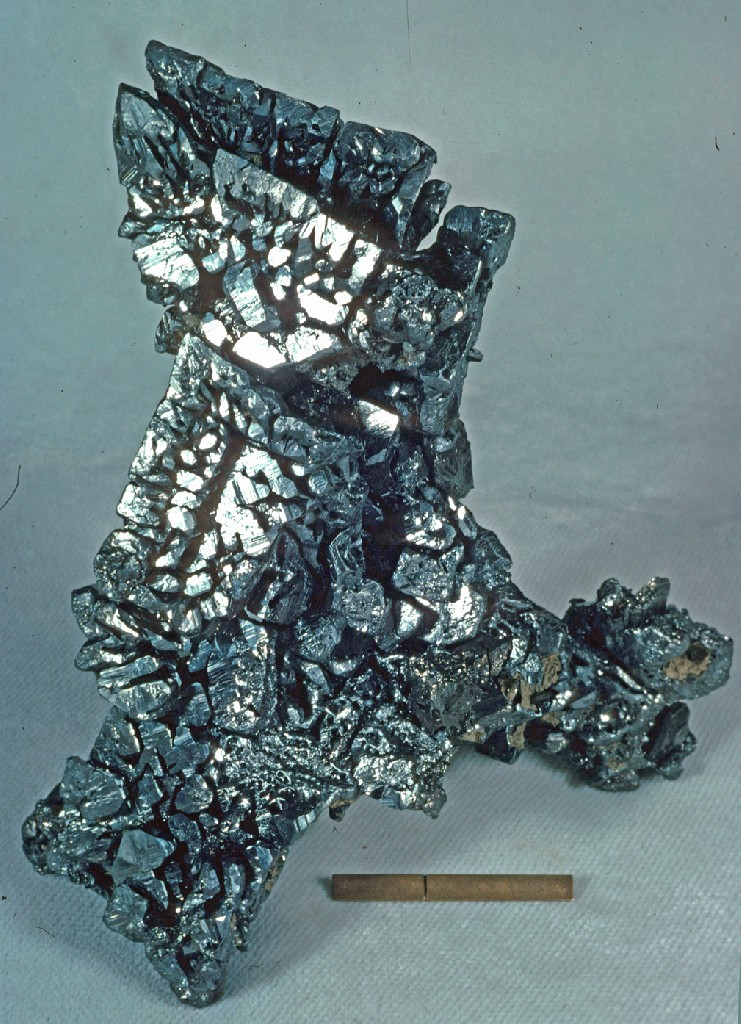
Acanthite. Locality: Chispas Mine, Arizpe, Sonora, Mexico. Scale is one inch with a ruled line at one cm.

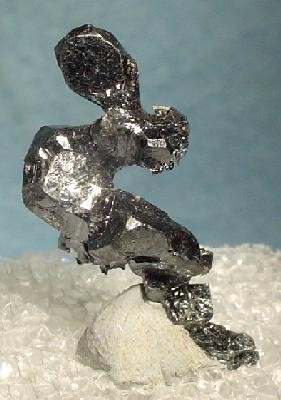
Classic acanthite specimen from the Rayas Mine at Guanajuato, Mexico. Size: 2.4 × 1.1 × 1.1 cm.

== See also ==
- List of minerals
