= Lawrence Glancy =

Scottish footballer

Personal information
- Date of birth: 29 July 1902
- Place of birth: Cowdenbeath, Scotland
- Position: Centre forward

Senior career*
Years	Team	Apps	(Gls)
–1922	Hearts of Beath		
1922–1923	Celtic	1	(0)
1922	→ Clackmannan (loan)		
1922	Cowdenbeath	6	(1)
1923–1924	Bo'ness	1	(1)
- * Club domestic league appearances and goals

Lawrence Glancy was a Scottish footballer who played in the Scottish League for Cowdenbeath, Celtic and Bo'ness as a centre forward.

== Personal life ==
Glancy was the cousin of footballer Tom Glancy and the uncle of junior footballer Watty Glancy.

== Career statistics ==
Appearances and goals by club, season and competition
Club	Season	League			National Cup		Total	
Club	Season	Division	Apps	Goals	Apps	Goals	Apps	Goals
Celtic	1921–22	Scottish Division One	1	0	0	0	1	0
Cowdenbeath	1922–23	Scottish Division Two	6	1	0	0	6	1
Bo'ness	1923–24	Scottish Division Two	1	1	0	0	1	1
Career total			8	2	0	0	8	2
