= Ullmannite =

Nickel antimony sulfide mineral

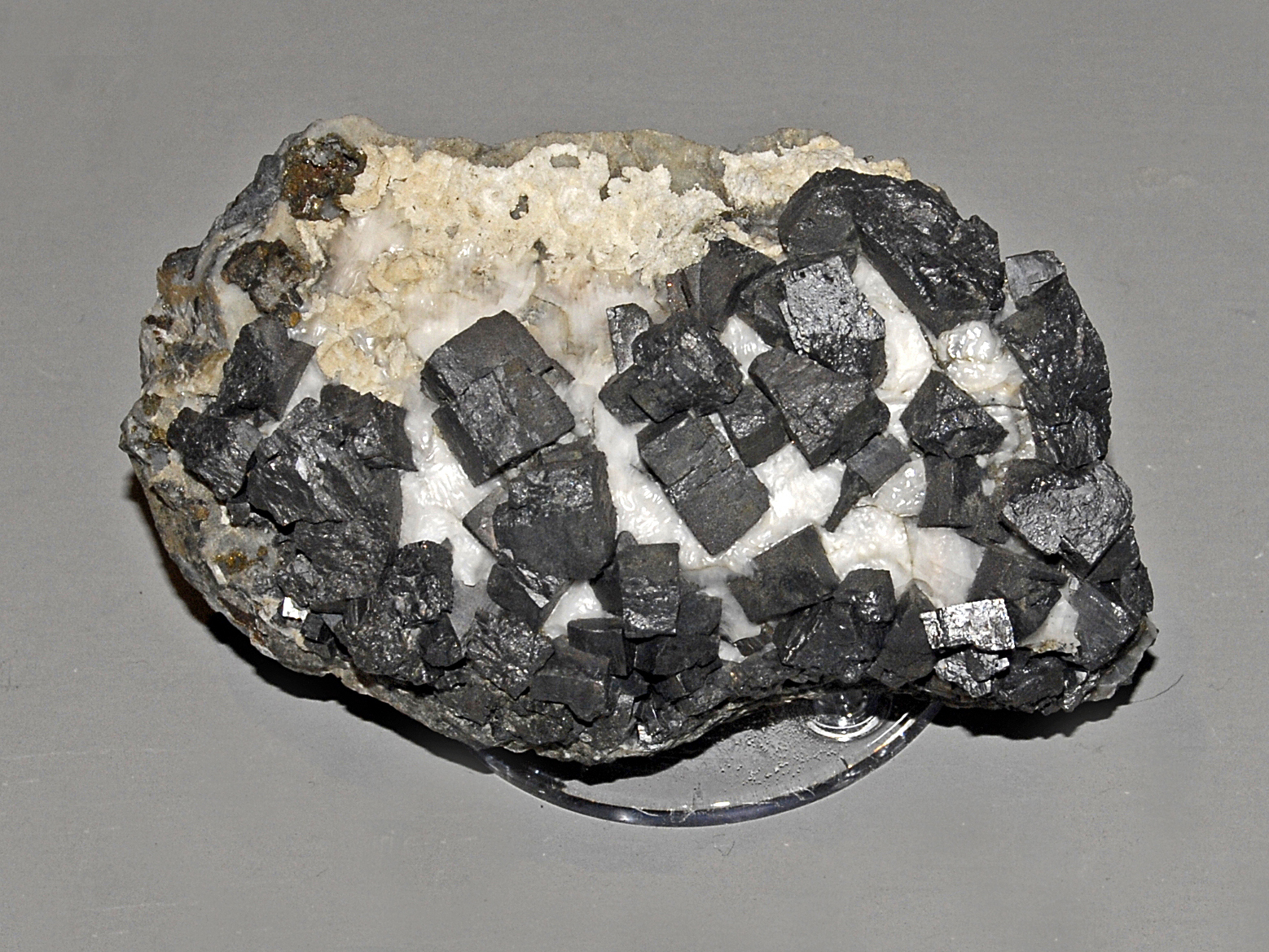

General
- Category: Sulfide mineral
- Formula: NiSbS
- IMA symbol: Ull
- Strunz classification: 2.EB.25
- Crystal system: Cubic
- Crystal class: Tetartoidal (23); H-M symbol: (23)
- Space group: P2_{1}3
- Unit cell: a = 5.91(2) Å; Z = 4

Identification
- Color: Steel-gray to tin white
- Twinning: Penetration twins about [110]
- Cleavage: Perfect on {001}
- Fracture: Uneven
- Tenacity: Brittle
- Mohs scale hardness: 5–5.5
- Luster: metallic
- Diaphaneity: Opaque
- Specific gravity: 6.65–6.85

Ullmannite or Nickel glance (trivial name) is a nickel antimony sulfide mineral with formula: NiSbS. Considerable substitution occurs with cobalt and iron in the nickel site along with bismuth and arsenic in the antimony site. A solid solution series exists with the high cobalt willyamite.

== Physical properties ==
Ullmannite is steel-gray to tin white in color with a metallic luster, has a Mohs hardness of 5 to 5.5 and a specific gravity of 6.65. Initially thought to be of two species, tetrahedral and cubic, it was later confirmed that both samples conformed to the 23 point group of the isometric crystal class and typically exhibits cubic, octahedral, or pyritohedral forms although euhedral crystals are rare.

Variance in its chemical composition has been shown to be responsible for loss of symmetry and variations in striation patterns.

Ullmannite crystals are usually less than 2 mm, however larger have been identified in especially antimony rich environments. Ullmannite commonly displays interpenetration twins as well as enantiomorphic twinning along [110].

== Occurrence ==
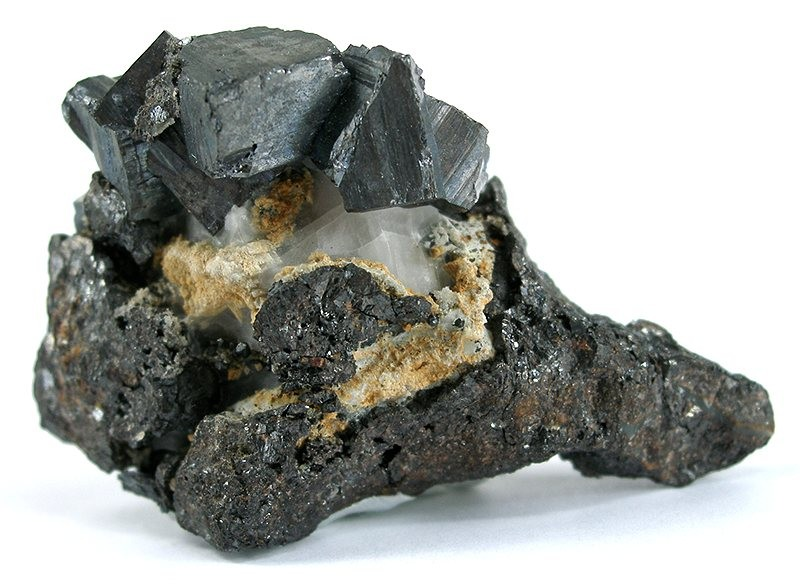
Ullmannite crystals from the Masaloni Mine, San Vito, Cagliari Province, Sardinia, Italy (size: 5.4 × 3.3 × 2.1 cm)

It is a member of the cobaltite group and forms a series with willyamite ((Co,Ni)SbS). It occurs with nickeline, gersdorffite, pentlandite, chalcopyrite, pyrrhotite, galena, tetrahedrite and dyscrasite in hydrothermal deposits.

Principal localities are in Germany, it is also found in Austria, Australia, France, England, and Wales.

It was first described in 1843 for an occurrence in the Storch und Schöneberg Mine, North Rhine-Westphalia, Germany.

Specimens of ullmannite were found at Sarrabus, Sardinia, Italy in 1887. The crystals of the specimens from Sarrabus were described as hemihedral with parallel faces, whereas specimens from Lölling in present-day Austria were hemihedral with inclined faces.

== Origin of name ==
Ullmannite was named for German chemist and mineralogist, Johann Christoph Ullmann (1771–1821), one of the fathers of systematic mineralogy. Ullmann established a mineral collection (now the basis for the internationally renowned Museum of Mineralogy in Marburg) and authored Ein Systematisch-Tabellarische Übersicht der Mineralogisch einfachen Fossilien, one of the first attempts to provide a structured organization to the observed minerals of the day.

== See also ==
- List of minerals
- List of minerals named after people
