= Telluro-silver glance =

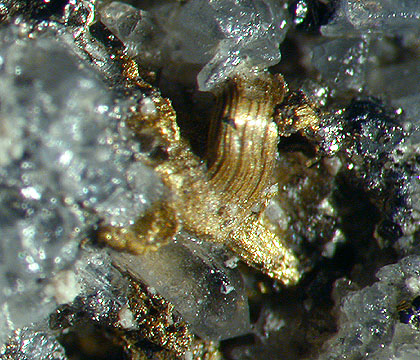
- Gold and telluro-silver glance (Colorado, USA)

General
- Category: Minerals

Telluro-silver glance (German: telluriumsilberglanz, tellursilberglanz) is a trivial name given by collectors and mineral dealers, miners, geologists and other professions to at least two rare ore minerals, tellurides of silver. It may refer to:

- Telluric silver glance — hessite, a rare ore mineral, telluric silver. Discovered in 1829, in the mines of Western Altai.
- Telluride silver glance (also written or graphic glance) — is sylvanite, a rare ore mineral mixed with gold and silver telluride, first discovered in Transylvania.
- Telluric silver glance (or Telluric Gold-Silverglance) — petzite, a rare ore mineral close to hessite; silver and gold telluride.

== Gallery ==
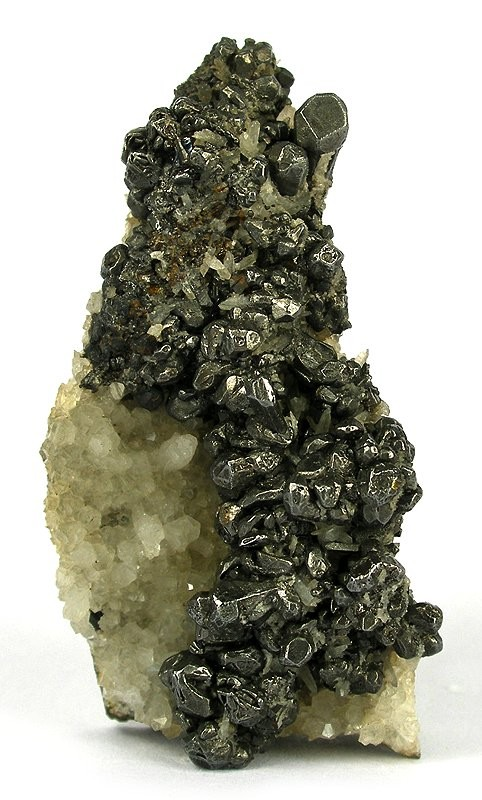
Hessite

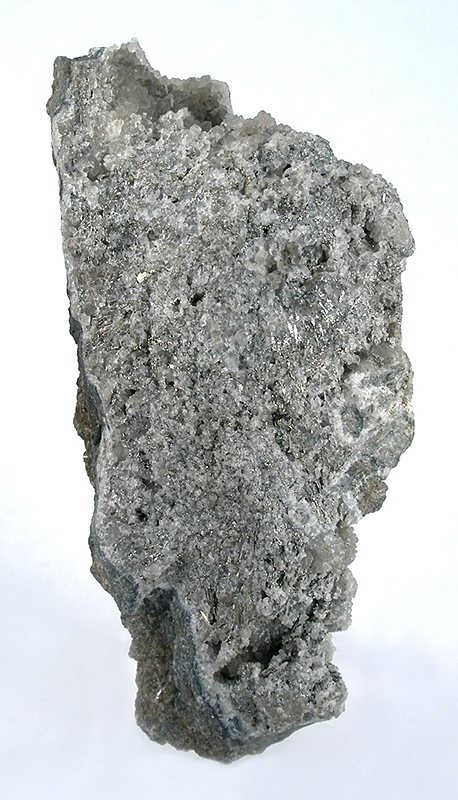
Sylvanite

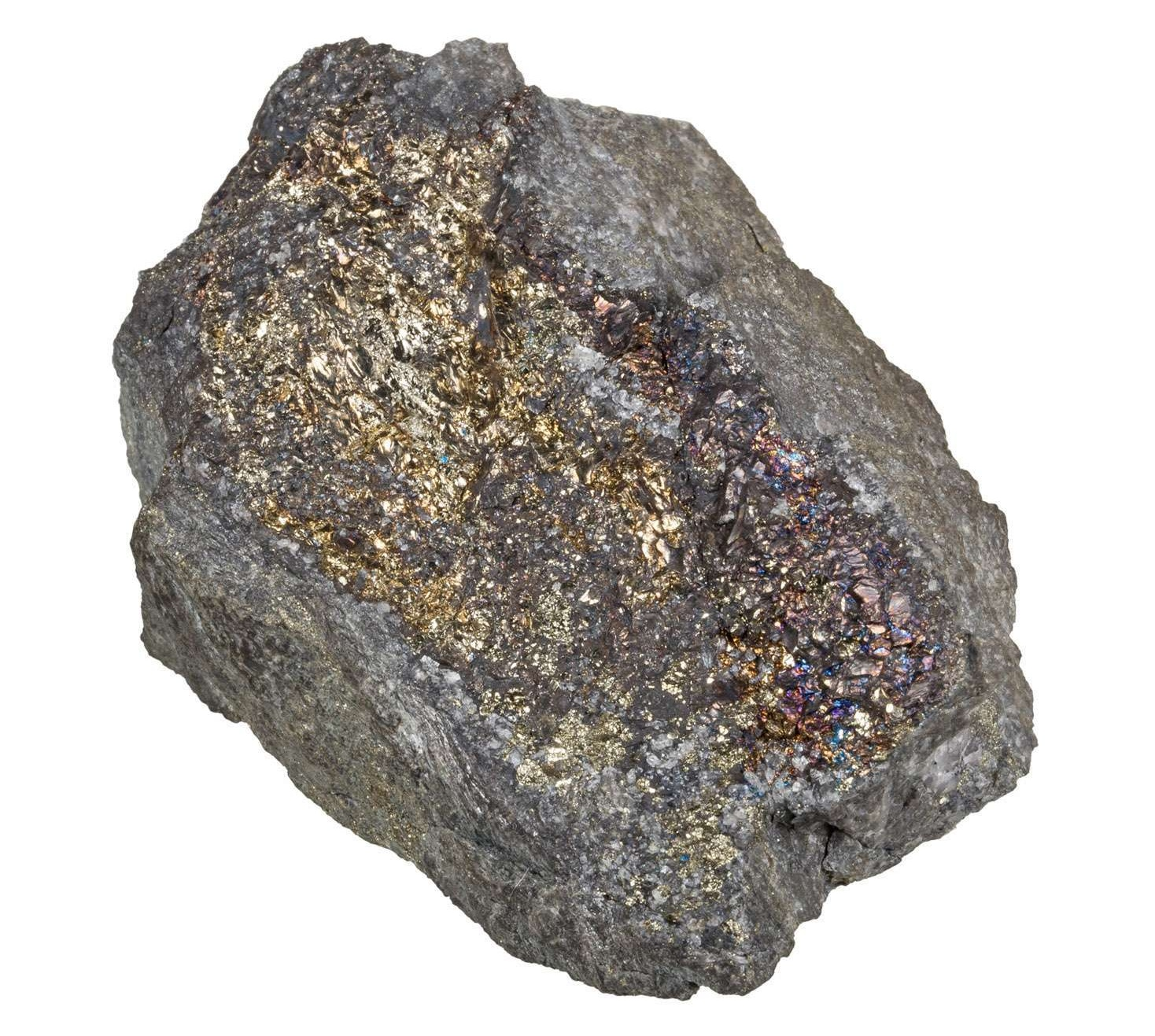
Petzite

== See also ==
- Glance (disambiguation)
- Tellurium
- Silver (disambiguation)
- Gold (disambiguation)
- Glances
