= Stephanite =

Sulfosalt mineral

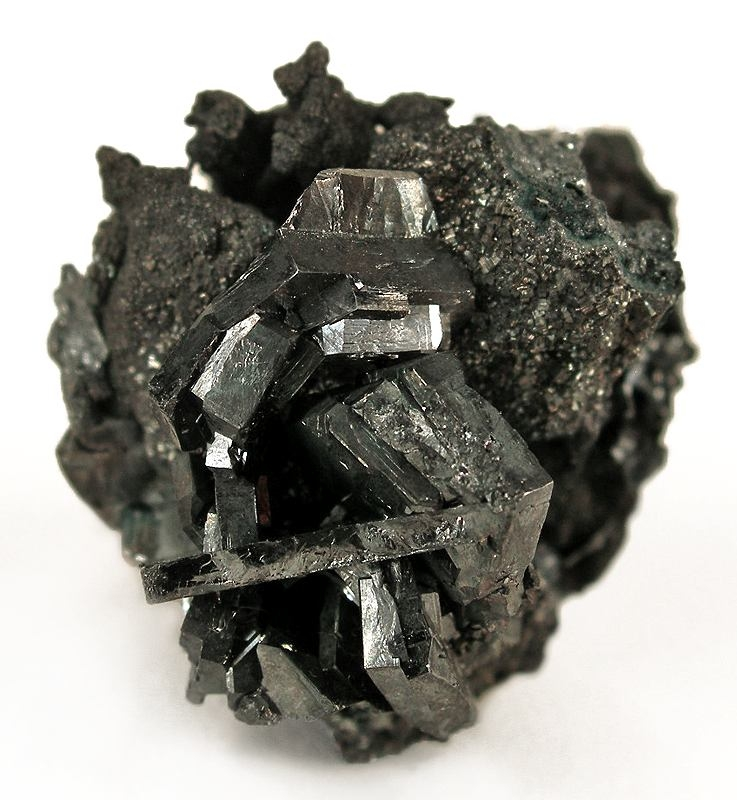

General
- Category: Sulfosalt mineral
- Formula: Ag_{5}SbS_{4}
- IMA symbol: Sph
- Strunz classification: 2.GB.10
- Dana classification: 03.02.04.01
- Crystal system: Orthorhombic
- Crystal class: Pyramidal (mm2); H-M symbol: (mm2)
- Space group: Cmc2_{1}

Identification
- Colour: Lead grey to black
- Crystal habit: Tabular, pseudo-hexagonal crystals; massive
- Twinning: Common on [110] repeated, forms pseudohexagonal groupings
- Cleavage: Imperfect on {010}, poor on {021}
- Fracture: Subconchoidal
- Tenacity: Brittle
- Mohs scale hardness: 2.0–2.5
- Lustre: Metallic
- Streak: Iron black
- Diaphaneity: Opaque
- Specific gravity: 6.26
- Optical properties: Anisotropic in polished section
- Pleochroism: Very weak – white to pale pink

Stephanite is a silver antimony sulfosalt mineral with formula: Ag_{5}SbS_{4}. It is composed of 68.8% silver, and sometimes is of importance as an ore of this metal.

== History ==
Under the name Schwarzerz it was mentioned by Georgius Agricola in 1546, and it has been variously known as "black silver ore" (German Schwarzgultigerz), brittle silver-ore (Sprödglanzerz), etc. The name stephanite was proposed by W Haidinger in 1845 in honour of the Archduke of Austria Stephan Franz Victor of Habsburg-Lorena (1817–1867). French authors use F. S. Beudant's name psaturose (from the Greek ψαθυρός, fragile).

== Properties ==
It frequently occurs as well-formed crystals, which are orthorhombic and occasionally show indications of hemimorphism: they have the form of six-sided prisms or flat tables terminated by large basal planes and often modified at the edges by numerous pyramid-planes. Twinning on the prism-planes is of frequent occurrence, giving rise to pseudo-hexagonal groups like those of aragonite. The colour is iron-black, and the lustre metallic and brilliant; on exposure to light, however, the crystals soon become dull. Stephanite is an important ore of silver in some mining camps.

== Occurrence ==
Stephanite occurs as a late-stage mineral with other ores of silver in hydrothermal veins. Associated minerals include proustite, acanthite, native silver, tetrahedrite, galena, sphalerite and pyrite. Localities which have yielded good crystallized specimens are Freiberg and Gersdorf near Rosswein in Saxony, Chañarcillo in Chile, and exceptionally Cornwall. In the Comstock lode in Nevada massive stephanite and argentite are important ores of silver.

== See also ==
- List of minerals
- List of minerals named after people
