= Glance =

Glance may refer to:

- Eye contact, a behavioral event related to vision
- USS Glance (1863), a Union Navy steamship during the American Civil War
- Glance, glances, a group of minerals widely known until the mid-20th century, including:
  - Antimony glance (Stibnite)
  - Bismuth glance (Bismutite)
  - Cobalt glance (Cobaltite)
  - Copper glance (Chalcocite)
  - Iron glance (Hematite)
  - Lead glance (Galena)
  - Molybdenum glance (Molybdenite)
  - Silver glance (Argentite)
- Glance (album), an album by Rose Kemp
- Glance, OpenStack's image service
- Glance (company), Indian software and content company

== People with the surname ==
- Harvey Glance (1957–2023), American track athlete
- Stephanie Glance, American basketball coach

== See also ==
- Glancy
