= Sectility =

Behavior of a material when cut

Sectility is the ability of a material to be cut into thin pieces with a sharp edge. Most materials that are not sectile will be broken into rougher pieces when cut. Most metals and paper are sectile.

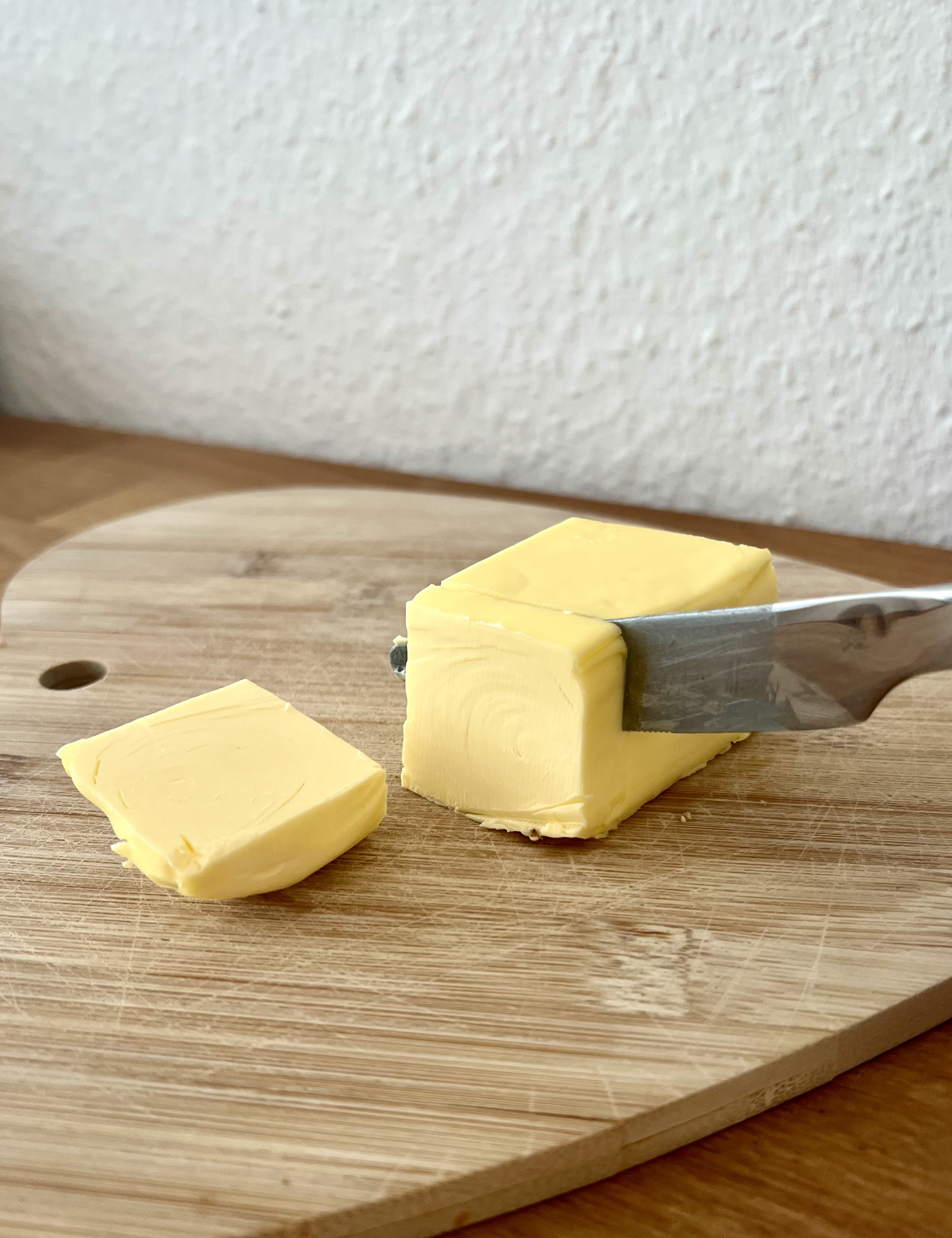
Butter is a sectile material.

Sectility can be used to distinguish minerals of similar appearance, and is a form of tenacity. For example, gold is sectile but pyrite ("fool's gold") is not.

Sectility is often a strong indicator of a material's spreadability. For this reason, sectility is often measured in food science to help assess the texture of semi-solid foods such as butter or tofu.

Sectility in metals is a result of metallic bonding, where valence (bonding) electrons are delocalized and can flow freely between atoms, rather than being shared between specific pairs or groups of atoms, as in covalent bonding.
