= Hessite =

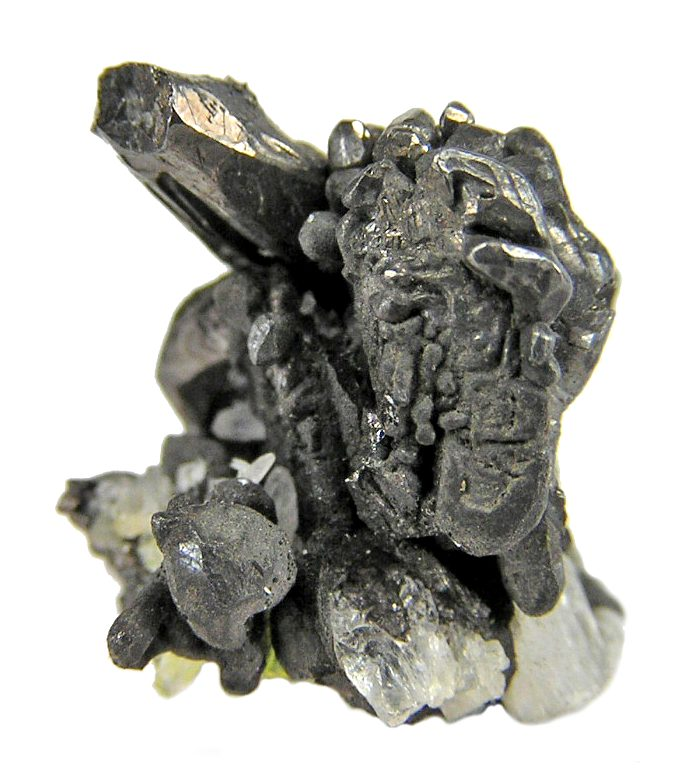

General
- Category: Sulfide minerals
- Formula: Ag_{2}Te
- IMA symbol: Hes
- Strunz classification: 2.BA.30c
- Crystal system: Monoclinic
- Crystal class: Prismatic (2/m) (same H-M symbol)
- Space group: P2_{1}/c
- Unit cell: a = 8.13, b = 4.48 c = 8.09 [Å]; β = 112.9°; Z = 4

Identification
- Color: Lead-grey, steel-grey
- Cleavage: Indistinct on {100}
- Tenacity: Sectile
- Mohs scale hardness: 2–3
- Luster: Metallic
- Streak: Black
- Diaphaneity: Opaque
- Specific gravity: 8.24 – 8.45
- Optical properties: Anisotropic

Hessite is a mineral form of disilver telluride (Ag_{2}Te). It is a soft, dark grey telluride mineral which forms monoclinic crystals.

It is named after Germain Henri Hess (1802–1850).

Hessite is found in the US in Eagle County, Colorado and in Calaveras County, California and in many other locations.

Stützite (Ag_{7}Te_{4}) and empressite (AgTe) are related silver telluride minerals.
