= Jamesonite =

Sulfosalt mineral

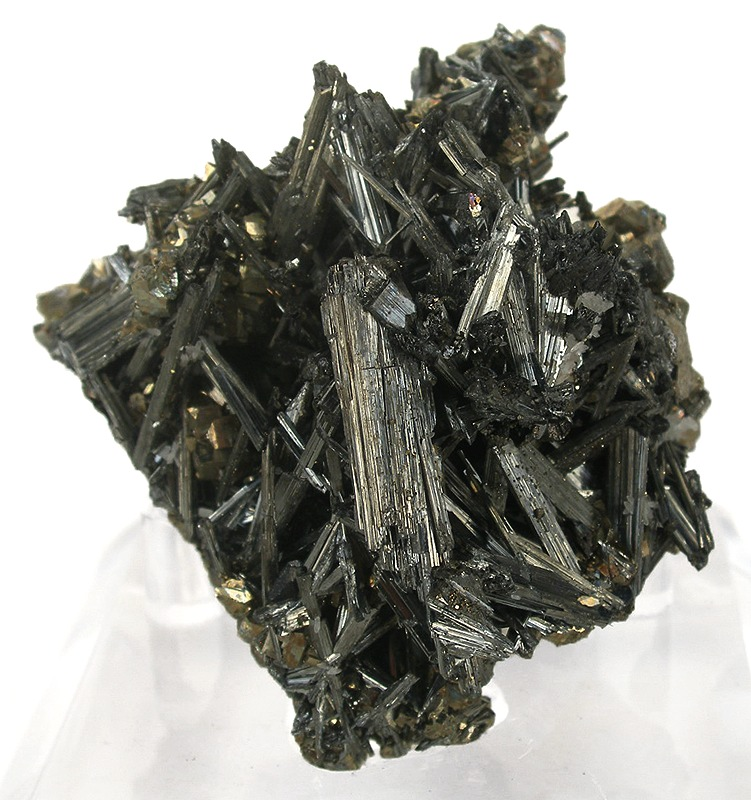
- Jamesonite crystals

General
- Category: Sulfosalt
- Formula: Pb_{4}FeSb_{6}S_{14}
- IMA symbol: Ja
- Strunz classification: 2.HB.15
- Crystal system: Monoclinic
- Crystal class: Prismatic (2/m) (same H-M symbol)
- Space group: P2_{1}/a

Identification
- Color: grey-black
- Cleavage: {001} good; also possibly {010} and {120}
- Mohs scale hardness: 2 1/2
- Luster: metallic
- Streak: grey-black
- Diaphaneity: opaque
- Specific gravity: 5.63

Jamesonite (also axotomous antimony glance, domingite, comuccite, pfaffite, grey antimony or feather ore) is a sulphosalt mineral, a lead, iron, antimony sulphide with formula Pb_{4}FeSb_{6}S_{14}. With the addition of manganese it forms a series with benavidesite. It is a dark grey metallic mineral which forms acicular prismatic monoclinic crystals. It is soft with a Mohs hardness of 2.5 and has a specific gravity of 5.5 – 5.6. It is one of the few sulphide minerals to form fibrous or needle like crystals. It can also form large prismatic crystals similar to stibnite with which it can be associated. It is usually found in low to moderate temperature hydrothermal deposits.

It was named for Scottish mineralogist Robert Jameson (1774–1854). It was first identified in 1825 in Cornwall, England. It is also reported from South Dakota and Arkansas, US; Zacatecas, Mexico; and Romania.

Jamesonite generally has a very large number of synonyms, as well as regional and trivial names, which is unusual even for such noticeable minerals from a practical point of view. First of all, this is the already mentioned above domingite, comuccite, pfaffite, gray antimony or feather ore. In addition, jamesonite is also known by its English names: warrenite, wolfsbergite, plumite, rosellan, rosenite, sakharovaite, bleiantimonit, antimonial radiant glance, falkmanite... In the old German mineralogical literature the following names for jamesonite were also found: lumpenerz, stahlantimonglanz, spiessglasfedererz, chalybinglanz, zundererz. Moreover, the term “axotomous antimony glance” until the beginning of the 19th century was considered scientific in the mineralogical environment and was predominant.
