= Silver sulfide =

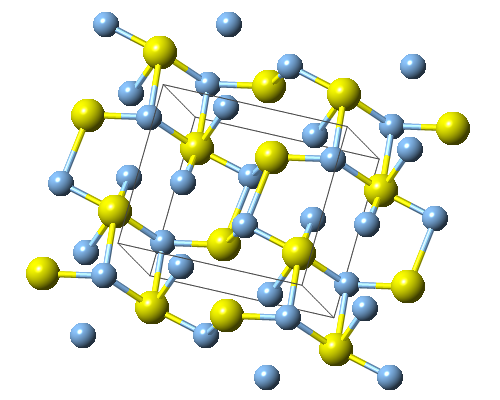
- Ball-and-stick model of silver sulfide

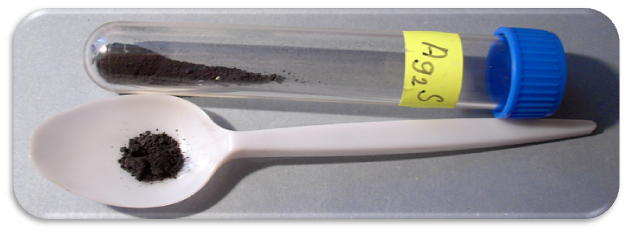
- Sample of silver sulfide

Names
- IUPAC name Silver(I) sulfide
- Other names Silver sulfide Argentous sulfide

Identifiers
CAS Number	21548-73-2
3D model (JSmol)	Interactive image
ChemSpider	145878
ECHA InfoCard	100.040.384
EC Number	244-438-2
PubChem CID	166738
UNII	9ZB10YHC1C
CompTox Dashboard (EPA)	DTXSID60925902 DTXSID80893679, DTXSID60925902
- InChI: InChI=1S/2Ag.S/q2*+1;-2 Key: XUARKZBEFFVFRG-UHFFFAOYSA-N
- SMILES: S(Ag)Ag

Properties
Chemical formula	Ag_{2}S
Molar mass	247.80 g·mol^{−1}
Appearance	Grayish-blackish crystal
Odor	Odorless
Density	7.234 g/cm^{3} (25 °C); 7.12 g/cm^{3} (117 °C)
Melting point	836 °C (1,537 °F; 1,109 K)
Solubility in water	6.21·10^{−15} g/L (25 °C)
Solubility product (K_{sp})	6.31·10^{−50}
Solubility	Soluble in aq. HCN, aq. citric acid with KNO_{3} Insoluble in acids, alkalies, aqueous ammoniums

Structure
Crystal structure	Monoclinic, mP12 (α-form); Cubic, cI8 (β-form); Cubic, cF12 (γ-form)
Space group	Im3̅m, No. 229 (α-form); P2_{1}/n, No. 14 (β-form); Fm3̅m, No. 225 (γ-form)
Point group	2/m (α-form); 4/m 3̅ 2/m (β-form, γ-form)
Lattice constant	a = 4.23 Å, b = 6.91 Å, c = 7.87 Å (α-form) α = 90°, β = 99.583°, γ = 90°

Thermochemistry
Heat capacity (C)	76.57 J/mol·K
Std molar entropy (S^{⦵}_{298})	143.93 J/mol·K
Std enthalpy of formation (Δ_{f}H^{⦵}_{298})	−32.59 kJ/mol
Gibbs free energy (Δ_{f}G^{⦵})	−40.71 kJ/mol

Hazards
- Occupational safety and health (OHS/OSH)
Main hazards	May cause irritation
- GHS labelling
Pictograms	(GHS07: Exclamation mark)
Signal word	Warning
Hazard statements	H315, H319, H335
Precautionary statements	P261, P305+P351+P338
NFPA 704 (fire diamond)	0 0 0
- Except where otherwise noted, data are given for materials in their standard state (at 25 °C [77 °F], 100 kPa). verify (what is ?) Infobox references

Silver sulfide is an inorganic compound with the formula Ag_{2}S. A dense black solid, it is the only sulfide of silver. It is useful as a photosensitizer in photography. It constitutes the tarnish that forms over time on silverware and other silver objects. Silver sulfide is insoluble in most solvents, but is degraded by strong acids. Silver sulfide is a network solid made up of silver (electronegativity of 1.98) and sulfur (electronegativity of 2.58) where the bonds have low ionic character (approximately 10%).

== Formation ==
Silver sulfide naturally occurs as the tarnish on silverware. When combined with silver, hydrogen sulfide gas creates a layer of black silver sulfide patina on the silver, protecting the inner silver from further conversion to silver sulfide. Silver whiskers can form when silver sulfide forms on the surface of silver electrical contacts operating in an atmosphere rich in hydrogen sulfide and high humidity. Such atmospheres can exist in sewage treatment and paper mills.

== Structure and properties ==
Three forms are known: monoclinic acanthite (α-form), stable below 179 °C, body centered cubic so-called argentite (β-form), stable above 180 °C, and a high temperature face-centred cubic (γ-form) stable above 586 °C. The higher temperature forms are electrical conductors. It is found in nature as relatively low temperature mineral acanthite. Acanthite is an important ore of silver. The acanthite, monoclinic, form features two kinds of silver centers, one with two and the other with three near neighbour sulfur atoms. Argentite refers to a cubic form, which, due to instability in "normal" temperatures, is found in form of the pseudomorphosis of acanthite after argentite.

=== Ductility of α-Ag_{2}S ===
Relative to most inorganic materials, α-Ag_{2}S displays exceptional ductility at room temperature. This material can undergo extensive deformation, akin to metals, without fracturing. Such behavior is evident in various mechanical tests; for instance, α-Ag2S can be easily machined into cylindrical or bar shapes and can withstand substantial deformation under compression, three-point bending, and tensile stresses. The material sustains over 50% engineering strain in compression tests and up to 20% or more in bending tests.

The intrinsic ductility of alpha-phase silver sulfide (α-Ag_{2}S) is underpinned by its unique structural and chemical bonding characteristics. At the atomic level, its monoclinic crystal structure, which remains stable up to 451 K, enables the movement of atoms and dislocations along well-defined crystallographic planes known as slip planes. Additionally, the dynamic bonding within the crystal structure supports both the sliding of atomic layers and the maintenance of material integrity during deformation. The interatomic forces within the slip planes are sufficiently strong to prevent the material from cleaving while still allowing for considerable flexibility. Further insights into α-Ag_{2}S's ductility come from density functional theory calculations, which reveal that the primary slip planes align with the [100] direction and slipping occurs along the [001] direction. This arrangement permits atoms to glide over each other under stress through minute adjustments in the interlayer distances, which are energetically favorable as indicated by low slipping energy barriers (ΔE_{B}) and high cleavage energies (ΔE_{C}). These properties ensure significant deformation capability without fracture. Silver and sulfur atoms in α-Ag_{2}S form transient, yet robust interactions that enable the material to retain its integrity while deforming. This behavior is akin to that of metals, where dislocations move with relative ease, providing α-Ag_{2}S with a unique combination of flexibility and strength, making it exceptionally resistant to cracking under mechanical stress.

== History ==
In 1833 Michael Faraday noticed that the resistance of silver sulfide decreased dramatically as temperature increased. This constituted the first report of a semiconducting material.

Silver sulfide is a component of classical qualitative inorganic analysis.
