= Polybasite =

Mineral

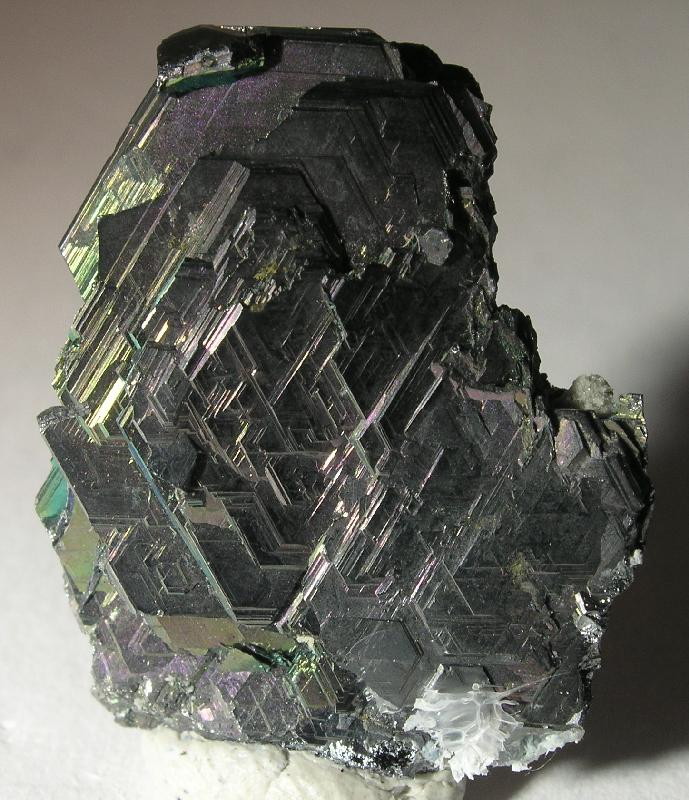

General
- Category: Sulfosalt minerals
- Formula: [(Ag,Cu)_{6}(Sb,As)_{2}S_{7}][Ag_{9}CuS_{4}]
- IMA symbol: Plb
- Strunz classification: 2.GB.15
- Crystal system: Monoclinic and trigonal polytypes
- Crystal class: Prismatic (2/m) (same H-M symbol)
- Space group: C2/c

Identification
- Colour: steel black
- Cleavage: poor on (001)
- Fracture: uneven
- Mohs scale hardness: 1.5–2
- Lustre: metallic, adamantine or glimmering
- Streak: black with reddish tint
- Specific gravity: 6–6.2

Polybasite is a sulfosalt mineral of silver, copper, antimony and arsenic. Its chemical formula is [(Ag,Cu)_{6}(Sb,As)_{2}S_{7}][Ag_{9}CuS_{4}].

It forms black monoclinic crystals (thin, tabular, with six corners) which can show dark red internal reflections. It has a Mohs hardness of 2.5 to 3. It is found worldwide and is an ore of silver. The name comes from the number of base metals in the mineral.

== Images ==
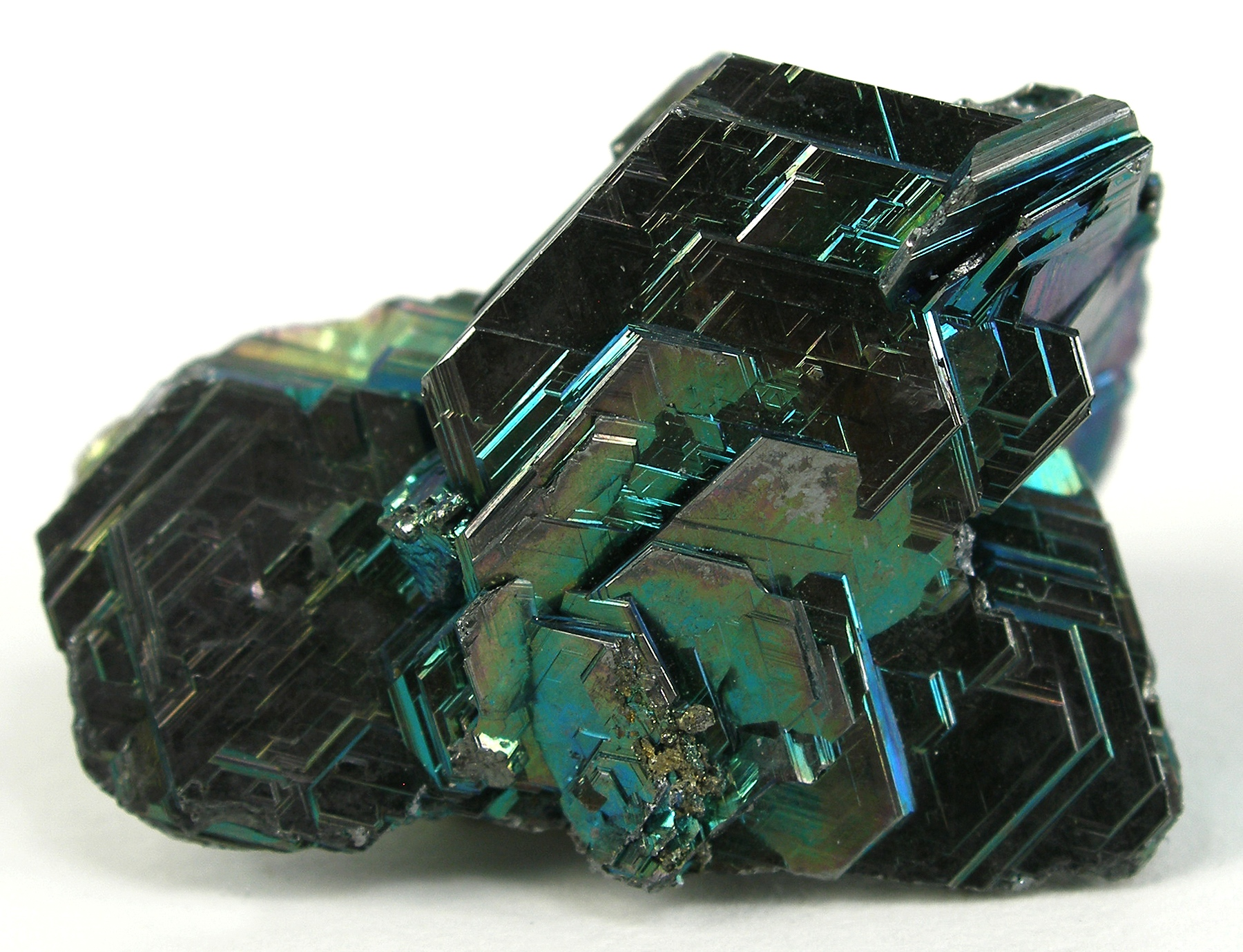
Unusual polybasite specimen from Mayo Mining District, Yukon Territory, Canada.
