= Argentite =

Sulfide mineral

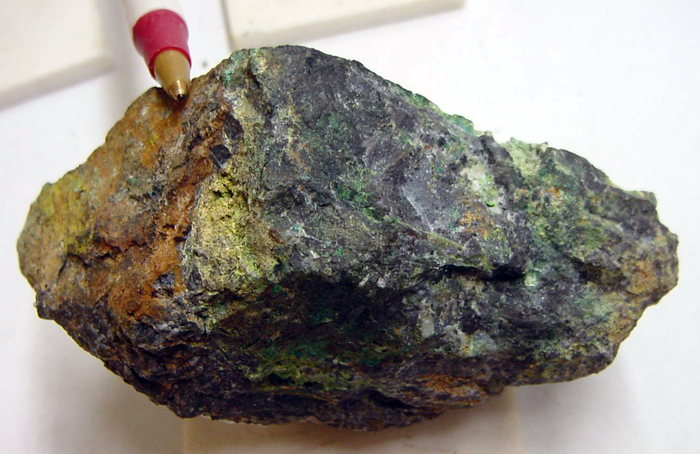
- Argentite sample, with a pen for scale

General
- Category: Minerals
- Formula: Ag_{2}S
- IMA status: Not Approved
- Strunz classification: 2.BA.52
- Crystal system: Isometric
- Crystal class: Sulfide mineral

Identification
- Color: Black, Lead gray
- Cleavage: {001} Poor, {110} Poor
- Fracture: Sectile
- Luster: Metallic
- Streak: Black

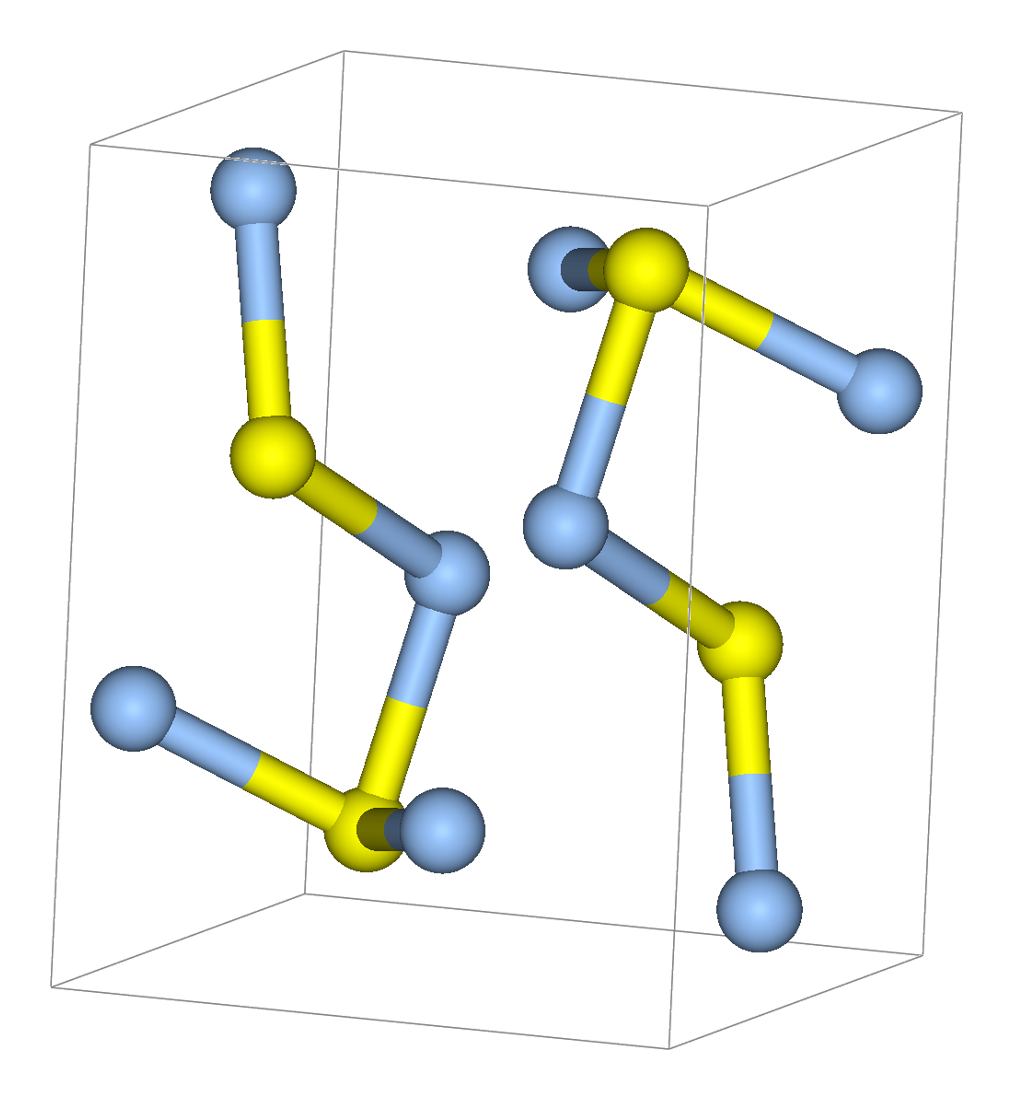
The unit cell of argentite

In mineralogy, argentite (from Latin argentum 'silver') is cubic silver sulfide (Ag_{2}S), which can only exist at temperatures above 173 °C (343 °F), 177 °C (351 °F), or 179 °C (354 °F). When it cools to ordinary temperatures it turns into its monoclinic polymorph, acanthite. The International Mineralogical Association has decided to reject argentite as a proper mineral.

The name "argentite" sometimes also refers to pseudomorphs of argentite: specimens of acanthite which still display some of the outward signs of the cubic crystal form, even though their actual crystal structure is monoclinic due to the lower temperature. This form of acanthite is occasionally found as uneven cubes and octahedra, but more often as dendritic or earthy masses, with a blackish lead-grey color and metallic luster.

Argentite belongs to the galena group. Cleavage, which is so prominent a feature in galena, here presents only in traces. The mineral is perfectly sectile and has a shining streak; hardness 2.5, specific gravity is 7.2–7.4. It occurs in mineral veins, and when found in large masses, as in Mexico and in the Comstock Lode in Nevada, it forms an important ore of silver. The mineral was mentioned in 1529 by G. Agricola, but the name argentite was not used till 1845 and is due to W. Haidinger. Old names for the species are Glaserz, silver-glance and vitreous silver. A related copper-rich mineral occurring e.g. in Jalpa, Zacatecas, Mexico, is known as jalpaite.
