= Silver(I) selenide =

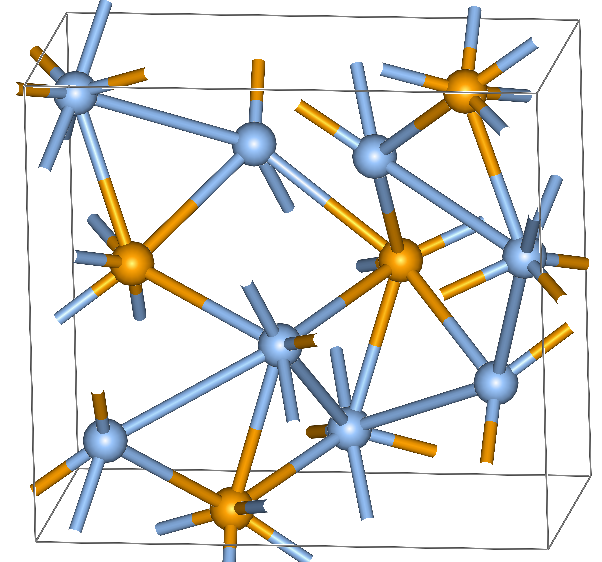
- Silver(I) selenide

Names
- IUPAC name Silver(I) selenide
- Other names Naumannite; Argentous selenide

Identifiers
CAS Number	1302-09-6
3D model (JSmol)	Interactive image
ChemSpider	21170812
ECHA InfoCard	100.013.727
EC Number	215-099-8
PubChem CID	6914520
UNII	QZ0B90W7EQ
CompTox Dashboard (EPA)	DTXSID2061644
- InChI: InChI=1S/2Ag.Se Key: GNWCVDGUVZRYLC-UHFFFAOYSA-N
- SMILES: [Se].[Ag].[Ag]

Properties
Chemical formula	Ag_{2}Se
Molar mass	294.7 g/mol
Density	8.216 g/cm^{3}, solid
Melting point	896.85 °C (1,646.33 °F; 1,170.00 K)
Solubility in water	insoluble
Band gap	0.15 eV

Structure
Crystal structure	orthorhombic, oP12
Space group	P2_{1}2_{1}2_{1}, No. 19

Thermochemistry
Enthalpy of fusion (Δ_{f}H^{⦵}_{fus})	56.9 J/g
- Except where otherwise noted, data are given for materials in their standard state (at 25 °C [77 °F], 100 kPa). verify (what is ?) Infobox references

Silver selenide (Ag_{2}Se) is the reaction product formed when selenium toning analog silver gelatine photo papers in photographic print toning. The selenium toner contains sodium selenite (Na_{2}SeO_{3}) as one of its active ingredients, which is the source of the selenide (Se^{2−}) anion combining with the silver in the toning process.

It is found in nature as the mineral naumannite, a comparatively rare silver mineral which has nevertheless become recognized as important silver compound in some low-sulfur silver ores from mines in Nevada and Idaho.

== Structure ==
Silver selenide has two crystal phases on the bulk phase diagram. At lower temperatures, it has an orthorhombic structure, β-Ag_{2}Se. This orthorhombic phase, stable at room temperature, is a narrow-gap semiconductor, with space group P2_{1}2_{1}2_{1}. The exact size of the band gap has been given variously from 0.02 eV to 0.22 eV.

There is also a high temperature cubic phase, α-Ag_{2}Se., which it transforms into at temperatures above 130 °C. This high temperature phase has space group Im3̅m, No. 229, Pearson symbol cI20. The phase transition increases ionic conductivity by 10,000 times to about 2 S/cm.

A third metastable phase with a monoclinic structure and space group P2_{1}/n is known to form for colloidal Ag_{2}Se nanocrystals. The crystal structure of this polymorph is highly related to the acanthite phase of silver sulfide. For Ag_{2}Se, this polymorph is increasingly unstable for larger crystallites, which explains its absence on the bulk phase diagram. It is thought that the influence of the surface energy plays a role stabilizing this phase on the nanoscale, thus allowing its experimental isolation. Electronic structure calculations for this polymorph of Ag_{2}Se suggest that it is a narrow-gap semiconductor, which is supported by experimental evidence as well. Prior to 2021, the crystal structure of this polymorph was unknown, and this material was informally referred to as a "tetragonal" or "pseudo-tetragonal" polymorph of Ag_{2}Se. This terminology, while not technically correct, is prevalent in the literature pertaining to this metastable phase of Ag_{2}Se.
