= Tenacity (mineralogy) =

Mineral's behavior when deformed or broken

In mineralogy, tenacity is a mineral's resistance to deformation or breakage. Along with hardness, it determines the durability of a mineral.

== Common terms ==
There are several common terms that are used to describe the tenacity of a mineral.

=== Brittleness ===
The mineral breaks or powders easily. Most ionic-bonded minerals are brittle.

=== Malleability ===
The mineral may be pounded out into thin sheets. Metallic-bonded minerals are usually malleable.

=== Ductility ===
The mineral may be drawn into a wire. Ductile materials have to be malleable as well as tough.

=== Sectility ===
May be cut smoothly with a knife. Relatively few minerals are sectile. Sectility is a form of tenacity and can be used to distinguish minerals of similar appearance. Gold, for example, is sectile but pyrite ("fool's gold") is not.

=== Elasticity ===
If bent by an external force, an elastic mineral will spring back to its original shape and size when the stress, that is, the external force, is released.

=== Plasticity ===
If bent by an external force, a plastic mineral will not spring back to its original shape and size when the stress, that is, the external force, is released. It stays bent.
