= Cuprostibite =

Antimonide minerals

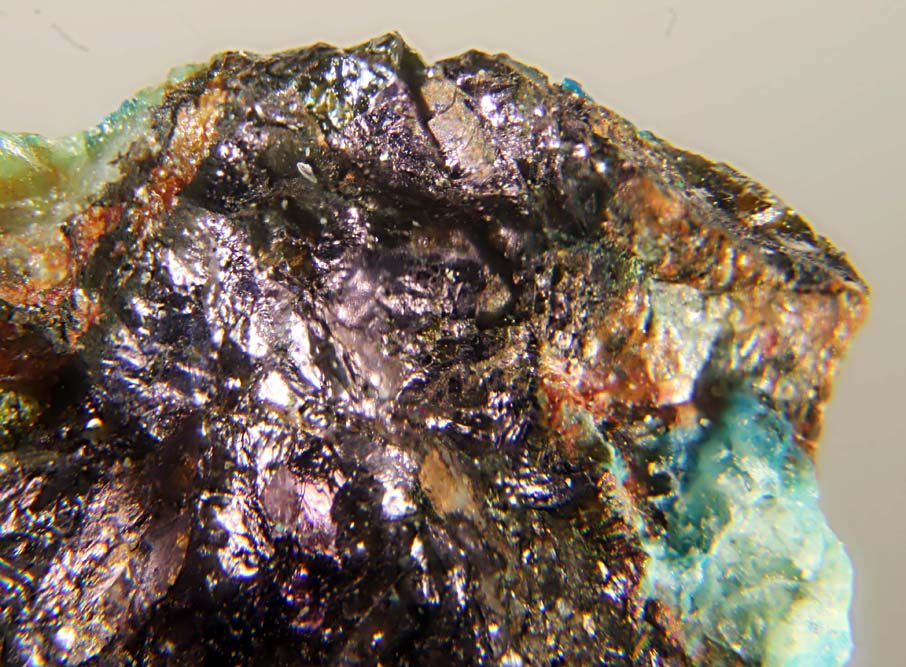
- Cuprostibite (South Greenland)

General
- Category: Antimonide mineral
- Formula: Cu_{2}(Sb,Tl)
- IMA symbol: Cusb
- Strunz classification: 2.AA.20
- Crystal system: Tetragonal
- Crystal class: Antimonide

Identification
- Color: violet pink to steel gray; red-violet tint on fresh fracture
- Crystal habit: fine grained aggregates
- Twinning: platy
- Cleavage: perfect to average
- Fracture: irregular to uneven
- Mohs scale hardness: 4
- Luster: metallic
- Diaphaneity: opaque
- Density: 8.42 (calculated)
- Pleochroism: visible; creamy white to dark rose-violet

Cuprostibite (the name is formed from the addition of two words: cuprum and stibium) — a very rare polymetallic mineral of the sulfide class, consisting of mixed copper and thallium stibnite (although not in all samples), sometimes with admixtures of tin and other metals, ideal formula Cu_{2}(Sb,Tl) or Cu_{2}Sb. The mineral is opaque, it has a metallic luster and a beautiful color from steel gray to violet-pink when freshly chipped.

Cuprostibite was discovered in South Greenland (1964) and described in 1969 by a group of scientists, which included Evgeny Semyonov, Henning Sorensen, Marianna Bezsmertnaya and Evgenia Khalezova.

== Discovery history and name ==
A new, previously unknown mineral was found in 1964 by Evgeny Semyonov and H. Sorensen during a joint expedition to South Greenland, and chemical and optical analysis and identification of the mineral were carried out by them together with Marianna Bezsmertnaya on the basis of the Moscow Institute of Mineralogy, Geochemistry and Crystal Chemistry of Rare Elements. More detailed data about the mineral were obtained later by S. B. Maslenkov using an X-ray microprobe at the Institute of Ferrous Metals.

In 1969, Evgeny Semyonov described the history of the discovery of the mineral in a separate book dedicated to the expedition to South Greenland and the mineralogy of this area:

Cuprostibite <...> discovered by E. I. Semenov and H. Sorensen and studied by them together with M. S. Bezsmertnaya. The mineral is found in the large ussingite pegmatite of Mount Nakalak <Nakkaalaaq> in association with minute Loellingite segregations. Cuprostibite forms opaque grains 1-2 mm in size, black, and on fresh chips steel-gray in color with a distinct violet-red tint. The lustre is strong, metallic. <...> The mineral is soft.

Cuprostibite was originally defined as a natural copper stibnite with the formula Cu_{5}Sb_{2} and was considered as such for almost five years. It received its name, consisting of two roots, in 1969 — according to the composition that was considered relevant at that time. Thallium, periodically detected in the composition of cuprostibite, was initially attributed to the number of impurities introduced from surrounding rocks and minerals, in particular chalcotallite. Meanwhile, the formula of the mineral was refined in the late 1990s to the modern form Cu_{2}(Sb,Tl), when it was determined that if present in the mineral (up to 3 wt%) thallium is included in its chemical composition. Also, sulfur was found in some samples from the type deposit of Mount Nakkaalaaq (Greenland), so the proportional formula for Greenland cuprostibite increased to four components: Cu_{2.00}(Sb_{0.82}S_{0.08}Tl_{0.04})_{Σ=0.94}

However, the name of the mineral remains the same. Cuprostibite samples obtained from the Greenlandic Kangerdluarsuk plateau and from the Swedish Langbaan do not contain thallium and sulfur impurities. Their ideal formula is also different from the original one and looks like Cu_{2}Sb.

== Properties ==
According to the first detailed description of the discoverer of the mineral Evgeny Semyonov, cuprostibite forms opaque granular aggregates and small black phenocrysts no larger than 1-2 mm in size. On fresh chips, the color is steel-gray with a distinct violet-red tint, but the fracture quickly oxidizes and loses its bright color. The shine is strong, metallic. The fracture is uneven. Sometimes cleavage is found, corresponding to a vaguely expressed tabularity. Lamellar twins are observed. The mineral is soft. Hardness — 220 kg/mm^{2}.

According to the studies of Marianna Bezsmertnaya, carried out in 1969 with samples of the mineral from a typical deposit in Greenland, in reflected light cuprostibite under a microscope has a distinct violet-pinkish tint, its reflectivity is high, the effects of anisotropy with crossed nicols are strong colored, noticeable in air double reflection; light sections are creamy-whitish, dark sections are pinkish-violet. There is a strong dispersion of the main indicators of reflection and double reflection.

One of the striking features inherent in cuprostibite is its ability to form the finest polymineral mixtures, the size of metal particles in which varies from several tens of microns to 100-200 Å. The stability of such mixtures over a long geological time (at least 200-250 million years) can only be ensured by their isolated position inside dense host rocks.

== Mineral formation ==
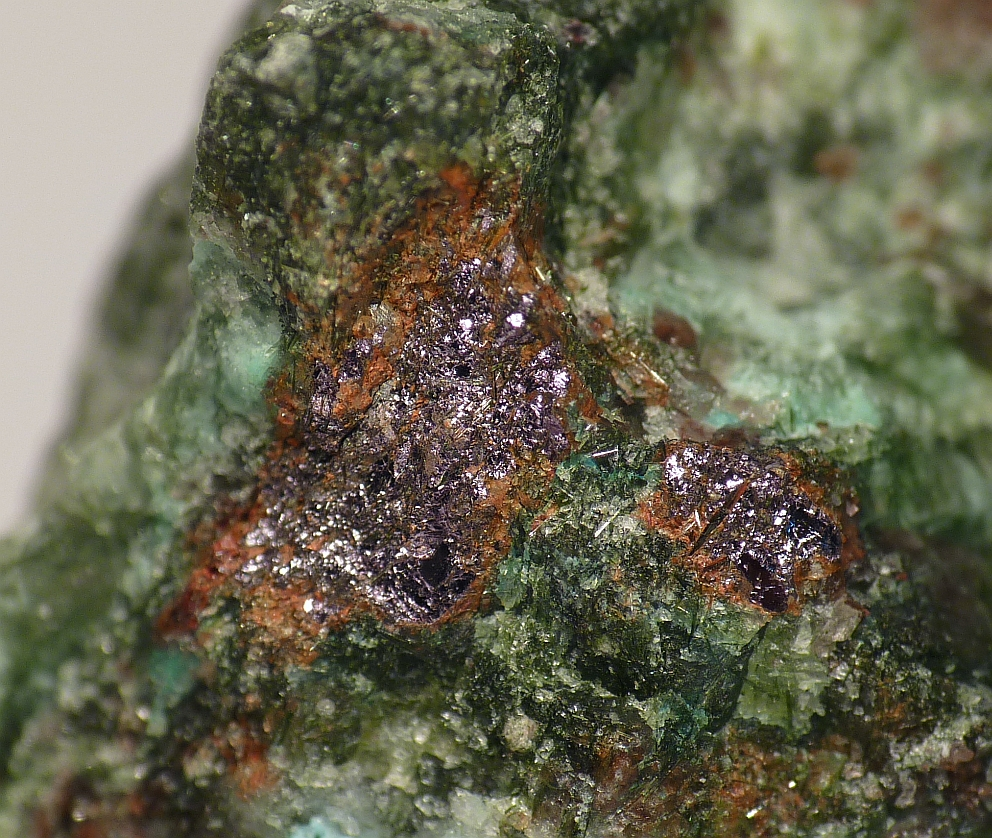
Cuprostibite (Nakkaalaaq, Ilímaussaq complex, Narsaq, Kujalleq, Greenland) frame size ~ 18 mm.

Cuprostibite was discovered by Evgeny Semyonov and co-authors in alkaline rocks of the Illímaussaq massif, South Greenland. This deposit was studied in more detail by S. Karup-Muller and co-authors. Cuprostibite, similar in composition to Cu_{2}Sb, was encountered by him within the Ilimuassak massif at several points: in ussingite veins that cross-cut nauaite and are closely associated with lujavrite veins and aeginized nauaite, in analcime-aegirine veins located in the contact zone between nauaite and lujavrite, in sodalite-analcime rocks.

Subsequently, the mineral was also found in Europe and North America, where it is found most often in veins of syenite-sodalites or mineralized dolomites. Type deposit — original discovery site, Mount Nakkaalaaq, Greenland.

For the first time in the USSR, cuprostibite was discovered in the early 1980s by Margarita Novgorodova in the Kumak-Kotansu shear zone in the Southern Urals.

Later, cuprostibite was established and diagnosed in the Zolotaya Gora deposit (Chelyabinsk region, Karabash urban district, Soymonovskaya valley); in the Kumak gold-bearing region (Orenburg region, Yasnensky district) and in Tajikistan at the Bolshoi Kanimansur silver-lead-zinc deposit (Sughd region, Adrasman-Kanimansur ore field).

== See also ==
- Bezsmertnovite
- Semenovite
- Avicennite
- Montbrayite
- Nagyágite
