= Bessmertny =

Bessmertny, Bezsmertnyi or Bezsmertny (Ukrainian: Безсмертний; Belarusian: Бяссмертны; Russian: Бессмертный, meaning immortal) is a Ukrainian and Belarusian masculine surname. Its feminine counterpart is Bezsmertna (Ukrainian: Безсмертна) or Bessmertnaya (Russian).

Notable people with the surname include:

- Anatoliy Bezsmertnyi (born 1969), Ukrainian footballer
- Dmitry Bessmertny (born 1997), Belarusian footballer
- Marianna Bezsmertnaya (1915–1991), Russian geologist and mineralogist
- Olga Bezsmertna (born 1983), Ukrainian soprano
- Roman Bezsmertnyi (born 1965), Ukrainian politician
- Stanislav Bessmertny (born 2004), Russian footballer
- Vladimir Bezsmertny (1912–2002), Russian geologist and mineralogist
- Yuri Bessmertny (born 1987), Belarusian Muay Thai kickboxer

== See also ==
- Koschei Bessmertny, an archetypal male antagonist in Slavic fairy tales
- Kashchey Bessmertnyi (album) by the Russian punk group Sektor Gaza
- Bezsmertnovite
