= Chvilevaite =

Sulfide polymetallic minerals

General
- Category: Sulfide mineral
- Formula: Na(Cu,Fe,Zn)_{2}S_{4} or Na(Cu,Fe,Zn)_{2}S_{2}
- IMA symbol: Cvi
- Strunz classification: 2.FB.10
- Crystal system: Trigonal
- Crystal class: Sulfide

Identification
- Color: bronze when freshly chipped, gradually blackening to sooty
- Crystal habit: in the form of free grains and small aggregates
- Cleavage: Perfect on {0001}
- Fracture: irregular to uneven
- Mohs scale hardness: 3
- Luster: metallic
- Diaphaneity: opaque
- Density: 3.94 (calculated)
- Pleochroism: distinct, from pale orange to dark gray with a lilac tint.

Chvilevaite (Russian: чвилеваи́т, чвилёваи́т, in its own name) is a rare hydrothermal polymetallic mineral from the class of complex sulfides, forming microscopic grains in related minerals, its composition is a rare combination of alkali (combining lithophile) and chalcophile metals — sodium ferro-sulfide, zinc and copper with the calculation formula Na(Cu,Fe,Zn)_{2}S_{4}, originally published and confirmed as Na(Cu,Fe,Zn)_{2}S_{2}.

The new mineral was studied, described and identified in 1985-1986 and named in honor of Tatyana Chvileva, a leading employee of the Institute of Mineralogy, Geochemistry and Crystal Chemistry of Rare Elements, a mineralogist at the Mineragraphy Cabinet.

== Discovery history and name ==
Initially, a new mineral of the approximate composition Na(Cu,Fe,Zn)_{2}S_{2} was discovered as very small grains of inclusion in archival samples of sphalerite from the Akatuy lead-zinc deposit (Alexandrovo-Zavodsky district of the Trans-Baikal Territory), obtained by the microscopy laboratory of the IMGRE from the funds of the Mineralogical Museum of the Academy of Sciences USSR. Monomineral grains of the future chvilevaite had sizes from 0.01 to 0.5 mm, but, as a rule, did not reach the maximum size, occurring mainly in the smallest varieties (from 0.01 to 0.05 mm). Therefore, the establishment of a new mineral species occurred mainly by subtle instrumental methods, based on the results of microscopic and X-ray studies. The group of scientists who discovered and identified the new mineral described their discovery as follows:

Chvilevaite was found as free grains and intergrowths in crushed sphalerite samples containing a small amount of galena, pyrite, quartz, carbonates, single grains of boulangerite, covellite, chalcocite and arsenopyrite. The new mineral is most often found in close intergrowth with covellite, in the mass of which relics of galena are recorded. Covellite replaces chvilevaite and galena, often with the formation of complex myrmekite intergrowths. Covellite and galena associated with chvilevaite contain an increased amount of sodium (%) — up to 1.38 and 0.87, respectively. Chvilevaite is also observed in intergrowth with chalcocite, occasionally with arsenopyrite, sphalerite, quartz and organic matter. Monomineral grains of new alkali sulphide have sizes of 0.01-0.5 mm, usually 0.01-0.05 mm.

The new mineral was approved on June 22, 1987, by the Commission on New Minerals and Mineral Names (CNMMN) of the International Mineralogical Association (IMA, Protocol No. 5). It was named in honor of the authoritative mineralogist and mineralographer Tatyana Chvileva, whose scientific portfolio at that time already included four new discovered mineral species. Type material and reference samples of the mineral are stored in the Fersman Moscow Mineralogical Museum.

== Properties ==
External image
- Chvilevaite (Fersman Museum)

Chvilevaite is a pronounced hydrothermal metasomatic mineral from the class of complex sulfides. It is one of the rare minerals with unusual chemistry, combining lithophile (Na) and chalcophile (Cu, Fe, Zn) elements in its composition. In addition to chvilevaite itself, such minerals also include djerfisherite K_{6}(Cu,Fe,Ni)_{23}S_{26}Cl and murunskite K_{2}Cu_{3}FeS_{3}. In addition, until the 2020s, chvilevaite was the only find of a sulfide mineral with sodium content in ore deposits. The other two listed in this series are potassium minerals.

The color of the mineral on fresh chips is bronze (similar to bornite), like many ore sulfides, it quickly oxidizes and fades to a sooty black tint, the luster is metallic, and in air it quickly oxidizes and becomes tarnished. In reflected light, Chvilevait is orange; over time it also darkens and modulates towards pink-violet or purple. Pleochroism is distinct, from pale orange to dark gray with a lilac tint. The mineral is highly anisotropic, the effect is distinct, ranging from black to white. Hardness is low, no more than 3; cleavage is perfect along {0001}, the mineral is brittle.

Chvilevaite forms tabular, prismatic crystals; individual grains do not exceed 0.5 mm. The shape of the deposits is quite diverse: lamellar, prismatic, irregular and isometric, but lamellar scaly deposits with good cleavage predominate. Taking into account the constantly occurring fluctuations in the content of all elements in the mineral, in 1988 the general formula of chvilevaite was presented in proportional form, as (Na_{2,00}Ca_{0,03})_{2,03}(Cu_{2,56}Fe_{O,88}Zn_{0,43}As_{0,03}Mn_{0,005})_{3,90}S_{4,06}. The idealized formula was Na(Cu,Fe,Zn)_{2}S_{2}, and minor amounts of arsenic and manganese were classified as impurities.

X-ray studies of the crystal lattice of chvilevaite showed that the new mineral has a trigonal system and is not a structural analogue of the only known mineral with a related composition at that time, tetragonal murunskite К_{2}Cu_{3}FeS_{4}. The research results showed that the symmetry, unit cell parameters of chvilevaite, as well as interatomic distances fixed from the Paterson function are close to wurtzite; atoms (Cu, Fe, Zn) jointly occupy tetrahedral voids in a hexagonal close packing (like wurtzite) of sulfur atoms: Na atom can be located in one of 2 octahedral voids in the unit cell. Copper, iron and zinc atoms together occupy half of the tetrahedral voids, but unlike wurtzite, in chvilevaite tetrahedral voids of different orientations are filled, having common edges and forming dense tetrahedral layers. Sodium atoms occupy half of the octahedral voids layer by layer, which leads to the appearance of a metallic luster in the crystals. In the structure along the c axis, dense layers of (Cu, Fe, Zn) tetrahedra alternate with looser layers of NaS6 octahedra, which fully explains the perfect cleavage along (0001).

A very similar crystalline structure, although dissimilar space groups, characterizes the whole family of chvilevaite-like synthetic sulfides and selenides: Na(CuFe)S_{2}, Li(CuFe)S_{2}, Li(CuFe)Se_{2} and others. It is significant that replacing layers of sodium or lithium atoms with layers of larger potassium, cesium or thallium ions automatically leads to a transition from the trigonal chvilevaite structural type to the tetragonal bukovite structural type. In particular, murunskite, found on Mount Koashva in pegmatites of the same type as the new mineral orikite discovered in the Khibiny Mountains in 2007, has a similar crystal structure. However, a detailed X-ray study and modeling of the powder pattern of the found orikite showed that this mineral and chvilevaite are most likely not direct structural analogues.

== Mineral formation ==
External image
- Chvilevaite (four photos)

Chvilevaite of the Akatui deposit was first found in the form of free grains and intergrowths in crushed sphalerite samples containing small amounts of galena, pyrite, quartz, carbonates, as well as single grains of boulangerite, covellite, chalcocite and arsenopyrite. This mineral is most often found in close intergrowths with covellite, in the mass of which relics of galena are recorded, and covellite often replaces chvilevaite and galena with the formation of complex myrmekite growths. Chvilevaite is also observed intergrown with chalcocite, occasionally with arsenopyrite, sphalerite, quartz and organic matter. Thus, typical associations for chvilevaite are minerals of hydrothermal veins: sphalerite, covellite, chalcocite, galena, pyrite, boulangerite, arsenopyrite, carbonates and quartz.

The Akatui lead-zinc ore field, typical for chvilevaite, is more than indicative of its genesis. The main ore minerals are galena, sphalerite, pyrite, arsenopyrite, boulangerite and pyrrhotite. To a depth of 40–80 meters, the ores are highly oxidized and are represented by a mixture of limonite, cerussite, smithsonite and the remains of undecomposed galena with quartz. Sulfide-containing minerals such as pyrite and chvilevaite are present in significant quantities in stockpiles and tailings.

In addition to the Akatui deposit, Chvilevaite has been established throughout the world in sulfide lead-zinc deposits with similar conditions, in particular in Hungary, Chile and the mines of Saint-Hilaire, Quebec. However, rarely where the size of the discharge of this mineral even slightly exceeds the immediately established 0.5 mm.

== See also ==
- Bezsmertnovite
- Semenovite
- Avicennite
- Bilibinskite
- Bogdanovite
- Volynskite
- Djerfisherite

== Publications ==
- Kachalovskaya V.M., Osipov B.S., Nazarenko N.G., Kukoev V.A., Mazmanyan V.O., Egorov I.N., Kaplunnik L.N. Chvilevait — is a new alkali metal sulfide with the composition Na(Cu,Fe,Zn)_{2}S_{2}. — Moscow: Notes of the Russian Mineralogical Society, volume 117, No. 2, 1988. — p. 204-207. (in Russian)
- Jambor, John L., Vanko, David A. (1989) New mineral names. American Mineralogist, 74 (7–8) p.946-951
- Kaplunnik, L.N., Petrova, I.V., Pobedimskaya, E.A., Kachalovskaya, V.M., Osipov, B.S. (1990) Crystal structure of the natural alkaline sulfide chvilevaite Na(Cu,Fe,Zn)_{2}S_{2}. Doklady Akademii Nauk SSSR: 310: 90–93. (in Russian)
- Kaplunnik, L.N., Petrova, I.V., Pobedimskaya, E.A., Kachalovskaya, V.M., Osipov, B.S. (1990) Crystal structure of natural alkaline sulfide, chvilevaite, Na(Cu,Fe,Zn)_{2}S_{2}. Soviet Physics - Doklady: 35: 6–8. (in Russian)
