= Gold sulfide =

Gold sulfide may refer to:

- Gold(I) sulfide
- Gold(III) sulfide
