= Marianna Bezsmertnaya =

Soviet geologist, mineralogist (1915–1991)

- Russian: Мариа́нна Серге́евна Безсме́ртная (Юркевич)
- Born: 2 May 1915; Moscow
- Died: 1991 (aged 75–76)
- Education: Moscow Geological Prospecting Institute
- Scientific career
- Fields: geology mineralogy petrography petrology
- Workplaces: Institute of Mineralogy, Geochemistry and Crystal Chemistry of Rare Elements

Marianna Sergeevna Bezsmertnaya, née Yurkevich (Russian: Мариа́нна Серге́евна Безсме́ртная (Юркевич); 2 May 1915 – 1991) was a Soviet and Russian geologist, mineralogist, petrographer and petrologist, candidate of geological and mineralogical sciences (1957), developer of new methods for diagnosing minerals, active participant and author of the discovery of a number of new minerals. For 25 years, she was a leading employee of the Moscow Institute of Mineralogy, Geochemistry and Crystal Chemistry of Rare Elements, the author of new methods for determining minerals. In the late 1950s to early 1960s, she re-checked and revised the mineralogical collection of the institute.

In 1979, in honor of Marianna Bezsmertnaya and her husband Vladimir Bezsmertny (1912-2002), a new mineral found in Kamchatka, bezsmertnovite, was named in composition — a complex plumbotelluride of gold, copper, iron and silver, the brightness of the color surpasses even gold.

== Biography ==
External image
- photograph of Marianna Bezsmertnaya

Marianna Yurkevich was born in Moscow. Her father, Sergei Yurkevich, was a zemstvo doctor, mother is a rural teacher. After the early death of her husband in 1922, her mother continued to teach literature in Moscow schools. In 1929, Marianna entered the geological prospecting technical school, and then, from 1933 to 1938, she studied at the Moscow Geological Prospecting Institute. In 1941 she was sent into evacuation, first in the Ryazan region, and then further to Frunze. In 1941–1945, Marianna Yurkevich was the head of the geological party of the Kyrgyz Geological Department of the Ministry of Geology.

In the last year of the war she worked at the Kirovograd Geological Department, then returned to Moscow. In 1945–1950, she successively held the positions of senior laboratory assistant, assistant and, finally, junior researcher at the Institute of Non-Ferrous Metals and Gold named after M.I. Kalinin. She spent the next seven years (1950–1957) in the Altai polymetallic expedition, first as a geologist and then as head of the geological party.

Back in Moscow, in 1957 she defended her thesis for the title of candidate of sciences. In the same year, she joined the Moscow Institute of Mineralogy, Geochemistry and Crystal Chemistry of Rare Elements (IMGRI), where she worked until 1988, first as a junior researcher in the mineralogy department, and from 1962 as a senior researcher in the specialty “Mineralogy and Petrography”. She worked for a long time in the mineragraphy room, and for more than ten years she held the position of head of the ore microscopy room. Her area of specialization was the field of microscopic studies of ores. During her work at IMGRI, she was responsible for ten scientific topics.

For almost fifty years, Marianna Bezsmertnaya was married to the famous Moscow geologist, specialist in the field of geology of ore deposits, associate professor at the Polytechnic and Pedagogical Institute Vladimir Bezsmertny, with whom they formed a productive scientific tandem in the 1950-1970s. Most of the positions that Marianna Bezsmertnaya held after 1940 were, in one way or another, related to her husband’s service record. V. Bezsmertny himself came from a family known in Moscow geological and mineralogical circles. As the son of a Baku feldsher, he was the nephew of Maria Bezsmertnaya (Bessmertnaya), an assistant and confidant of Vladimir Vernadsky, who stood at the origins of Soviet biochemistry in the late 1910s. In 1918–1919 In the Kyiv biochemical laboratory of the sugar producers' syndicate, Vernadsky organized the first studies to determine the chemical composition of living organisms. Maria the Immortal took an active part in conducting these experiments. Academician Vernadsky’s personal connection with Vladimir Bezsmertny was interrupted only in 1945, after Vernadsky’s death.

In 1979, a new gold-bearing mineral, bezsmertnovite, was named in honor of Marianna Bezsmertnaya and her husband. This mineral was found a year earlier by a geological exploration party at the Aginskoye gold deposit (Central Kamchatka, Bystrinsky district). The authors of the discovery were Moscow geologists-mineralogists E.M. Spiridonov and T.N. Chvileva. At the same time, it was Marianna Bezsmertnaya who insisted on including her husband’s name in the nomination list of the mineral Bezsmertnovite, thus designating herself as an integral part of the family scientific tandem. This was her only request or an important condition put forward to Tatyana Chvileva and Ernst Spiridonov when nominating the mineral for approval by the commission of the Academy of Sciences and the Ministry of Geology of the USSR in 1979. Otherwise, she would not have given her consent to such a name for the mineral.

Marianna Bezsmertnaya was awarded the honorary badge “Excellence in Subsoil Exploration of the USSR”. As a leading specialist in her field, she was a member of the Scientific Council of the USSR Ministry of Geosciences on the problems of new methods for diagnosing minerals, she was also a member of the French Mineralogical Society and a member of the Commission of the International Mineralogical Association (Cambridge, UK). Until 1988, Marianna Bezsmertnaya continued to work at IMGRI. She died in 1991 in Moscow.

== Scientific activity ==
All scientific works of Marianna Bezsmertnaya date back to 1957 and are associated exclusively with her activities in the framework of microscopic studies of ores in the ore microscopy room of the IMGRI. As a co-author of works on optical methods for studying minerals, she was distinguished by her scrupulous professionalism, as well as her breadth and liberality of views. She became widely known in professional circles as the discoverer of several minerals, including, first of all, volynskite, as well as chalcothallite, cuprostibite and bilibinskite. The last of these became the title mineral for a new category of rare ore tellurides, called the “bilibinskite group”, which later also included bogdanovite, bezsmertnovite, rickardite and other new minerals.

The main achievement of Marianna Bezsmertnaya in the field of optical analysis of minerals was the monograph “Determination of tellurides under a microscope” published in 1969 (co-authored with L. Logikova and L. Soboleva), which not only made her name, but became a serious milestone in the identification and analysis of the whole group minerals, until that moment poorly studied and little known even to specialists. Until the mid-1960s, information about many tellurides in Soviet and world mineralogy remained so vague that it allowed M. S. Bezsmertnaya in 1965 to use the following formulation in this regard: «...published laboratory and analytical information about calaverite and krennerite are so contradictory and confusing that they completely exclude the possibility of using them for diagnostic purposes...»

Developing this topic, the authors of the monograph noted in the preface to the first edition that “... the current state of knowledge of tellurides does not provide a sufficiently reliable determination of them...” It was precisely this state of mineralogy in the late 1960s that led to the need for science to reach a new level studying minerals.

In the process of creating standards, the authors came to the conclusion that difficulties in collecting ore minerals of rare elements arise not in isolated cases, but systematically. The main reason for this is that currently we approach the study of minerals from a different methodological position. Most of the old and relatively old data available in the literature were obtained without microscopic control of the studied objects. The use of such control, as well as other modern diagnostic methods listed above, often leads to discrepancies between newly obtained data and old information, even for the same samples.

The purpose of publishing the work was precisely to radically change the existing situation. And if before the publication of M. Bezsmertnaya’s monograph, many of the gold-silver tellurides and similar polymetallic ores were considered non-existent or not found on the territory of the USSR, then the 1970s radically changed this state of affairs.

From the mid-1960s and the first part of the 1970s, Marianna Bezsmertnaya worked in close and productive collaboration with Tatyana Chvileva, Candidate of Mineralogical Sciences, who was under her supervision. Together they were engaged in the development and improvement of modern methods for diagnosing microsegregations of ore minerals in reflected light. In the course of systematic research, the reflection spectra of more than 300 minerals were studied and classified and, most importantly, the dependence of reflection on compositional variations in isomorphic groups was revealed, which made it possible to perform microdiagnostics with previously inaccessible accuracy.

Already in the late 1970s, research carried out by M. Bezsmertnaya and T. Chvileva made it possible to discover and study in detail a previously unknown group of gold minerals, in which at least three minerals new to science were found and described in detail. In 1982, based on the results of the work carried out, a new group of bilibinskite was described.

External image
- Bezsmertnovite (Trixie Mine, Utah)

One of the new minerals of this group was bezsmertnovite, named after M. S. Bezsmertnaya; in composition — plumbotelluride of copper and gold (with the presence of silver and iron), discovered in 1978 and a year later received a name approved by the international association.

== Minerals co-authored by M. Bezsmertnaya ==
- 1965 — Volynskite
- 1968 — Chalcothallite
- 1969 — Cuprostibite
- 1979 — Bilibinskite

== Publications ==
- Bezsmertnaya M. S. On the issue of syngeneticity of Altai polymetallic ores and host rocks. 1957. (in Russian)
- Bezsmertnaya M. S., Gorzhevsky D. I. Near-ore changes in polymetallic deposits of Altai. — News of the USSR Academy of Sciences, Geological Series, No. 10, 1958. (in Russian)
- Bezsmertnaya M. S., Soboleva L. N. New bismuth and silver telluride, established by the latest micromethods. — Publishing House of the Academy of Sciences USSR, 1963, proceedings of IMGRE, issue 18 (in Russian)
- Bezsmertnaya M. S. Rare elements in gold deposits of the Soviet Union. — Proceedings of СNIGRI, 1967, issue 76 (in Russian)
- Bezsmertnaya M. S., Soboleva L. N. About volynskite — a new telluride of bismuth and silver. In the collection: Experimental and methodological studies of ore minerals. Dedicated in memory of prof. I. S. Volynsky. Responsible editors M. S. Bezsmertnaya and V. G. Feklichev. — Moscow: Nauka, 1965. — 304 p. (in Russian)
- Bezsmertnaya M. S., Logikova L. A., Soboleva L. N. Determination of tellurides under a microscope. — Moscow: Nauka, 1969. — 175 p. (in Russian)
- Spiridonov E., Bezsmertnaya M., Chvileva T., Bezsmertny V. Bilibinskite, Au_{3}Cu_{2}PbTe_{2}, a new mineral gold-telluride deposits. Intern. Geol. Rev. 1979. Vol. 21. P. 1411–1415.
