= Tatiana Chvileva =

Soviet mineralogist (1925–2000)

- Born: January 7, 1925

Tatiana Nikiforovna Chvileva (Russian: Чвилёва Татья́на Ники́форовна; 7 January 1925 – March 2000) was a Soviet and Russian mineralogist, petrographer and petrologist, candidate of geological and mineralogical sciences (1962), developer of new methods for diagnosing minerals, active participant and author of the discovery of a number of new minerals. For more than 30 years, she has been a leading employee of the Moscow Institute of Mineralogy, Geochemistry and Crystal Chemistry of Rare Elements, developer of new methods for diagnosing minerals, mineralogist at the mineragraphy office.

During the 1970s — 1980s, Tatyana Chvileva co-authored the discovery of several new minerals, primarily bilibinskite, velikite, bezsmertnovite, gruzdevite and thallium-containing hakite. In 1988, a new polymetallic mineral, chvilevaite (Russian: чвилеваит, чвилёваит), found in Transbaikalia, was named in honor of Tatyana Chvileva; its composition is ferro-sulfide of sodium, zinc and copper with the formula Na(Cu,Fe,Zn)_{2}S_{2}. By decision of the International Mineralogical Association, Tatyana Chvileva was included in the encyclopedia of famous geologists and mineralogists of the world.

External image
- photograph of Tatyana Chvileva

Tatyana Chvileva is the author of five monographs and more than eight dozen scientific articles. She made a significant contribution to the complex problem of diagnosing ore minerals and brought domestic science to a new level. Since the late 1980s, her definitive monographs have served as a textbook for students of Russian universities.

== Publications ==
- Spiridonov E., Bezsmertnaya M., Chvileva T., Bezsmertny V. (1979) Bilibinskite, Au_{3}Cu_{2}PbTe_{2}, a new mineral gold-telluride deposits. Intern. Geol. Rev.; V.H. Winston and Sons, Inc (United States). Vol. 21. P. 1411–1415.
- Spiridonov E.M., Chvileva T.N. (1982) New gold minerals group — bilibinskite group (plumbo- and stibioplumbotellurides of gold. — IMA-82. 13th General. Meet, Varna, p. 72
- Spiridonov E.M., Chvileva T.N., Badalov A.S. (1984) Antimony-bearing colusite, Cu_{26}V_{2}As_{2}Sb_{2}Sn_{2}S_{32}, of the Kairagach deposit and on the varieties of colusite. — International Geology Review, V.H. Winston and Sons, Inc (United States), vol. 26, No. 4, pp. 534-539
- Gruzdev V. S., Volgin V. Y., Spiridonov E. M., Kaplunnik L. N., Pobedimskaya Y. A., Chvileva T. N., Chernitsova N. M. (1988) Velikite Сu_{2}HgSnS_{4} — the mercury member of the stannite group. — М.: Maik Nauka. Interperiodica Publishing, Doklady Earth Sciences, vol. 300, pp. 432–435.
