= Vladimir Bezsmertny =

Soviet geologist, mineralogist (1912–2002)

Vladimir Vasilyevich Bezsmertny (Russian: Влади́мир Васи́льевич Безсме́ртный; 6 May 1912 – 2002) was a Russian geologist, mineralogist, petrographer and petrologist, candidate of geological and mineralogical sciences, specialist in the field of ore deposits, associate professor at the Moscow Pedagogical Institute.

In 1978, Vladimir Bezsmertny became one of the authors of the discovery of another new mineral, bilibinskite. Four years later, this mineral became the title mineral for a new group of polymetallic tellurides called the bilibinskite group.

In 1979, in honor of Vladimir Bezsmertny and his wife Marianna Bezsmertnaya (1915-1991), a new mineral found in Kamchatka, bezsmertnovite, was named in composition — a complex plumbotelluride of gold, copper, iron and silver, the brightness of the color surpasses even gold.

== Publications ==
- Spiridonov E. [in Russian]; Bezsmertnaya M.; Chvileva T.; Bezsmertny V., eds. (1979). "Bilibinskite, Au_{3}Cu_{2}PbTe_{2} — a new mineral gold-telluride deposits". Intern. Geol. Rev. (in Russian). 21: 1411–1415.
