= Dyscrasite =

Silver antimonide mineral

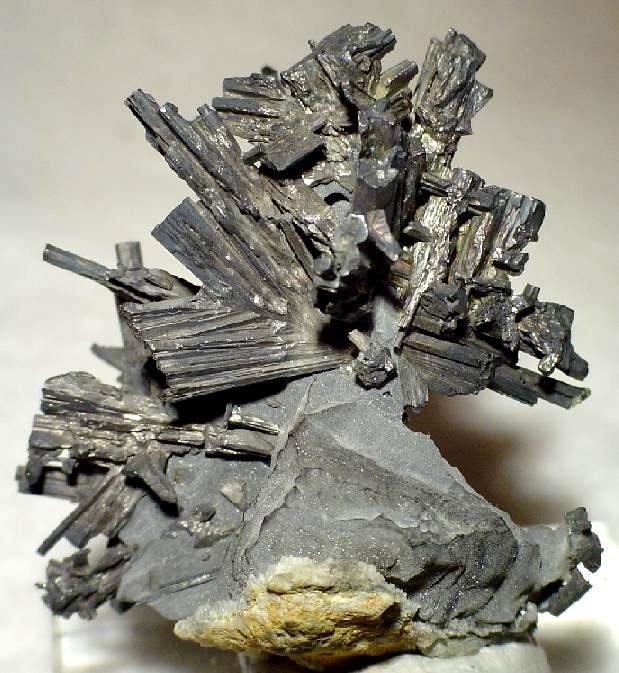
- Twinned dyscrasite crystals from the Czech Republic (size: 4.5 × 4.5 × 3.3 cm)

General
- Category: Antimonide minerals
- Formula: Ag_{3+x}Sb_{1−x} (x ≈ 0.2)
- IMA symbol: Dys
- Strunz classification: 2.AA.35
- Crystal system: Orthorhombic
- Crystal class: Pyramidal (mm2); H-M symbol: (mm2)
- Space group: Pmm2
- Unit cell: a = 3.008, b = 4.828 c = 5.214 [Å]; Z = 1

Identification
- Color: Silver-white (tarnishes to lead-gray, yellowish, or black)
- Crystal habit: Pyramidal crystals also cylindrical, prismatic to platy, striated; granular, foliated or massive
- Twinning: On {110} produces pseudohexagonal forms
- Cleavage: Distinct on {001} {001}, imperfect on {110}
- Fracture: Irregular or uneven
- Tenacity: Sectile
- Mohs scale hardness: 3 1/2 – 4
- Luster: Metallic
- Streak: Silver-white
- Diaphaneity: Opaque
- Specific gravity: 9.4 – 10
- Birefringence: Very weak
- Pleochroism: Very weak
- Other characteristics: Weakly anisotropic

The silver antimonide mineral dyscrasite has the chemical formula Ag_{3}Sb. It is an opaque, silver white, metallic mineral which crystallizes in the orthorhombic crystal system. It forms pyramidal crystals up to 5 cm (2.0 in) and can also form cylindrical and prismatic crystals.

== Crystallography and properties ==
Dyscrasite is a metal ore and is opaque. In reflected light, however, it demonstrates weak anisotropism. Dyscrasite’s color under plane polarized light is most likely dark grey/black. When spun on a rotatable stage of a microscope (under plane polarized light), dyscrasite’s color should slightly change shades. This property is called pleochroism. Dyscrasite exhibits very weak reflected light pleochroism.

Dyscrasite belongs to the orthorhombic crystal class, meaning all three of its axes (a, b, and c) are unequal in length and are 90° to each other.

== Discovery and occurrence ==
It was first described for an occurrence in 1797 in the Wenzel Mine, Black Forest, Germany. The name dyscrasite comes from the Greek word δυσκράσις, meaning "a bad alloy."

It occurs as a hydrothermal mineral in silver bearing veins in association with native silver, pyrargyrite, acanthite, stromeyerite, tetrahedrite, allemontite, galena, calcite and baryte.

== See also ==
- Classification of minerals
- List of minerals
