= Safflorite =

Mineral

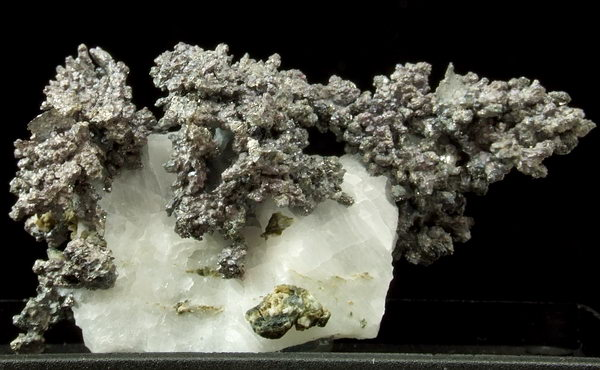
- Safflorite and calcite from Morocco

General
- Category: Arsenide mineral
- Formula: (Co,Fe)As_{2}
- IMA symbol: Saf
- Strunz classification: 2.EB.15a
- Crystal system: Orthorhombic
- Crystal class: Dipyramidal (mmm); H-M symbol: (2/m 2/m 2/m)
- Space group: Pnnm
- Unit cell: a = 5.173 Å, b = 5.954 Å c = 2.999 Å; Z = 2

Identification
- Color: Tin white, tarnishes to gray
- Crystal habit: Prismatic crystals, massive to fibrous
- Twinning: Forms cruciform penetration twins
- Cleavage: Distinct on {100}
- Fracture: Uneven to conchoidal
- Tenacity: Brittle
- Mohs scale hardness: 4.5–5.5
- Luster: Metallic
- Streak: Grayish black
- Diaphaneity: Opaque
- Specific gravity: 6.9–7.3

Safflorite is a rare cobalt iron arsenide mineral with the chemical formula (Co,Fe)As_{2}. Pure safflorite is CoAs_{2}, but iron is virtually always present. Safflorite is a member of the three-way substitution series of arsenides known as the loellingite group. More than fifty percent iron makes the mineral loellingite whereas more than fifty percent nickel and the mineral is rammelsbergite. A parallel series of antimonide minerals exist.

Safflorite along with the other minerals crystallize in the orthorhombic system forming opaque gray to white massive to radiating forms, Clinosafflorite has a monoclinic symmetry. It has a mohs hardness of 4.5 and a specific gravity of 6.9 to 7.3. Twinning is common and star shaped twins are frequently found.

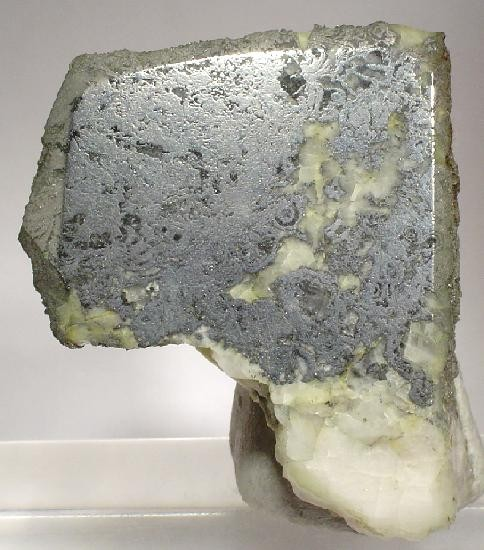
Polished sample of safflorite, loellingite and rammelsbergite on quartz from the St Andreasberg District, Harz Mountains

It was first described in 1835 from the Schneeberg District, Ore Mountains, Germany. Safflorite occurs with other arsenide minerals as an accessory in silver mining districts. It alters to the arsenate erythrite in the secondary environment.
