= Gold chalcogenides =

Class of chemical compound

Gold chalcogenides are compounds formed between gold and one of the chalcogens, elements from group 16 of the periodic table: oxygen, sulfur, selenium, or tellurium.

- Gold(III) oxide, Au_{2}O_{3}. Decomposes into gold and oxygen above 160 °C, and dissolves in concentrated alkalis to form solutions which probably contain the [Au(OH)_{4}]^{−} ion
- Gold(I) sulfide, Au_{2}S. Formed by reaction of hydrogen sulfide with gold(I) compounds.
- Gold(III) sulfide, Au_{2}S_{3}, claimed material but unsubstantiated.
- Gold tellurides: Au_{2}Te_{3}, Au_{3}Te_{5}, and AuTe_{2} (approximate formulas) are known as non-stoichiometric compounds. They show metallic conductivity. Au_{3}Te_{5} is a superconductor at 1.62 K.

Gold telluride minerals, such as calaverite and krennerite (AuTe_{2}), petzite (Ag_{3}AuTe_{2}), and sylvanite (AgAuTe_{2}), are minor ores of gold (and tellurium). See telluride minerals for more information.
