= Robert J. Stern =

American geoscientist based in Texas (born 1951)

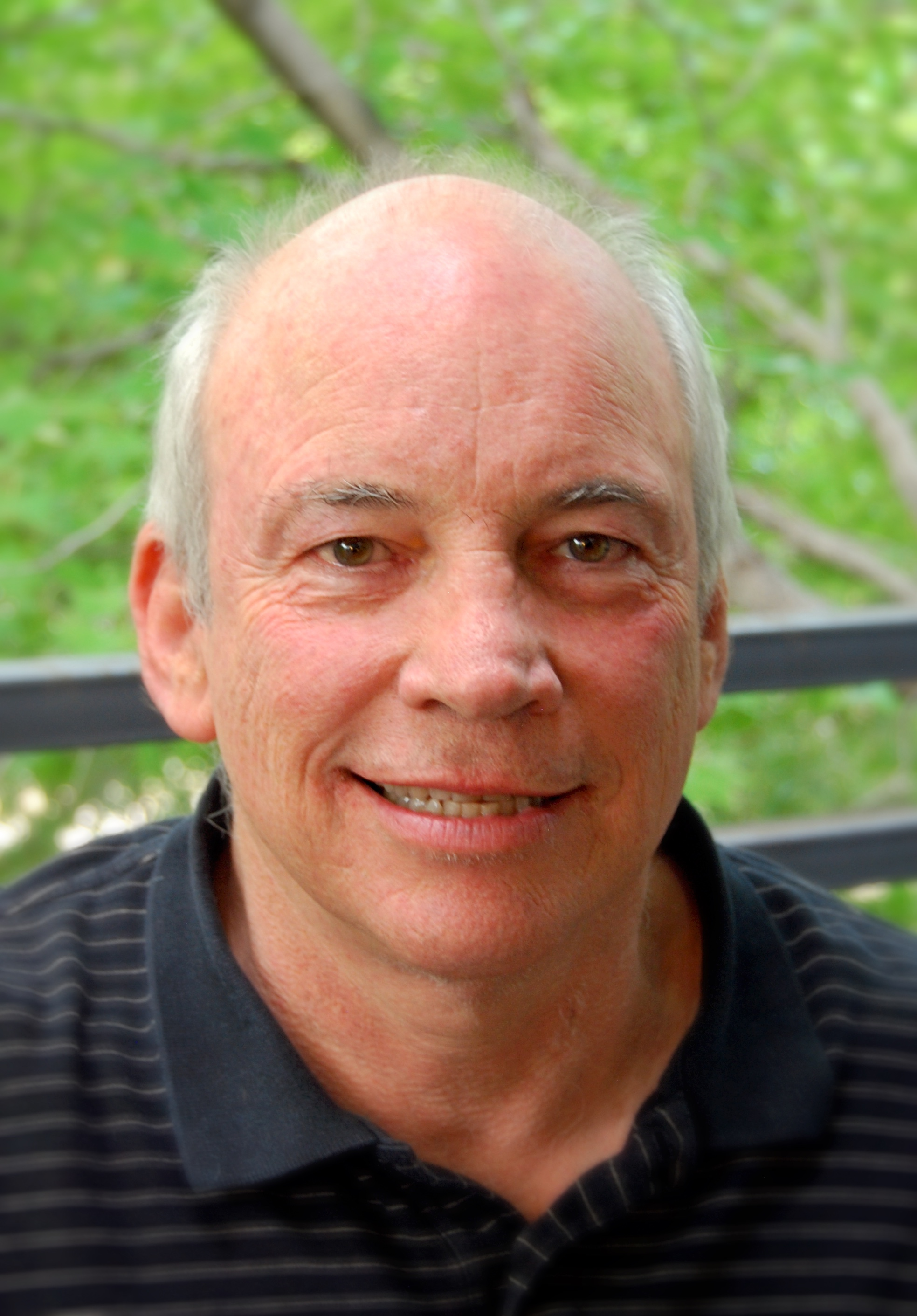
Stern in 2017

Robert James Stern (born February 2, 1951) is an American geoscientist who spent his academic career in Dallas, TX.

== Education ==
Stern went to UC Davis, majoring first in Political Science before dropping out for a year and returning to major in Geology, graduating with honors in 1974. Stern undertook graduate studies at the Scripps Institution of Oceanography, undertaking the first of his many marine geoscientific research cruises, beginning with the EURYDICE cruise in 1975 aboard the R/V Thomas Washington, from Majuro back to San Diego.

In 1976 he made the first of many field trips to study the volcanic rocks of the Mariana island arc. In 1977 Stern began his PhD studies in the Precambrian rocks of the Eastern Desert of Egypt under the supervision of Prof. A.E.J.Engel.

Stern defended his PhD dissertation "Late Precambrian Ensimatic Volcanism in the Central Eastern Desert of Egypt" in Sept. 1979. From Sept. 1979 to January 1982, Stern was a post-doctoral fellow at the Department of Terrestrial Magnetism, Carnegie Institution of Washington, carrying out isotopic studies of Egyptian and Mariana igneous rocks.

== Academic life ==
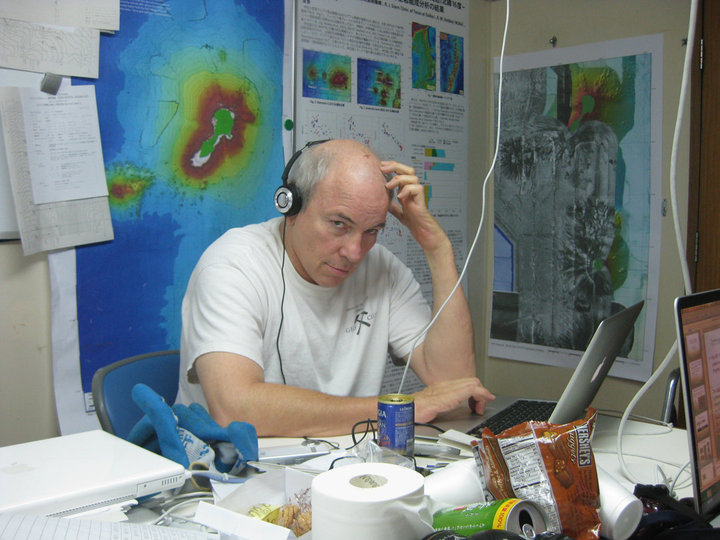
Bob Stern, age 50, at sea in the Western Pacific, 2001

In January 1982, Stern joined the faculty of Programs in Geosciences at the University of Texas at Dallas, rising from assistant professor to professor.

Stern teaches a required undergraduate course in igneous and metamorphic petrology and a required graduate course in tectonics, along with various elective undergraduate and graduate courses. Stern's research concerns include the disciplines of tectonics, igneous geochemistry, isotope geochemistry, and geochronology. Research areas include the Izu-Bonin-Mariana arc system in the Western Pacific, NE Africa and Arabia, Iran, the Gulf of Mexico, and the Permian Basin of Texas and New Mexico. He has carried out field studies in Egypt, Sudan, Ethiopia, Saudi Arabia, Israel, and Jordan. Stern has led or participated in many marine geoscientific expeditions in the Mariana convergent margin, exploring most of the submarine arc volcanoes by dredging and ROV studies; deeper regions in the backarc basin and forearc have been studied by dredging and diving with manned submersible. Topics include studies of subduction, ophiolites, convergent margin tectonics and magmatism, subduction initiation and the evolution of plate tectonics on Earth. Stern served as Geosciences Dept. Head from 1997 through 2005.

Stern was Professor of Geosciences and Director of the Global and Magmatic Research Laboratory at the University of Texas at Dallas University of Texas at Dallas. He has more than 40 years of geoscientific research experience, studying active convergent margin processes and products in the Mariana arc system Izu–Bonin–Mariana Arc in the Western Pacific as well as ancient (900-550 million year old) crust exposed in the Arabian-Nubian Shield of Egypt, Sudan, Ethiopia, Saudi Arabia, Jordan and Israel. Stern is expert on the Geology of the Dallas–Fort Worth Metroplex and the geology of Iran, and has made important contributions to the geology of the Caribbean and the Gulf of Mexico. These studies involve research at sea and on land. Geodynamic contributions include ideas about how new subduction zones form and the evolution of plate tectonics. He and his students and co-authors have published more than 375 peer-reviewed scientific papers.

Stern is also interested in generating educational animations and videos of geoscientific processes. He was head of UTD Geoscience Studios. He shared supervision of the UTD Geosciences Micro-imaging lab with Dr. Ignacio Pujana. He was also co-director of the Permian Basin Research Laboratory. Stern is a Fellow of the Geological Society of America, the American Geophysical Union, and the American Association for the Advancement of Science and is Editor-in-Chief of International Geology Review. In 2015 he was inducted into the Oroville, California Union High School Hall of Fame 2019 he was awarded the International Prize of the Geological Society of Japan. In 2022 he was selected as the UTD Polykarp Kusch Lecturer.

Stern retired from UTD in May 2026. He and his wife Melissa live in Los Angeles where he is a Visiting Researcher at UCLA.
