= Bezsmertnovite =

Telluride mineral

General
- Category: Telluride mineral
- Formula: Au_{4}Cu(Te,Pb) or Au_{4}Cu(Te,Pb),Ме_{5}Х
- IMA symbol: Bez
- Strunz classification: 2.BA.80
- Crystal system: Orthorhombic
- Crystal class: Sulfide

Identification
- Formula mass: 986.7750218 g/mol
- Color: bright yellow, yellow-orange, orange, bronze yellow
- Crystal habit: Massive
- Mohs scale hardness: 4.5
- Luster: sub-metallic
- Streak: golden, yellow, orange
- Diaphaneity: opaque
- Density: 16.3 (calculated)
- Optical properties: anisotropic in neutral gray shades
- Other characteristics: IMA Status Approved (1979)

Bezsmertnovite, less often bessmertnovite (Russian: Безсмертновит) is a very rare supergene mineral of the sulfide class, complex in composition: mixed plumbotelluride of gold, copper, iron, silver from the bilibinskite group with the calculation formula Au_{4}Cu(Te,Pb).

Discovered in 1978 at the Aginskoe gold deposit (Central Kamchatka), bezsmertnovite stands out among all other ore minerals with its unusually high saturation and purity of color (orange-yellow), surpassing even gold. In 1979, the new mineral was named in honor of the married couple of famous Moscow mineralogists: Vladimir and Marianna Bezsmertnaya. The co-authors of the discovery were two Moscow scientists, geologist Ernst Spiridonov and mineralogist Tatiana Chvileva.

== Discovery history and name ==
Aginskoe gold deposit (Central Kamchatka, Bystrinsky District) was discovered in 1964 and was not immediately included in the industrial development plan. As part of prospecting and exploration work carried out from 1973 to 1985, groups of geologists and mineralogists from all over the Soviet Union worked in the area. During research at the deposit, several previously unknown minerals of complex composition were discovered and registered, one of which was a new and unusual in structure plumbotelluride with a very high content of gold, first found in 1978 and the following year received the name bezsmertnovite.

The internationally accepted name of the mineral reproduces the old (Church Slavonic) transcription of the word “bessmertie” (Russian: бессмертие, immortality), which ceased to be a grammatical norm in the 19th century, however, preserved in various linguistic formations of early times. In particular, the spelling “bezsmertie” (Russian: безсмертие) was preserved among the corpus of old Russian surnames, the spelling of which was not updated or in the modern Ukrainian version. It was in this way that the new mineral received an unusual name (unusual even for the Russian language), given to it in honor of a married couple consisting of an authoritative Moscow mineralogist, a leading employee of the IMGRE and a specialist in the field of natural tellurides, Marianna Bezsmertnaya (1915-1991) and her husband, Vladimir Bezsmertny (1912-2002), a specialist in the field of geology of ore deposits. Moreover, it was Marianna Bezsmertnaya who insisted on including her husband’s name in the nomination list of the mineral bezsmertnovite, considering herself part of the family scientific tandem. This was her only request (an important condition) to Tatiana Chvileva and Ernst Spiridonov when nominating the mineral for approval by the commission of the Academy of Sciences and the USSR Ministry of Geology in 1979. Otherwise, she did not give her consent to such a name for the mineral.

At first, visually classified as a natural intermetallic compound of gold, the mineral almost immediately aroused scientific discussions, accompanied by a series of spectral and radiographic studies. In the final version, the mineral was classified as a complex class of plumbotellurides.

Typical samples of bezsmertnovite are in the collection of the Institute of Mineralogy, Geochemistry and Crystal Chemistry of Rare Elements and in the Fersman Mineralogical Museum.

== Properties ==
Bezsmertnovite is a lamellar oblong grain of irregular shape with a size of no more than 0.2 × 0.05 mm. In reflected light and under a microscope, the mineral resembles gold and has a very bright orange-yellow color, although it has a lower reflectance. Anisotropic in neutral gray shades.

A distinctive optical feature of new minerals of the bilibinskite plumbotelluride group, especially bezsmertnovite, is the extremely high saturation and purity of color. Until then, the highest values for this parameter were characterized only by gold, which had an indicator p = 48%, relative to the white light source. However, the similar indicator for bezsmertnovite is significantly higher than gold (p = 62%). The mineral is opaque, has a strong metallic luster and an orange tint, reminiscent of cuprous gold. The extremely high color saturation of bezsmertnovite is determined to be the highest of all known ore minerals.

In reflected light, bezsmertnovite is similar to gold, due to which it is easily detected among aggregates of bilibinskite, bogdanovite and other minerals of the group: it is the lightest of them, has a rich orange-yellow color, and in crossed nicols it is weakly anisotropic in gray tones. The mineral has metallic electrical conductivity.

== Mineral formation ==
External image
- Bezsmertnovite (Trixie Mine, Utah)

Bezsmertnovite was found in a volcanogenic deposit with a predominance of gold tellurides in supergene zones. As a rule, it is found in association with two other minerals of its group: bilibinskite and bogdanovite, occasionally in the form of rims or inclusions in grains of native gold, and is also found with rickardite and other tellurites.

Plumbotellurides and stibioplumbotellurides Au – Cu (Ag) – Fe develop in the weathering crust (in the cementation zone) of gold-telluride deposits. Bilibinskite, bogdanovite and bezsmertnovite contain about 50, 65 and 75 mass percent gold, respectively. Macroscopically they resemble bornite. The hardness of these minerals is noticeably higher than that of native gold. In supergene zones, minerals of the group replace hypogene kostovite, krennerite, sylvanite, nagyágite and altaite. In turn, gold plumbotellurides are not stable in oxidation zones; they are replaced by fine scalloped gold and tellurites Cu, Pb, Fe.

== Occurrence ==
Bezsmertnovite is a very rare mineral that formed in the weathering zones of gold tellurides. The type locality is the Kamchatka Peninsula (Aginskoe gold deposit) in the Russian Far East, where the mineral was discovered in 1978. In the 1990s, bezsmertnovite was found in similar mineralization conditions at several gold-telluride deposits located around the world. The most famous of them: Manka (Kurshim District, East Kazakhstan Region), two deposits in Shandong province (northeast China); Plavica-Zlatica (North Macedonia) and Trixie (Utah). There is also data on the latest finds of bezsmertnovite at the Priozernoye deposit (Northern Urals).

== See also ==
- List of minerals named after people
