= Djerfisherite =

Sulfide mineral

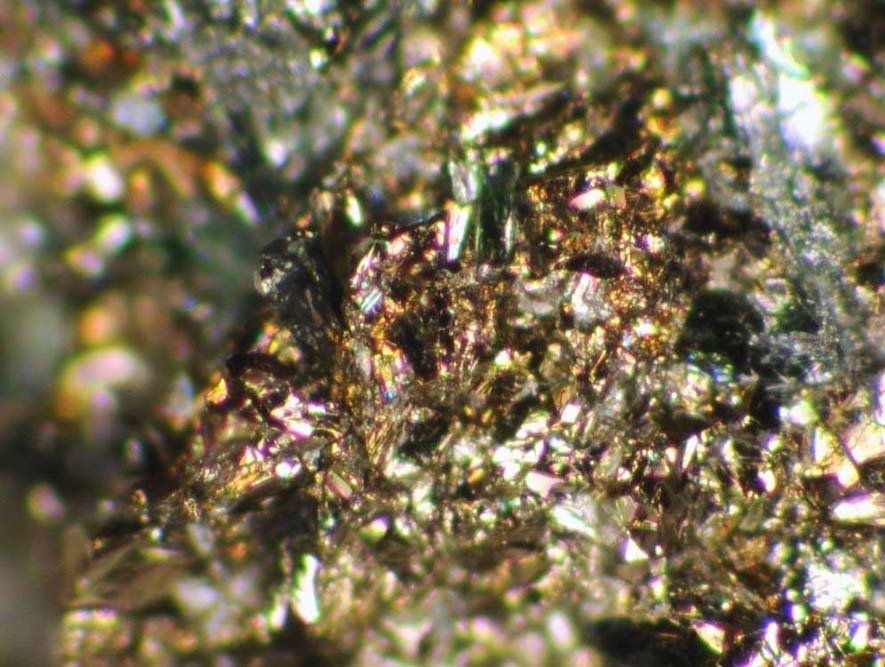
- Djerfisherite found in Russia

General
- Category: Sulfide mineral
- Formula: See text
- IMA symbol: Djr
- Strunz classification: 2.FC.05
- Crystal system: Cubic
- Crystal class: Hexoctahedral (m3̅m); H-M symbol: (4/m 3̅ 2/m)
- Space group: Pm3̅m
- Unit cell: a = 10.465 Å; Z = 1

Identification
- Color: Greenish yellow, khaki to olive drab
- Crystal habit: Rounded grains
- Mohs scale hardness: 3.5
- Luster: Submetallic
- Diaphaneity: Opaque
- Optical properties: Isotropic

Djerfisherite is an alkali copper–iron sulfide mineral and a member of the djerfisherite group.

The chemical composition is somewhat variable. A Russian study from 1979 on djerfisherite from the Kola Peninsula found the formula K_{6}Na(Fe,Cu)_{24}S_{26}Cl, but a study in 2007 of samples from Siberia found no detectable sodium and states that the formula K_{6}(Fe,Cu,Ni)_{25}S_{26}Cl is considered the most appropriate. Both crystallographic studies have 58 atoms per unit cell. Sulfur atoms are in three nonequivalent locations, containing 12, 6, and 8 atoms per unit cell. The later study put a copper atom where the earlier study put a sodium atom. More information on the structure and other questions is available, as well as 3-D models.

The Webmineral "Mineralogy Database" site gives the "chemical formula" as K_{6}Na(Fe^{2+},Cu,Ni)_{25}S_{26}Cl, apparently in error, and an "empirical formula" as K_{6}NaFe^{2+}_{19}Cu_{4}NiS_{26}Cl.

Djerfisherite is one of the rare and unusual minerals in its chemical composition, combining lithophile (K) and chalcophile (Cu,Fe,Ni) elements in its composition. In addition to djerfisherite itself, such minerals also include sodium chvilevaite Na(Cu,Fe,Zn)_{2}S_{2} and murunskite K_{2}Cu_{3}FeS_{3}.

Its type locality is the Kota-Kota meteorite (Marimba meteorite), found in Malawi. It was first described in 1966 and named after professor Daniel Jerome Fisher (1896–1988), University of Chicago. It has been reported from meteorites, copper-nickel hydrothermal deposits, skarn, pegmatite, kimberlites and alkalic intrusive complexes. Associated minerals include kamacite, troilite, schreibersite, clinoenstatite, tridymite, cristobalite, daubreelite, graphite, roedderite, alabandite, talnakhite, pentlandite, chalcopyrite, magnetite, valleriite, sphalerite and platinum minerals.
