= Pavel Pepperstein =

Russian artist and writer (born 1966)

Pavel Pepperstein (né Pivovarov; born in 1966, Moscow, Russia) is a Russian artist and writer.

== Biography ==
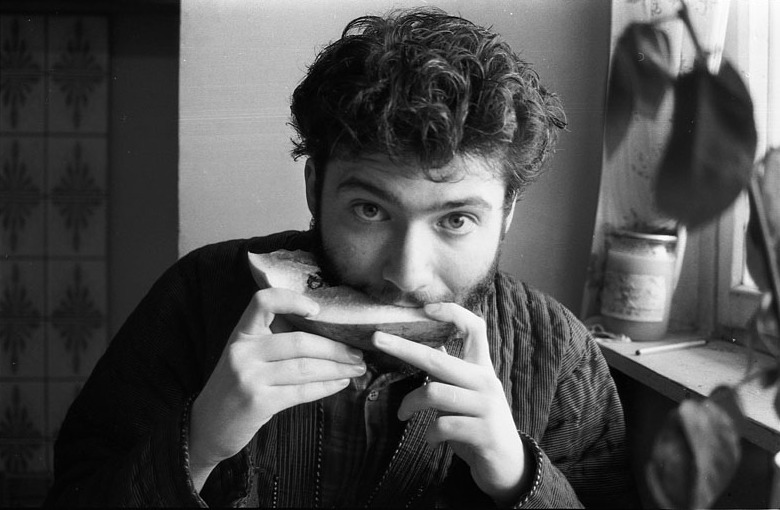
Pavel Pepperstein

Pepperstein was born to Irina Pivovarova, an author of children’s books, and Viktor Pivovarov, a well-known painter. From 1985 to 1987, he studied at The Academy of Fine Arts in Prague. In 1987 he co-founded the experimental group of artists called Inspection Medical Hermeneutics (P.Pepperstein, S. Anufriev, Y.Liederman, V. Fedorov). The ideology of Medical Hermeneutics was the fusion of incompatible descriptive language, from contemporary western philosophy and Orthodox theology, Daoism and Buddhism to the language of psychiatry and pharmacology, which created a completely unique manner of expression.

Since 1989 Pepperstein has been an independent artist, writer, critic, art theorist and rap musician. His work is a continuation of the tradition started by the Moscow Conceptual School. During 1994 he was Visiting Professor at the Städelschule in Frankfurt, Germany.

His exhibitions include the 53rd Venice Biennial in 2009, in the Russian Pavilion, where his installation Landscapes of the Future was widely acclaimed and received numerous positive reviews from critics. Writing about the Venice Biennale in Süddeutsche Zeitung, Nobel laureate Orhan Pamuk said he found consolation in the work of Pepperstein, which reminds him of William Blake. In June 2014, Pepperstein was personally invited by the distinguished German curator Kasper König to appear at Manifesta 10, the European Biennial of Contemporary Art. In October 2014 Pepperstein was invited to take part in a group exhibition Manifest Intention. Drawing in all its forms at Castello di Rivoli Museo d’Arte Contemporanea. The exhibition, curated by Beatrice Merz, was entirely dedicated to the leading practitioners of the art of drawing from the last 100 years. Pepperstein’s work also features prominently in a book on contemporary figurative drawing written by Roger Malbert, a senior curator at Hayward Gallery in London. The book, entitled 'Drawing People' and published by Thames and Hudson in April 2015, focuses on contemporary artists for whom drawing is a primary means of expression and who focus on the human subject.

Roger Malbert writes, "Word and image flow from the same pen with a facility and grace that appear peculiarly timeless in the work of Pavel Pepperstein. His drawings hark back to a pre-technological age when handwriting was cultivated as the primary expression of the self, and great illustrators such as Saul Steinberg could invoke a multiplicity of styles with a few lines. In Pepperstein's universe political allegory is couched in the symbolic language of Russian Suprematism of the early twentieth century, an avant-garde so far ahead of its time that a century after its manifestation it still appears to foresee a future at which we may never arrive. Paradoxically, for a figurative artist like Pepperstein, with one foot in children's book illustration and the other in political cartoons, it is Malevich's Black Square (1915), the absolute negation of figurative imagery, that heralds the new order. This would be the mystical 'end of history', when all conflicts are resolved, gangsters no longer rule the roost and justice prevails".

Echoing the attention Malbert pays to word and image in Pepperstein's art, Boris Groys states in After the Big Tsimtsum, "Pavel Pepperstein is quite clearly more than just an artist. He is also a poet, writer, critic, curator and theorist. Above all, however, he is a designer of social spaces". The curator Hans Ulrich Obrist calls Pepperstein "one of the most important contemporary artists".

And the critic Filipa Ramos has said of Pepperstein, “In his vast body of work, the artist has explored the possibilities of combining linguistics, outlandish experiments, popular narratives, and science fiction in a way that seems to be immune to the ideals and expressive forms of post-perestroika”.

Pepperstein’s art has been exhibited in museums and galleries around the world, including The Louvre in Paris. His paintings, drawings and installations can be found in the Tretyakov State Gallery in Moscow, the Russian State Museum in St Petersburg, the George Pompidou Centre in Paris, the Deutsche Bank Collection and in many public and private collections both in Russia and abroad.

In December 2014, Pepperstein was awarded the Kandinsky Prize, Russia's premier contemporary art award. Pepperstein is a somewhat mythical figure. An intensely private man, he rarely appears in public and has no permanent address or studio, preferring instead an anchoritic lifestyle and nomadic existence.

Pepperstein is also a prominent writer of fiction, known for his wild imagination and unique sense of humour. His magnum opus is «The Mythogenic Love of Castes» (Vol. 1, published in 1999, written in collaboration with Sergei Anufriev, Vol. 2, published in 2002, written by Pepperstein alone), a large-scale psychedelic novel in which the Great Patriotic War is shown through the eyes of permanently hallucinating party organizer Vladimir Dunayev (some of the creations that he encounters in his delirium evidently resemble Mary Poppins, Vinnie the Pooh, Baba Yaga and other characters from children books and folk tales). Pepperstein also published several collections of surrealistic fantasy short stories, including critically acclaimed «War Stories» (2006) and «Spring» (2010).

== Selected solo exhibitions ==
- 1995 - Project No.3 and Freudian Dreams (with Andrei Monastyrski). Galerie Pastzi-Bott. Cologne, Germany.
- 1995 - A Game of Tennis (with Ilya Kabakov). Art Gallery of Ontario. Toronto, Canada
- 1996 - A Game of Tennis (with Ilya Kabakov). Pori Art Museum, Pori, Finland
- 1997 - Portrait of an Old Man. State Russian Museum. St. Petersburg, Russia
- 1998 - Binoculars and Monoculars. Life and work, Kunsthaus Zug, Switzerland
- 1998 - The Sweet Dark. Obscuri Viri Gallery, Moscow
- 1999 - Drawings. Akademie Schloss Solitude, Stuttgart
- 1999 - New drawings. Elisabeth Kaufmann, Basel
- 1999 - The Father and the Son (with Viktor Pivovarov). Kunsthaus Zug. Zug, Swithzerland
- 2000 - Away from the Labyrinth (with Greenman). Museum of Israel, Jerusalem
- 2000 - Russian Novel 2000. Regina Gallery, Moscow
- 2000 - Moses. Kunsthaus Zug, Switzerland
- 2000 - Things are in a Landscape (with Victor Pivovarov). Obscuri Viri, Moscow
- 2000 - How to meet an Angel (with Ilya Kabakov). Sprovieri Gallery, London
- 2000 - Two Agents (with Victor Pivovarov). Karmelienkloster, Graz, Austria
- 2000 - Two Agents (with Victor Pivovarov). Kulturzentrum bei den Minoriten, Graz, Austria
- 2001 - Exhibition of One Talk (with Ilya Kabakov and Boris Groys). Kunsthaus Zug, Zug, Switzerland
- 2001 - The Girl and the Tunnel. Elisabeth Kaufmann, Zürich
- 2001 - Zeichnungen. Galerie Romain Larivière, Paris
- 2002 - Traum und Museum. Kunsthaus Zug, Zug, Switzerland
- 2002 - Political hallucinations. Galerie Kamm, Berlin
- 2002 - Gods and Monsters. Neuer Aachener Kunstverein, Aachen, Germany
- 2002 - America. Galerie Ursula Walbrol, Düsseldorf, Germany
- 2003 - Flags & Flowers. Sutton Lane, London
- 2003 - Battles. Regina Gallery, Moscow
- 2004 - Hypnosis. Sprovieri Gallery, London, UK
- 2004 - Hypnosis. Regina Gallery, Moscow
- 2004 - Hypnosis. Galerie Elisabeth Kaufmann, Zurich
- 2004 - Eyes, little sister is watching you…Galerie Kamm, Berlin
- 2004 - Dreams, Music and Money. Galerie Iragui, Paris
- 2005 - Europa. Galerie Ursula Walbroel, Düsseldorf
- 2005 - Drawings. Artplay Gallery, Moscow
- 2005 - Riders on the Storm. Ministry of Culture, Düsseldorf
- 2005 - Riders on the Storm. Sutton Lane Gallery, London
- 2006 - Landscapes of the Future. Gallerie Kamm, Berlin
- 2006 - Pentagon. Regina Gallery, Moscow, Russia
- 2006 - Drawings. Kunstmuseum, Cabinet d’art Graphique, Basel
- 2007 - Rembrandt. Dmitriy Semenov Gallery, St Petersburg
- 2007 - City of Russia. Regina Gallery, Moscow
- 2007 - Landscapes of the Future. Gallery of Modern Art, Vancouver
- 2007 - Talking Animals. Kaufmann Gallery, Zurich, Switzerland
- 2008 - Either/Or: National Suprematism as a Project for a New Representative Style for Russia. Regina Gallery. Moscow, Russia
- 2008 - Objects Above The Sea. Sutton Lane Gallery, London
- 2009 - A Suprematist Study of Ancient Greek Myths. Galerie Kamm, Berlin
- 2009 - Either-Or: National Suprematism. Kewenig Galerie, Cologne
- 2010 - From Mordor With Love. Regina Gallery, London
- 2010 - Vesna. Artberloga Gallery, Moscow
- 2011 - Leviathan. Campoli Presti Gallery, Paris
- 2011 - Landscapes of the Future. Kewenig Galerie, Cologne
- 2012 - Ophelia. Regina Gallery, London
- 2013 - Studies of American Suprematism. Galerie Kamm, Berlin
- 2013 - Murder, She said! Galería Kewenig, Palma de Mallorca
- 2014 - Debris of the Future. Pace Gallery, London
- 2014 - Holy Politics. Regina Gallery, Moscow
- 2015 - The Future enamoured with the Past. Multimedia Art Museum, Moscow
- 2015 - The Cold Centre of the Sun. Museum of Modern and Contemporary Art, Saint-Étienne
- 2016 - Hunters of the marble heads. The Russian Academy of Fine Arts Museum, St Petersburg
- 2016 - Abstract Memories. Kewenig Galerie, Berlin
- 2017 - The resurrection of Pablo Picasso in the year 3111. Kunsthaus Zug, Switzerland
- 2017 - The secret drawings of Jacqueline Kennedy. The Art Show, Art Dealers Association of America, New York

== Group exhibitions ==
1991

- ART BOOK. Riga, Latvia
- MANI Museum – 40 Moscow artists. Karmelitenkloster. Frankfurt am Main
- Private employments. 1.0 Gallery, Moscow
- Mamka-space. Sadovniki Gallery, Moscow

1992

- A Mosca…a Mosca. Galleria d’Arte Moderna, Bologna, Italy
- Perspective of Conceptualism. North Carolina Museum of Art, USA
- Monuments: transformation for the future. ISI Central House of Artists, Moscow

1993

- Temporal address of Russian Art. Musée de la Post, Paris
- Monuments: transformation for the future. ICA, New York
- Step East. 45th Venice Biennale, Venice
- Context Kunst 90. Kunstlerhaus Graz, Graz, Austria

1994

- Victory and Defeat. Obscuri Viri, Moscow
- 2nd Cetin Biennale of Modern Art, Cetin, Montenegro
- Architecture of ideas. Kunsthaus Hamburg, Hamburg

1995

- History Personalized: Contemporary Russian Art, 1956-1996. A touring exhibition of the Russian provinces organized by the Open society Institute with the Tsaritsino State Museum-Reserve, Nizhny Novgorod; Samara; Novosibirsk; Perm; Ekaterinburg
- Nonconformist Art from the Soviet Union. Collection of Tsaritsino State Museum-Reserve, Mucharnok Museum of Fine Arts, Budapest
- In Moskau…In Moscau. Badischer Kunsverein, Karlsruhe
- About Beauty. Regina Gallery, Moscow
- Dry Water. Bakhchisaray museum-preserve, Bakhchisaray, Crimea
- How to Draw a Horse (Part 1). Ipodrom, Moscow
- View on Paris from the new building window. Obscuri Viri, Moscow
- Kunst im verborgenen. Nonkomformisten Russland 1957-1995. Wilchelm-Hack Museum, Ludwigshafen, Germany; Documenta-Halle. Kassel, Germany; Staatliches Lindenau Museum, Altenburg, Germany

1996

- How to Draw a Horse (Part 2). Central House of Artists, Moscow
- Scopes of Interpretations. Russian State Humanitarian University, Moscow

1997

- Drawing 3, Pavel Pepperstein and Max Matter. Elisabeth Kaufmann Gallery, Basel
- Mystical Correct. Galerie Hohenthal and Bergen, Berlin
- Ecology of Emptiness. Centre of Modern Art, Moscow

1998

- Eurorepair. Slavianski Cultural and Historical Centre, Moscow

1999

- Crazy Twin. Touring exhibition organized by the Society of Collectors of Contemporary Art, Moscow with Appolonia-European Artistic Interchanges (Strasburg). Various locations: Moscow; Nizhny Novgorod; Samara; Ekaterinburg; Uaron Castle (France)

2000

- Neues Moskau. Ifa-Galerie, Berlin

2001

- Die Ausstellung eines Gesprächs (Projekt Sammlung 4); Groys, Kabakov und Pepperstein. Kunsthaus Zug, Switzerland
- The Body Art. Biennale de Valencia, Valencia, Spain

2002

- Contemporary Russian Painting 1992–2002. New Manezh, Moscow

2003

- Moscow Conceptualists. Kupferstichkabinett Berlin
- Berlin – Moscow. Martin-Gropius-Bau, Berlin
- Korrekturen. Galerie Kamm, Berlin
- Neue Ansätze – Zeitgenössische Kunst aus Moscow. Kunsthalle Düsseldorf

2004

- 26th Sao-Paulo Biennale, Ciccillio Matarazzo Pavilion. Sao-Paulo, Brazil
- Moscow-Berlin 1950-2000. Central Historical Museum, Moscow
- Go, Russia, Go. Regina Gallery, Moscow

2005

- Angels of History – Moscow Conceptualism and its influence. MuHKA Museum voor Hedendaagse Kunst Antwerpen, Antwerp
- Essence of Life – Essence of Art. Ludwig Museum – Museum of Contemporary Art, Budapest
- Ansichten. Galerie Ute Parduhn, Düsseldorf
- Russia society, since 1997. First Moscow Biennale of Contemporary Art, Moscow
- Third Triennial of Contemporary Art Oberschwaben. Weingart, Germany
- Contrabandistas de imagines. Museo de arte contemporaneo de la Universidad de Chile, Santiago de Chile

2006

- Essence of Life – Essence of Art. State Russian Museum, St. Petersburg

2007

- Woe from Wit. Vera Pogodina Gallery, Moscow
- Moscopolis. Espace Louis Vuitton, Paris
- Intellectual Realism. Project for 2nd Moscow Biennale, Tretyakov Gallery, Moscow
- Bird Watching. Galerie De Vishal, Haarlem, Netherlands
- Pavel Pepperstein + Arkady Nasonov: My future movies. Galerie Tanya Rumpff, Haarlem, Netherlands
- Cultural Confusion: Pavel Pepperstein, Yesim Akdeniz Graf, Hadassah Emmerich. Elisabeth Kaufmann Gallery, Zurich

2008

- Total Enlightenment – Moscow Conceptual Art 1960 – 1990. Schirn Kunsthalle, Frankfurt
- Anatomie-les peaux du dessin collection. Florence et Damiel Guerlain, Frac Picardie, Amiens
- U-Turn. Quadrennial for Contemporary Art, Copenhagen

2009

- Victory over the Future. 53rd Venice Biennale (Russian Pavilion), Venice
- Making Worlds. curated by Daniel Birnbaum, 53rd Venice Biennale, Venice
- Political Comics. Kunstverein Hamburg, Hamburg
- Political Comics. 3rd Moscow Biennale of Contemporary Art, Moscow
- European Drawings. Oredaria Arti Contemporanee Gallery, Rome

2010

- Contrepoint: Russian Contemporary Art, From the Icon to the Avant-garde. Musée du Louvre, Paris
- The Beijing International Art Biennale. curated by Roger Gustafsson, Beijing
- The More I Draw, Drawing as a Concept for the World. Museum für Gegenwartskunst Siegen, Germany
- Les Utopies Mutantes. Passage de Retz, Paris
- Diary of a Madman. Regina Gallery, Moscow

2011

- The Global Contemporary. ZKM | Center for Art and Media, Karlsruhe
- Ostalgia. The New Museum, New York
- Modernikon. Contemporary Art from Russia, 54th Venice Biennale, Venice

2012

- Text-Bild-Konzepte. Stadt Mannheim Kunsthalle, Mannheim

2013

- Florence and Daniel Guerlain Donation. Centre Pompidou, Paris, France
- Bergen Assembly. Triennial, Bergen, Norway
- Flow. 6th Prague Biennale, Prague
- The Politics of Play. Gothenburg Biennale, Sweden

2014

- Manifesta 10, European Biennial of Contemporary Art. State Hermitage Museum, St. Petersburg, Russia
- Father, Can’t You See I’m Burning? de Appel arts centre, Amsterdam, the Netherlands

2015

- Between the Pessimism of the Intellect and the Optimism of the Will. 5th Thessaloniki Biennial of Contemporary Art, the State Museum of Contemporary Art, Greece
- Walk the Line-Neue Wege der Zeichnung. Kunstmuseum Wolfsburg, Germany
- Outer Space. Der Weltraum zwischen Kunst und issenschaft, Bundeskunsthalle, Bonn, Germany
- Artists for Paris Climate 2015. Presentation of the sculpture “Flying Shell” at Charles de Gaulle airport
- Contemporary Drawing Prize 2015. Daniel & Florence Guerlain Contemporary Art Foundation, Paris

2016

- Museum (Science) Fictions. Centre Pompidou, Paris
- Russian Cosmos. Multimedia Art Museum, Moscow

2017

- Triennial of Russian Contemporary Art. Garage Museum, Moscow

== Books ==
- 1999. The Mythological Love of Castes (Vol.1) with Sergei Anufriev — М.: Ad Marginem, 1999. — 480 pp. — ISBN 5-93321-033-1. (RUS)
- 2002. The Mythological Love of Castes (Vol.2)— М.: Ad Marginem, 2002. — 544 pp. — ISBN 5-93321-042-0. (RUS)
- 2006. Svastika | Pentagon — М.: Ad Marginem, 2006. — 190 pp. — ISBN 5-91103-003-9. (RUS)
- 2006. War Stories — М.: Ad Marginem, 2006. — 286 pp. — ISBN 5-91103-001-2. (RUS)
- 2010. Spring — М.: Ad Marginem, 2010. — 480 pp. — ISBN 978-5-91103-072-8. (RUS)
- 2012. A Prague Night — СПб.: Амфора. ТИД Амфора: М.: Ad Marginem Press, 2011. — 208 pp. — ISBN 978-5-367-02089-2 (Амфора). ISBN 978-5-91103-091-9 (Ad Marginem Press). (RUS)
- 2014. A Prague Night (translated by Andrew Bromfield). Artwords Press, 2014. ISBN 978-1906441-30-2 (ENG)
