= Evgeny Semyonov =

Russian conceprual artist

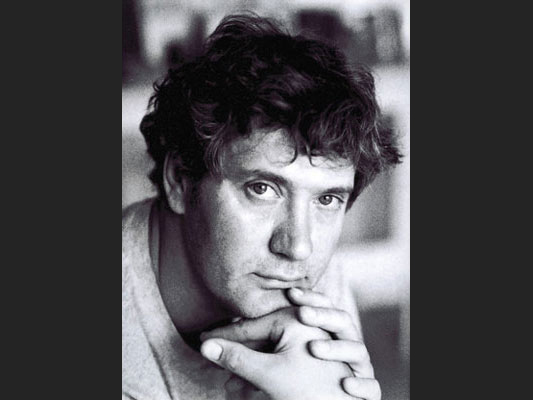
- Born: July 3, 1960 (63 years old); Pervouralsk, Sverdlovsk region, USSR
- Education: Moscow Central Art School at the Russian Academy of Arts; The Gerasimov Institute of Cinematography (VGIK) Film Direction Department
- Style: Conceptual artist
- Awards: Gold Medal Achievement Award from the Russian Academy of Arts
- Website: http://e-semyonov.ru

Evgeny Semyonov (born July 3, 1960, in Pervouralsk, Sverdlovsk region) is a Russian conceptual artist, art theorist, and art collector. Member of the Moscow Conceptualist movement. Honorary Academician of the Russian Academy of Arts. Resident of Kultur Kontakt Austria. (1994–1995). Kandinsky Prize nominee (Project of the Year nomination, 2010) and winner of the Kuzma Petrov-Vodkin Award in contemporary fine art category. Evgeny Semyonov received the Gold Medal Achievement Award from the Russian Academy of Arts in 2021 and was listed as one of the top 50 and top 40 most expensive contemporary Russian artists (The Art Newspaper Russia 2014, 2015, 2021, 2025).

== Biography ==
Evgeny Semyonov was born in Pervouralsk, Sverdlovsk region, in 1960 and started art school in 1968. A young and talented student, he was fascinated by sculpture and sent some of his first art works to the admissions at the Moscow Central Art School at the Russian Academy of Arts (previously called the Moscow Academic Art Lyceum of the Russian Academy of Arts). In 1972, his family decided to move to Moscow to allow the young artist to continue his professional education. A year later, Evgeny became a student of the Sculpture Department at the Moscow Central Art School at the Russian Academy of Arts. Shortly thereafter he transferred to the Painting Department, which he graduated in 1978. It is at the Moscow Central Art School that he met and befriended the offsprings of famous cultural figures, visited their homes, and was exposed to a refined cultural scene that was not mainstream at the time.

The artist created his first conceptual works in the mid-1980s. At the same time, he frequented exhibitions of underground art, where he met trailblazing artists, musicians, and art critics including Vitaly Komar and Alexander Melamid, Dmitry Plavinsky, Alexander Kharitonov, and others. The year 1991 marks the start of the artist's collaboration with The Stuart Levy Gallery in New York with his first solo exhibition. In 1992, upon his return to Moscow, Semyonov begins working on the Domino series and embarks on his first experiences in art criticism and collecting. In 1993, his works are included in the "Postmodernism and National Traditions" exhibition at the State Tretyakov Gallery. Semyonov writes a chapter entitled "Two Exhibitions" for Charles Jenks's book "Post-Soviet Art And Architecture". He develops a keen interest in Austrian art and travels to Austria. In 1994—1995 during his KulturKontakt residence in Vienna, Semyonov works together with the Medical Hermeneutics art group and presents "Seasons". In 1995—1996 the artist continues working on "Living Mathematics".

In 1996 the artist is working in France, Germany, Belgium, and the Netherlands. In 1996—1998 this period marks the start of Semyonov's collaboration with the Guelman Gallery. He is working on "Biblical Scenes", and exhibits his art works at the ART-MOSCOW international fair. in 1999-2000 Semyonov's works are showcased in Marat Guelman's "The Future Is Now", "Dynamic Pairs" and in "Art Against Geography" large-scale exhibition at the Marble Palace, the State Russian Museum, to mark the 10th anniversary of the Guelman Gallery. The accompanying book includes an article "Waiting for the Great Down. The Edge of Consciousness. Evgeny Semenov" by Vyacheslav Kuritsyn. The Russian Museum purchases Semyonov's works for its permanent collection.

In 2001 Semyonov's "Return To Forever", a project created in collaboration with art critic Alexey Rastorguev, is presented at the ART-MOSCOW international fair. The works are now in the permanent collection of the State Tretyakov Gallery. In 2001—2006 Semyonov turns his attention to collecting and assembles a collection of contemporary and antique art. In 2003—2005 Together with actor Sergey Kolesnikov, Semyonov starts a band called Habitus, which releases a number of music albums. In 2009 collaborates with Ekaterina Iragui's gallery. In 2010 Semyonov's "Living Mathematics" is nominated for the Kandinsky Prize. Wich 2011 Starts working with the Krokin Gallery and takes part in group shows. In 2020 becomes the chief curator of the "ART Workshop XXI" The All-Russian Forum of Youth Creative Workshops at the Russian Academy of Arts and leads a creative workshop himself.

== Work ==
As one of the Moscow Conceptualists, Evgeny Semyonov continued the discourse started by the Moscow Romantic Conceptualism movement in the late 1960s. He created his first art works in the early 1980s. In the wider context of contemporary art, his name is associated with Psychedelic Realism. Semyonov's works are listed in art sales at Bonham's, Sotheby's, and Phillips de Pury.

His works are featured in the permanent collections of many museums around the globe including:

- The State Tretyakov Gallery (Moscow, Russia)
- The State Russian Museum (Saint Petersburg, Russia)
- The National Center for Contemporary Art (NCCA, Moscow, Russia)
- The Pushkin State Museum of Fine Arts (Moscow)
- The Perm Museum of Contemporary Art (Perm, Russia)
- The Metropolitan Museum of Art (New York, USA)
- The Norton and Nancy Dodge Collection, Rutgers University (New Brunswick, New Jersey, USA)
- The Museum of Applied Arts (Vienna, Austria).

== Exhibitions ==
=== Selected solo exhibitions ===
- 1991 AB (in collaboration with M. Dzhoute). The Stuart Levy Gallery, New York
- 1994 Seasons. Raum Aktueller Kunst, Vienna
- 1997 Us and Other Comic Books. The Central House of Artists, Moscow
- 1998 Seven Biblical Scenes. Gelman Gallery, Moscow
- 2000 Apocalypse Now. Gelman Gallery, Moscow
- 2009 Living Mathematics. Iragui Gallery, Москва
- 2009 The Dictatorship of Form or the Right Views. VP STUDIO Vera Pogodina Gallery, Moscow
- 2011 My Privacy. NCCA's, Moscow
- 2011 Recycling Church. ERA Foundation, Moscow
- 2012 Hidden Artists. Heroes' Dreams. Krokin Gallery, Moscow

=== Group exhibitions ===
- 1988 «Red and White. East Waze». Warsaw, Amsterdem Artists from all Soviet Republics. Central Exhibition Hall — Manege, Moscow
- 1990 Soviet Avante-Garde 1920—1980. Minsk, Belarus
- 1990 International Artists Exhibition. Valga, Tallinn, Estonia
- 1988—1991 Soviet Avante-Garde 1980. Aix-en-Provence, Lille, France
- 1990—1991 Pyramid. Soviet Art in Australia. Melbourne, Adelaide, Australia
- 1993 Postmodernism and National Traditions. The State Tretyakov Gallery, Moscow
- 1995 KulturKontakt residents' group show. Vienna, Austria
- 1998 ART-MOSCOW. New Manege, Moscow
- 1998—1999 Russia without Modern Art Museum. Kulturabteilang Bayer, Leverkuzen, Germany
- 1999 The Future Is Now, the Guelman Gallery.
- 2000 Searching for a Lost Icon. Museum of Nonconformist Art, St. Petersburg
- 2000 Dynamic Pairs. Marat Guelman's show, Manege Central Exhibition Hall, Moscow
- 2000 Art Against Geography. The Marble Palace, the State Russian Museum, St. Petersburg
- 2000 Iskusstwo 2000. Kunstviren Rosenhein, Germany
- 2002 ART-MOSCOW. The Central House of Artists, Moscow
- 2008 The Frozen Bear. Kunsthal, Helder, The Netherlands
- 2009 Russian Lytrism. The Central House of Artists, Moscow
- 2009 A Frozen Bear or a Russian Story as a Global Puzzle. Kunsthal Den Helder, Netherlands
- 2009 The Suburbs. Moscow Biennale of Contemporary Art, Moscow
- 2009 Art about Art. The State Russian Museum, St. Petersburg
- 2010 Art Therapy. The State Tretyakov Gallery, Moscow
- 2011 Gates and Doors. The State Russian Museum, St. Petersburg
- 2012 New Arrivals. The State Russian Museum, St. Petersburg
- 2012 Icons. Perm Museum of Contemporary Art, Perm
- 2012 Still Life — Metamorphoses. The State Tretyakov Gallery, Moscow
- 2012 Embellishing the Beautiful. Elitism and Kitsch in Contemporary Art. The State Tretyakov Gallery, Moscow
- 2013 Born to fly And Crawl. The State Russian Museum, St. Petersburg
- 2015 Cartoon-Like. London, UK. Works on "Ode to Joy (Angry Birds are Here)" and presents selected works from the series in a "Cartoon-Like" group show and auction of contemporary Russian art in London.
- 2015 Reverse Point Asia. The special projects program of the 6th Moscow International Biennale of Contemporary Art, The Tsaritsyno Museum-Reserve, Moscow. Project "Museum Of Artistic Biology".
- 2017 EVOLUTION/REVOLUTION/REVISION. The parallel program of the 7th Moscow International Biennale of Contemporary Art, The Tsaritsyno Museum-Reserve, Moscow
- 2018 Non-Stencil Printing. Moscow Silkscreen Studio. NCCA Arsenal, Nizhny Novgorod
- 2019 Sciarsism And Sciarsists. The Ludwig Museum, The State Russian Museum, St. Petersburg. The exhibition also toured Belgium, Germany, Italy, and the USA.
- 2021 The Language of Animation: Contemporary Russian Art. The Marble Palace, The State Russian Museum, St. Petersburg. His "Church of Recycling" and "The Meeting of Two Sculptures or Lenin and Giacometti" (2018, an allusion to the sculpture by L.Sokova).
