= Gold(III) acetate =

Names
- Other names: Auric acetate

Identifiers
CAS Number	15804-32-7
3D model (JSmol)	Interactive image
ChemSpider	11278961
PubChem CID	15952561
CompTox Dashboard (EPA)	DTXSID70580364
- InChI: InChI=1S/3C2H4O2.Au/c3*1-2(3)4;/h3*1H3,(H,3,4);/q;;;+3/p-3 Key: OTCKNHQTLOBDDD-UHFFFAOYSA-K
- SMILES: CC(=O)[O-].CC(=O)[O-].CC(=O)[O-].[Au+3]

Properties
Chemical formula	Au(CH_{3}COO)_{3}
Molar mass	374.10 g/mol
Appearance	Yellow solid
Melting point	170 °C (338 °F; 443 K) (decomposes)
Solubility in water	Slightly soluble
Solubility	Slightly soluble in alkaline solutions

Hazards
NFPA 704 (fire diamond)	0 1 0
- Except where otherwise noted, data are given for materials in their standard state (at 25 °C [77 °F], 100 kPa). Infobox references

Gold(III) acetate, also known as auric acetate, is a chemical compound of gold and acetic acid. It is a yellow solid that decomposes at 170 °C to gold metal. This decomposition of gold(III) acetate has been studied as a pathway to produce gold nanoparticles as catalysts.

== Production and reactions ==
Gold(III) acetate can be produced by the reaction of gold(III) hydroxide and glacial acetic acid:

Au(OH)_{3} + 3CH_{3}COOH → Au(CH_{3}COO)_{3} + 3H_{2}O

It reacts with 2-(p-tolyl)pyridine (tpy) in presence of trifluoroacetic acid to form Au(CF_{3}COO)_{2}(tpy).

Gold(III) sulfide has been claimed as the product when gold(III) acetate is sonicated with cyclo-octasulfur in decalin.
