= Inspection Medical Hermeneutics =

Inspection Medical Hermeneutics (Инспекция Медицинская Герменевтика) was a pioneering artists’ collective formed in December 1987 in a squat in Furman Lane in Moscow.

== History ==
The founding members of the group were Pavel Pepperstein, Sergei Anufriev, and Yuri Leiderman. An associate of the group, the journalist Anton Nosik, originally coined the phrase 'Medical Hermeneutics'. According to the OED, hermeneutics is the branch of knowledge that deals with interpretation, especially of the bible or literary texts. The group created installations and performances which experimented with language and meaning, imagining their work as an investigation of their culture at a time when Glasnost was opening it up to the West. They described Glasnost as a moment when ‘the sky opened up’, akin to psychedelic experience, when a rupture between systems brings anxiety as well as the promise of renewal. Their work drew from Russian traditions and fairy tales – often relating these to objects from Western visual culture – as well as psychedelia and pseudo-scientific methodology. Asked to explain the term Medical Hermeneutics, Sergei Anufriev answered: “The essence of it is the following: a collective mindset constantly directs consciousness into the outer regions - ideology, criticism, back to ideology. This creeping development is not an evolution but rather a kind of disease, that is, something that should be treated. The therapy may reveal things not related to the stated issues, a bit like a spill-over”. In Pepperstein’s words, Inspection Medical Hermeneutics produced ‘a thick mumble, white noise and other incomprehensible, unclear things’.

In his book on Moscow Conceptualism, Professor Matthew Jesse Jackson writes, “Uniting, according to Pepperstein, the camaraderie of John Landis’s Blues Brothers and the method of Deleuze and Guattari’s Anti-Oedipus, the inspection combined western mass culture with the rigorous analysis of collective actions, styling itself as an alternative monitoring agency, a quasi-institutional entity designed to resist the recent invasion of foreign “experts”. Soon the group set up its own inspection team to visit artists' studios and other locales around Moscow (and the Soviet Union). Employing a variation on the five-point grading mechanism of the Soviet educational system (dubbed the Higher Evaluative Category), the Med-Hermeneuts juxtaposed their childish grading to the supposedly learned opinions of Western ‘specialists’ “.

He continues: “A typical undertaking occurred in May 1988 at a presentation in which Pepperstein encouraged members of a Moscow audience to don a stethoscope to listen to the beating heart of an infant depicted on an empty box of Soviet baby-food. Such actions synthesised the absurd, therapeutic and analytical motivations of the inspection”.

In 1991 Yuri Leiderman left the group, and Vladimir Fedorov joined.

In 1998 the XI issue of the influential Russian art journal Mesto Pechati was dedicated to the tenth anniversary of Inspection Medical Hermeneutics.

The group officially ceased to exist on September 11, 2001, the day of the terrorist atrocity in New York.

== Notable installations ==
=== Klinger's Boxes ===
Klinger’s Boxes Cold Reduction was first exhibited at Galerie Grita Insam in Vienna in 1991. The installation comprises seven wooden boxes each with its own fantastical drawing by Pepperstein under a glass cover. From each box hangs a pair of woollen mittens. The eccentric and erotic drawings are copies of a series by the turn-of-the- century German artist Max Klinger, which all focus on the motif of the glove. Pavel Pepperstein described the idea behind the work thus:

"The series Klinger’s Boxes is dedicated to the theme of Russia as a memory of Europe.

Russia is a northern country with a cold climate and this prevents things from quick degradation and decay. Therefore, traditional forms of European thought and orientation, now forgotten in Europe, have been preserved in Russia. Some elements of traditional Russian winter clothing act as the keepers of European memory. Elements of bourgeois and dated European culture are warmed up by typical Russian objects connected with cold.

These objects, such as felt boots, woollen mittens, hats with ear-flaps, downy (fluffy) shawls, which were elements of the basic peasant’s clothing, are still very much ‘alive’ and being worn to this day. Some objects have even become fashionable.

The installation’s idea is linked to the development of ideas and aesthetic practices related to the cold, freezing and warming. We explored the basic differences between Russian culture and other cultures in respect of how other cultures look at death. Russia’s cold climate makes the figure of a man dying from freezing cold a very important theme in Russian culture (in Russian fairy tales, in coachman’s songs, in poems by Nikolay Nekrasov ‘Grandfather Frost-Red Nose’ and so on ... ).

Death by freezing is one of the most blissful forms of dying. A person dying from freezing does not feel pain; he experiences euphoria and pleasant hallucinations. This characterises a more painless attitude towards death in Russian culture in comparison with the European culture which is in many ways built on pain and suffering. Here it is relevant to recall the work of Vladimir Nabokov, who considered that the message of all of his literary work consisted in the phrase ‘Death is sweet; this is a secret’. Nabokov enciphered this phrase into one of his stories".

=== Side Space of the Sacred aka Amber Room ===
Side Space of the Sacred was created and shown in 1992 in Vienna. The design of the installation is quite simple. Located at the centre of the room are three smooth, large, white “Kolobok spheres” with tranquil, sleeping faces (Kolobok is a character from Russian folklore, a round bread bun who runs away from the woman baking him and has numerous adventures). In the corners of the room there are four “little altars”. Each “little altar” includes an Orthodox icon, a red cushion, a small dish, and a wrinkled apple.

IMH in their introduction to the installation catalogue explain their idea as follows: “In speaking of the installation 'The Side Space of the Sacred', the very first thing to note is that, like most of our exhibition works, it possesses both 'internal' and 'external' functions simultaneously. Both functions are fundamentally illustrative.

The “external” function is basically an illustration of several hallucinatory plotlines, existing at the level of fundamental patternings of delirium on the ethno-semiotic plane, and, moreover, they exist not as “legitimate” components of these “narratives from the collective depths”, but as cavities, defects, whispers, cracks, parasitic “subplots” and other flaws of these narratives. Art, like hallucinosis, encounters in the first instance the spatial and acoustic parameters of all these “lower-depths events”, and therefore the metaphor of “parasites that leave tunnels in the compacted strata” is entirely appropriate, as is the metaphor of “cracks in the foundation”.

It is “hallucinations on a global theme” that are illustrated. The important thing here is the conceptual background of “common doings and things” which pervade “common bodies and spaces” through and through. Naturally, these global themes can be themes of the state, religion, money, the city, war and so on. What is important for us is that the unfolding of these hallucinations inevitably results in a comic effect (since this is an unfolding inwards into the banal). The psychodelicised levels of consciousness that have engendered these visions create them, in a certain sense, as “self-caricatures”.

The other, “internal” function of this installation is to illustrate the plotlines of our own text-formation, as performed within the framework of Medical Hermeneutics Inspection’s “laboratory of discourses”. From the viewpoint of this “internal” function, each element of the installation appears as a quotation from or reference to one or another of our texts (either already written or as yet only planned, and sometimes existing as a memory of an oral discussion). This kind of “reading” of our texts is in effect possible only for ourselves and also, perhaps, for certain of our close friends and co-authors. It is this that gives rise to the requirement for textual commentaries “for the catalogue”, by means of which this “laboratory” space of intersecting and unfolding or, on the contrary, stagnating discourses can be engaged as the exhibition background of the work itself".

=== The Alley of Longevity aka The Pipe ===
The Alley of Longevity was created in 1995 for an exhibition in Prague called ‘Flight, Departure, Disappearance’, curated by Milena Slavicka. It has since been presented in several important exhibitions in the Czech Republic, Germany and Switzerland, including at Art Basel Unlimited.

The installation consists of a wide tube hung at eye level surrounded by portrait drawings of babies and elderly men. Visitors can look through the pipe using binoculars. Inside, a small light bulb illuminates the scene of a cozy furnished room. In terms of the well-known metaphor “the light at the end of the tunnel” Pepperstein and Anufriev reinterpreted an ordinary object as a much more significant and sophisticated thing: as an attempt to find out what is at “the end”. The installation gives everyone the opportunity to pass along the Alley and momentarily come close to the final moment, which seems to be a quiet, beautiful, perfect place. But make only one step to the side, and this little paradise will disappear, revealing the mythological figure of the “Kolobkovost” or “Escape”, a recurring theme in the aesthetics of the Moscow conceptual school. The installation reflects the ideas and concepts of Medical Hermeneutics, and in particular is connected with the art movement of psychedelic realism. Articulating such categories as distance, time and disappearance, the artists reduced their size to infinity and embody a conceptual view of issues of life, death and immortality. This idea is revealed in the portrait gallery of the elderly men, whose ages reach astronomical numbers, and their infant counterparts, whose ages impossibly span backwards into minus figures, before they could be born. The Medical Hermeneutic group’s characters are outside of the past and future. They are the embodiment of eternity.

== Exhibitions ==
2015

- t:h:e r:e:a:l:after psychedelia. Contemporary Art Centre, Vilnius, Lithuania
- t:h:e r:e:a:l:after psychedelia. Contemporary Art Museum, Tallinn, Estonia

2014

- Before Normal:Concept After Concept. Roskilde Museum of Contemporary Art, Copenhagen, Denmark

2012

- Utopia Gesamtkunstwerk. Galerie Belvedere, Vienna
- The Alley of Longevity. Regina Gallery, Moscow

2010

- A History of Irritated Material. Raven Row Gallery, London

2009

- Pavel Pepperstein & Inspection Medical Hermeneutics. Kewenig Gallery, Cologne.

1998

- Binoculars and Monocle / Life and work. Kunsthaus Zug, Switzerland

1997

- Portrait of an Old Man. (with Igor Dmitriev), State Russian Museum, St. Petersburg

1996

- White Window. Villa Waldberta, Munich

1994

- We are your Granddad. Festival Europe 94, Munich
- Worry in the Tower. Galerie Inge Baecker. Cologne
- Processions. Human Space Art Centre, Milan
- Paramen. Galerie Grita Insam, Vienna
- White Window. Villa Waldberta, Feldafing, Germany

1993

- Switzerland + Medicine. Swiss Institute, New York
- Drawings on Margins. MANI Museum, Moscow
- Empty Icons. L Gallery, Moscow
- Golden Icons and Black Line. Kunstverein Hamburg, Hamburg

1992

- Blickwingel – Das Sakrale in der USSR. Galerie Insam, Vienna
- Sweiz + Medicine. Shedhalle Zurich, Zurich
- 19-91. Galerie Walcheturm, Zurich

1991

- Militaerlieben von kleinen Bildern. Galerie Krings-Ernst, Cologne

1990

- Orthodoxe Ablutschungen – Umschlage und Abschlusse. Kunsthalle, Düsseldorf
- Three Inspectors. Galeria Mladych, Prague

1989

- Three Children. Galeria Mladych, Prague
