= Stibiopalladinite =

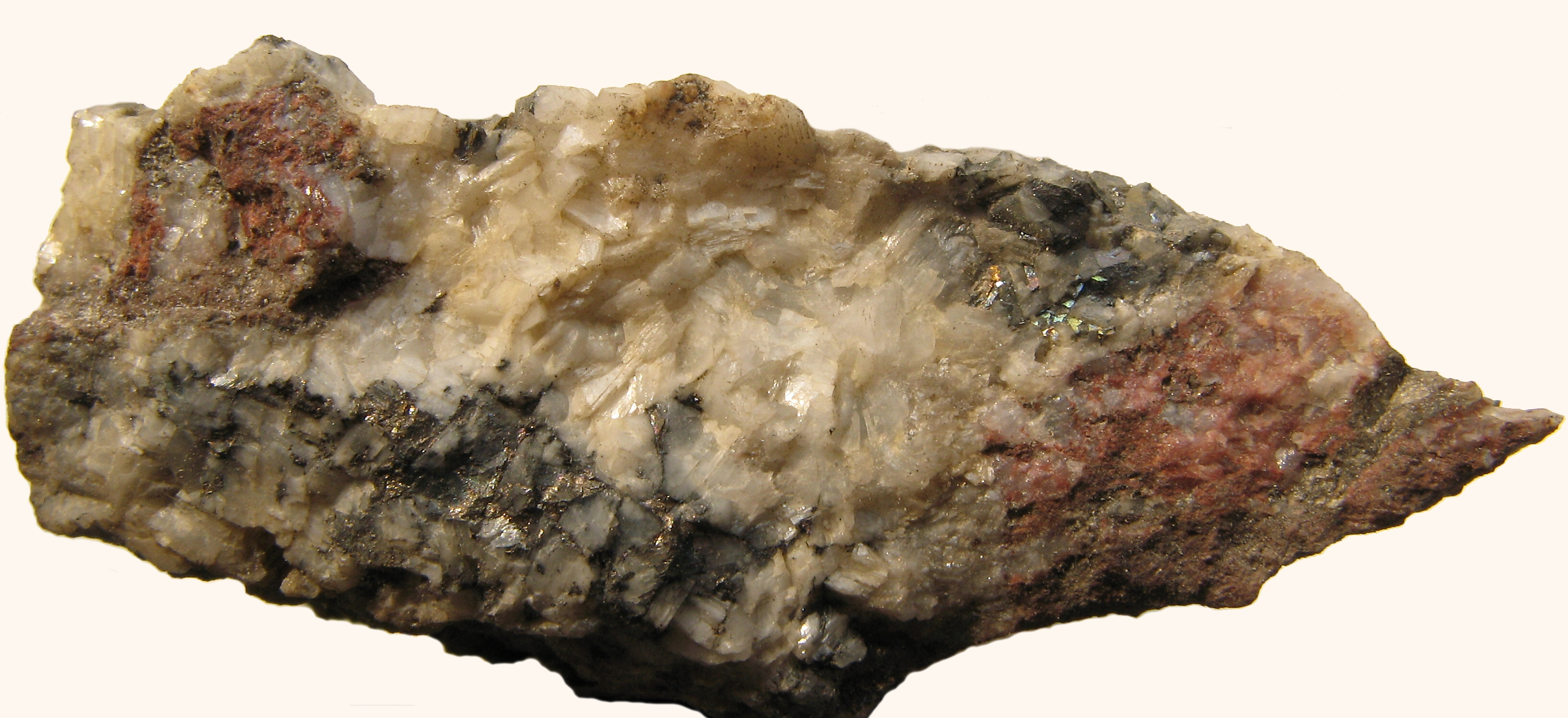
- Stibiopalladinite (metallic, center, below)

General
- Category: Sulfide mineral
- Formula: Pd_{5}Sb_{2}
- IMA symbol: Stpdn
- Strunz classification: 2.AC.20a
- Crystal system: Hexagonal
- Crystal class: Dihexagonal pyramidal (6mm); H-M symbol: (6mm)
- Space group: P6_{3}cm

Identification
- Color: Silver, white to steel-gray
- Mohs scale hardness: 4–5
- Luster: Metallic
- Streak: Black
- Diaphaneity: Opaque

Stibiopalladinite is a mineral containing the chemical elements palladium and antimony. Its chemical formula is Pd_{5}Sb_{2}. It is a silvery white to steel grey opaque mineral crystallizing in the hexagonal crystal system.

It was first described in 1929 for an occurrence in the Bushveld igneous complex of South Africa.

== Bibliography ==
- Emsley, John. Nature's Building Blocks. Oxford, 2001. ISBN 0-19-850341-5
