= Antimonide =

Compound of antimony

Antimonides (sometimes called stibnides or stibinides) are compounds of antimony with more electropositive elements. The antimonide ion is Sb^{3−} but the term refers also to any anionic derivative of antimony.

Antimonides are often prepared by heating the elements. Alternatively, sodium electride in ammonia dissolves antimony to give an antimonide upon evaporation.

The reduction of antimony leads to alkali metal antimonides of various types, depending on stoichiometry. Known antimonides include isolated Sb^{3−} ions (in Li_{3}Sb and Na_{3}Sb). Other motifs include dumbbells Sb^{4−}_{2} in Cs_{4}Sb_{2}, discrete antimony chains, for example, Sb^{8−}_{6} in SrSb_{3}, infinite spirals (Sb^{−})_{n} (in NaSb, RbSb), planar four-membered rings Sb^{2−}_{4}, Sb^{3−}_{7} cages in Li_{3}Sb_{7}, and net shaped anions Sb^{2−}_{3} in BaSb_{3}.

Some antimonides are semiconductors, e.g. those of the boron group such as indium antimonide. Being reducing, many antimonides are decomposed by oxygen.

== See also ==
- Antimonide mineral
