= Koashva =

Koashva Коашва
- Posyolok
- Interactive map of Koashva
- Location of Koashva Koashva (Murmansk Oblast)
- Coordinates: 67°39′21″N 34°4′56″E
- Country: Russia
- Federal subject: Murmansk Oblast
- Administrative district: Kirovsk
- Founded: 1977

Population (2010 Census)
  - Total: 882
  - Estimate (2007): 1,204 (+36.5%)
- Time zone: UTC+3 (MSK)
- Postal code: 184227
- Dialing code: +7 81531
- OKTMO ID: 47712000106

Koashva (Russian: Коашва) is a rural locality (a Posyolok) in Kirovsk municipality of Murmansk Oblast, Russia. The village is located beyond the Arctic Circle, on the Kola Peninsula.
