= Gold(III) sulfide =

Names
- IUPAC name Gold(III) sulfide
- Other names Auric sulfide, Gold trisulfide, Digold trisulfide

Identifiers
CAS Number	1303-61-3
3D model (JSmol)	Interactive image
ChemSpider	4953696
ECHA InfoCard	100.013.750
EC Number	215-124-2
PubChem CID	6451223
UNII	9VE32L584P
CompTox Dashboard (EPA)	DTXSID80926673
- InChI: InChI=1S/2Au.3S/q2*+3;3*-2 Key: WAUKTSZWNLNUDT-UHFFFAOYSA-N
- SMILES: [S-2].[S-2].[S-2].[Au+3].[Au+3]

Properties
Chemical formula	Au_{2}S_{3}
Molar mass	490.11 g·mol^{−1}
Appearance	Black powder
Density	8.750 g/cm^{3}
Solubility in water	Insoluble

Hazards
- GHS labelling
Pictograms	(GHS07: Exclamation mark)
Signal word	Warning
Hazard statements	H315, H319, H335
Precautionary statements	P261, P264, P271, P280, P302+P352, P304+P312, P304+P340, P305+P351+P338, P312, P321, P332+P313, P337+P313, P362, P403+P233, P405, P501
- Except where otherwise noted, data are given for materials in their standard state (at 25 °C [77 °F], 100 kPa). Infobox references

Gold(III) sulfide or auric sulfide is an inorganic compound with the formula Au_{2}S_{3}. Auric sulfide has been described as a black and amorphous solid. Only the amorphous phase has been produced, and the only evidence of existence is based on thermal analysis.

== Claims ==
Early investigations claimed to prepare auric sulfide by the reaction of lithium tetrachloroaurate with hydrogen sulfide:

2 Li[AuCl_{4}] + 3 H_{2}S → Au_{2}S_{3} + 2 LiCl + 6 HCl

Similar preparations via chloroauric acid, auric chloride, or gold(III) sulfate a claimed proceed in anhydrous solvents, but water evinces a redox decomposition into metallic gold in sulfuric acid:

8 Au^{3+} + 3 S^{2−} + 12 H_{2}O → 8 Au + 3 H_{2}SO_{4} + 18 H^{+}

Conversely, it is claimed that cyclo-octasulfur reduces gold(III) sulfate to a mixture of gold sulfides and sulfur oxides:

Au_{2}(SO_{4})_{3} + S_{8} → Au_{2}S_{3} + Au_{2}S + 4 SO_{3} + 6 SO_{2}

Auric sulfide has also been claimed as the product when auric acetate is sonicated with cyclo-octasulfur in decalin.

Auric sulfide is claimed to react with nitric acid as well sodium cyanide. It is claimed to dissolve in concentrated sodium sulfide solution.

== See also ==
- Gold(I) sulfide
