= Antimonide mineral =

Mineral

An antimonide mineral is a mineral that contains antimonide for its main anion. The antimonides are structurally similar to the sulfides and are grouped with them in both the Dana and Strunz mineral classification systems.

Examples include:

- Breithauptite
- Cuprostibite
- Stibiopalladinite
