= International Geology Review =

- Discipline: Geology, petroleum geology, economic geology, tectonics, geochemistry, petrology
- Language: English
- Edited by: Robert Stern

Publication details
- History: 1959–present
- Publisher: Taylor & Francis
- Frequency: 18/year

Standard abbreviations
- ISO 4: Int. Geol. Rev.

Indexing
- ISSN: 0020-6814 (print); 1938-2839 (web)

Links
- Journal homepage; Online access; Online archive

International Geology Review is a peer-reviewed geoscientific publication dedicated to publishing original and timely research papers as well as in-depth scholarly reviews dealing with a wide range of topics related to the Earth sciences. The journal is published by Taylor and Francis. Geographic coverage is global and work on any part of the world is considered. The journal has been published since 1959.

It was ranked 20 out of 253 Geology journals for 2018 by Scimago https://www.scimagojr.com/journalrank.php?category=1907&year=2018

Editor-in-Chief is Robert J. Stern.
