= Krennerite =

Gold telluride mineral

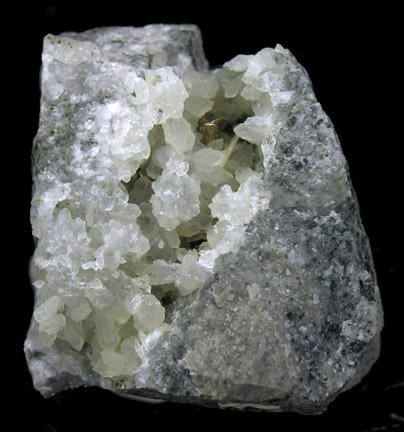
- Krennerite in a quartz vein, Cresson Mine, Cripple Creek, Colorado

General
- Category: Telluride mineral
- Formula: AuTe_{2} to Au_{3}AgTe_{8}
- IMA symbol: Knn
- Strunz classification: 2.EA.15
- Crystal system: Orthorhombic
- Crystal class: Pyramidal (mm2)
- Space group: Orthorhombic; H-M symbol: (mm2); Space group: Pma2

Identification
- Color: Silver white to brass yellow (tarnish?) – creamy white (polished section)
- Crystal habit: Massive to crystalline with short striated prismatic crystals
- Cleavage: Perfect on {001}
- Fracture: Subconchoidal – uneven
- Tenacity: Brittle
- Mohs scale hardness: 2.5
- Luster: High metallic
- Streak: greenish grey
- Diaphaneity: opaque
- Specific gravity: 8.62
- Optical properties: Anisotrophism strong
- Refractive index: Opaque
- Pleochroism: weak
- Ultraviolet fluorescence: None

Krennerite is an orthorhombic gold telluride mineral which can contain variable amounts of silver in the structure. The formula is AuTe_{2}, but specimen with gold substituted by up to 24% with silver have been found ([Au_{0.77}Ag_{0.24}]Te_{2}). Both of the chemically similar gold-silver tellurides, calaverite and sylvanite, are in the monoclinic crystal system, whereas krennerite is orthorhombic.

The color varies from silver-white to brass-yellow. It has a specific gravity of 8.62 and a hardness of 2.5. It occurs in high temperature, hydrothermal environments.

Krennerite was discovered in 1878 near the village of Săcărâmb, Romania, and first described by the Hungarian mineralogist Joseph Krenner (1839–1920).

== See also ==
- List of minerals
- List of minerals named after people
