= Gold(I) sulfide =

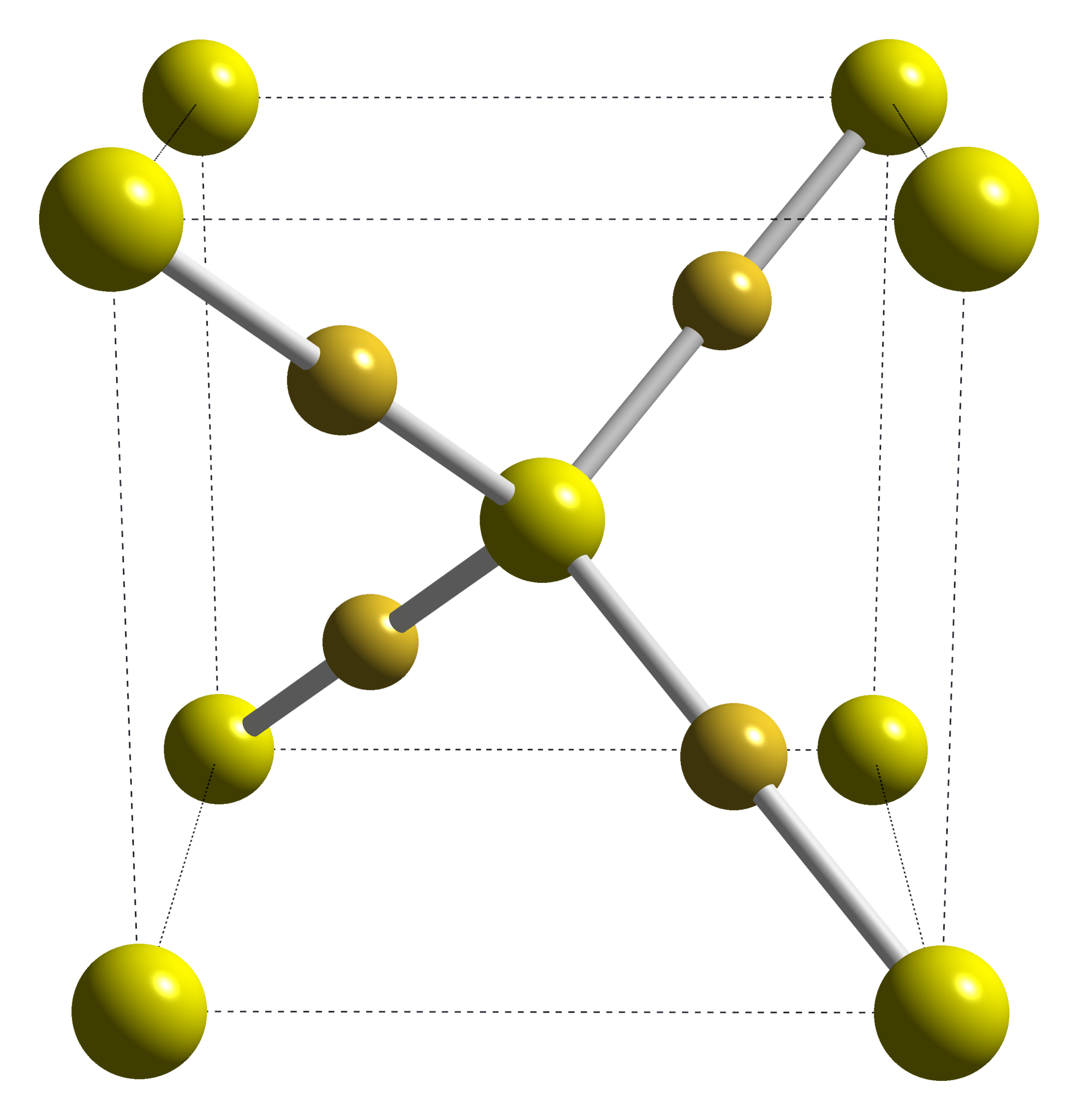
- Gold(I) sulfide unit cell

Names
- IUPAC name Gold(I) sulfide
- Other names Aurous sulfide

Identifiers
CAS Number	1303-60-2
3D model (JSmol)	Interactive image
ChemSpider	14028556
ECHA InfoCard	100.013.749
EC Number	215-123-7
PubChem CID	22904715
UNII	03VC3O9F7W
CompTox Dashboard (EPA)	DTXSID2061648
- InChI: InChI=1S/2Au.S/q2*+1;-2 Key: YVIYNOINIIHOCG-UHFFFAOYSA-N
- SMILES: [S-2].[Au+].[Au+]

Properties
Chemical formula	Au_{2}S
Molar mass	425.998 g/mol
Density	11 g/cm^{3}
Melting point	240 °C (464 °F; 513 K)
Solubility in water	Insoluble

Related compounds
Other anions	Copper(I) sulfide
- Except where otherwise noted, data are given for materials in their standard state (at 25 °C [77 °F], 100 kPa). verify (what is ?) Infobox references

Gold(I) sulfide is the inorganic compound with the formula Au_{2}S. It is the principal sulfide of gold. It decomposes to gold metal and elemental sulfur, illustrating the "nobility" of gold.

== Structure and preparation ==
The compound crystallizes in the motif seen for cuprous oxide: gold is 2-coordinate, sulfur 4-coordinate, and the S-Au-S linkage is linear. Linear coordination geometry is typical of gold(I) compounds, e.g. the coordination complex chloro(dimethyl sulfide)gold(I). The structure is similar to the α form of silver sulfide (argentite), which only exists at high temperatures.

It can be prepared by treating gold chloride with hydrogen sulfide It also arises by sulfiding dicyanoaurate:

H_{2}S + 2 K[Au(CN)_{2}] → Au_{2}S + 2 KCN + 2 HCN

This product is described as "initially dark reddish-brown" solid that turns "steel-gray".
