= Bilibinskite =

Telluride mineral

General
- Category: Telluride mineral
- Formula: Au_{3}Cu_{2}PbTe_{2}
- IMA symbol: Bb
- Strunz classification: 02.BA.55
- Crystal system: Cubic
- Crystal class: Sulfide

Identification
- Formula mass: 1,180.39 g/mol
- Color: Bronze colored, light brown or brownish-pink
- Crystal habit: Massive
- Cleavage: None
- Mohs scale hardness: 4.5 – 5
- Luster: Sub-metallic
- Streak: golden brown
- Diaphaneity: opaque
- Density: 14.27
- Optical properties: Anisotropic
- Other characteristics: IMA Status Approved (1978)

Bilibinskite is an Au – Cu – Pb telluride. It is a rare mineral that was named after Soviet geologist Yuri Bilibin (1901–1952), who researched the geology of gold deposits during the time of the USSR.

== Properties ==
Bilibinskite is a metallic mineral with a color that ranges from opaque bronze-colored to light-brown or brownish-pink. It has a sub-metallic luster, a brown streak color and has no fission. Bilibinskite crystallizes in the cubic system. It has a high relative density of 14.27. The mineral has a hardness of 4.5 to 5 and it is not radioactive.

== Occurrence ==
Bilibinskite is a very rare mineral that formed in the weathering zones of gold tellurides. The type locality is the Kamchatka Peninsula (Aginskoe gold deposit) in the Russian Far East, where the mineral was discovered in 1978. It has also been found in hypogene ores of Kazakhstan, Xinjiang and Tuva.

== See also ==
- List of minerals named after people
