= Dolomite (rock) =

Sedimentary carbonate rock containing a high percentage of the mineral dolomite

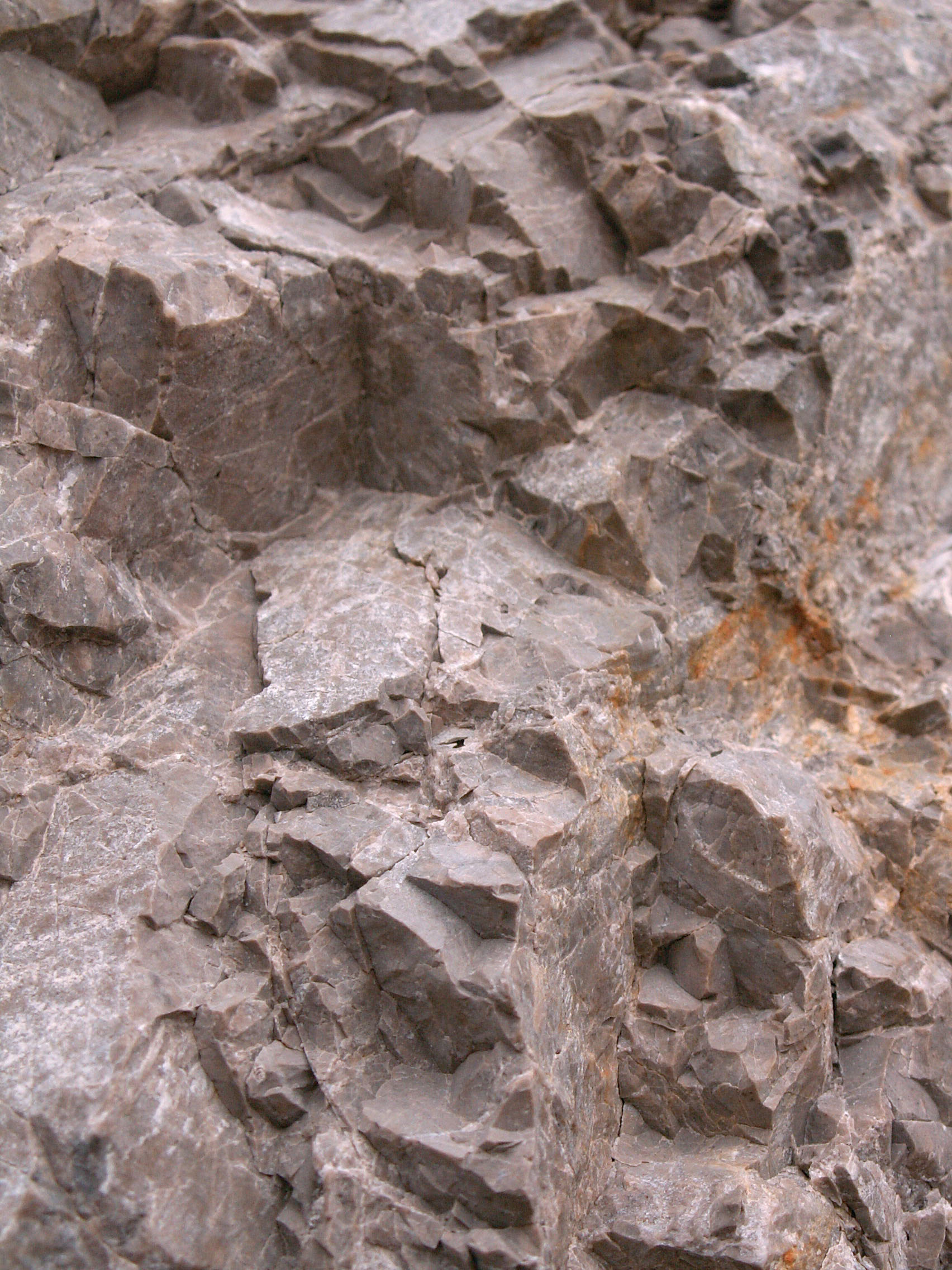
Triassic dolomitic rocks from Slovakia

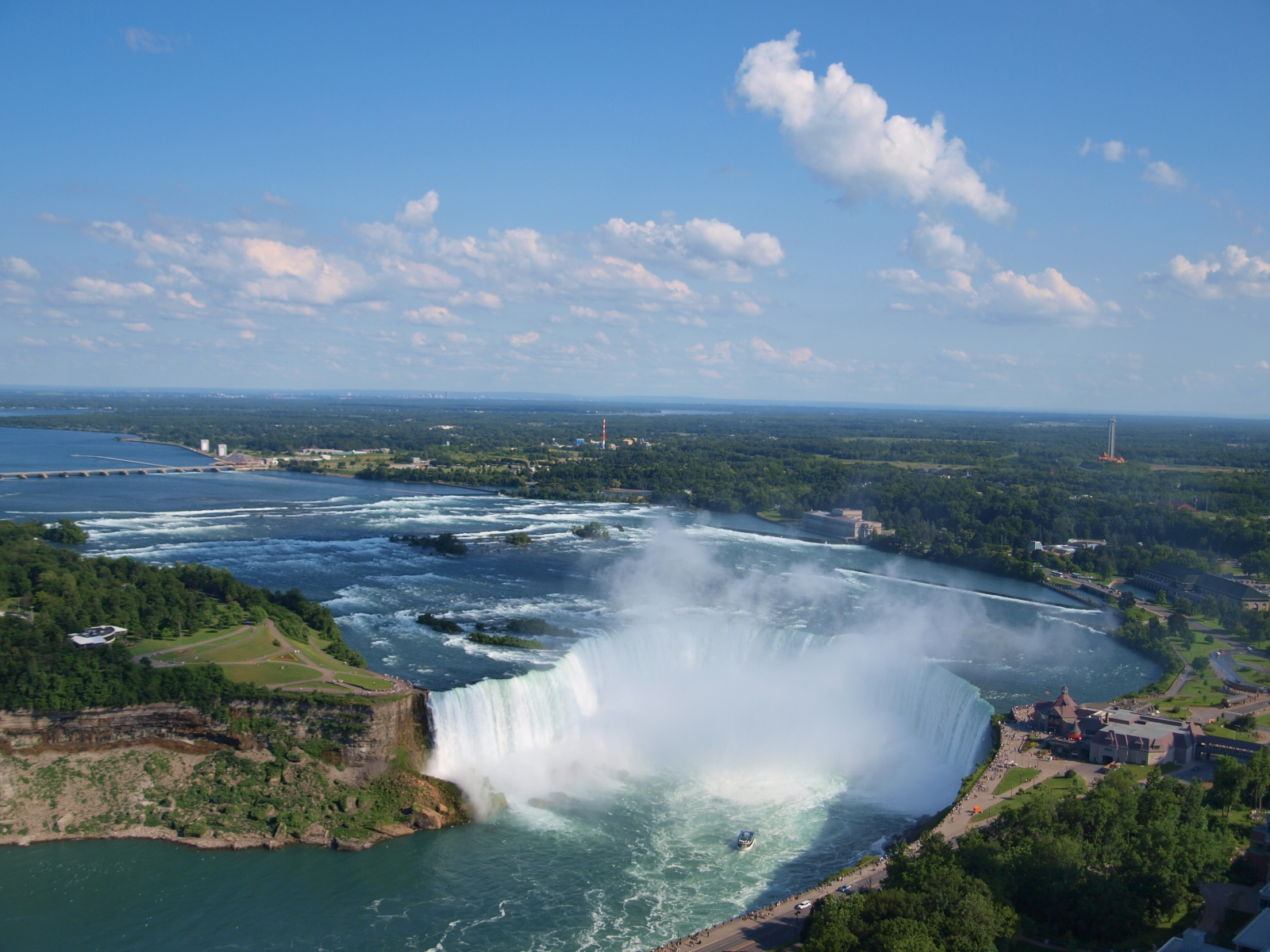
Erosion of dolomite over weaker shale created the Niagara Escarpment

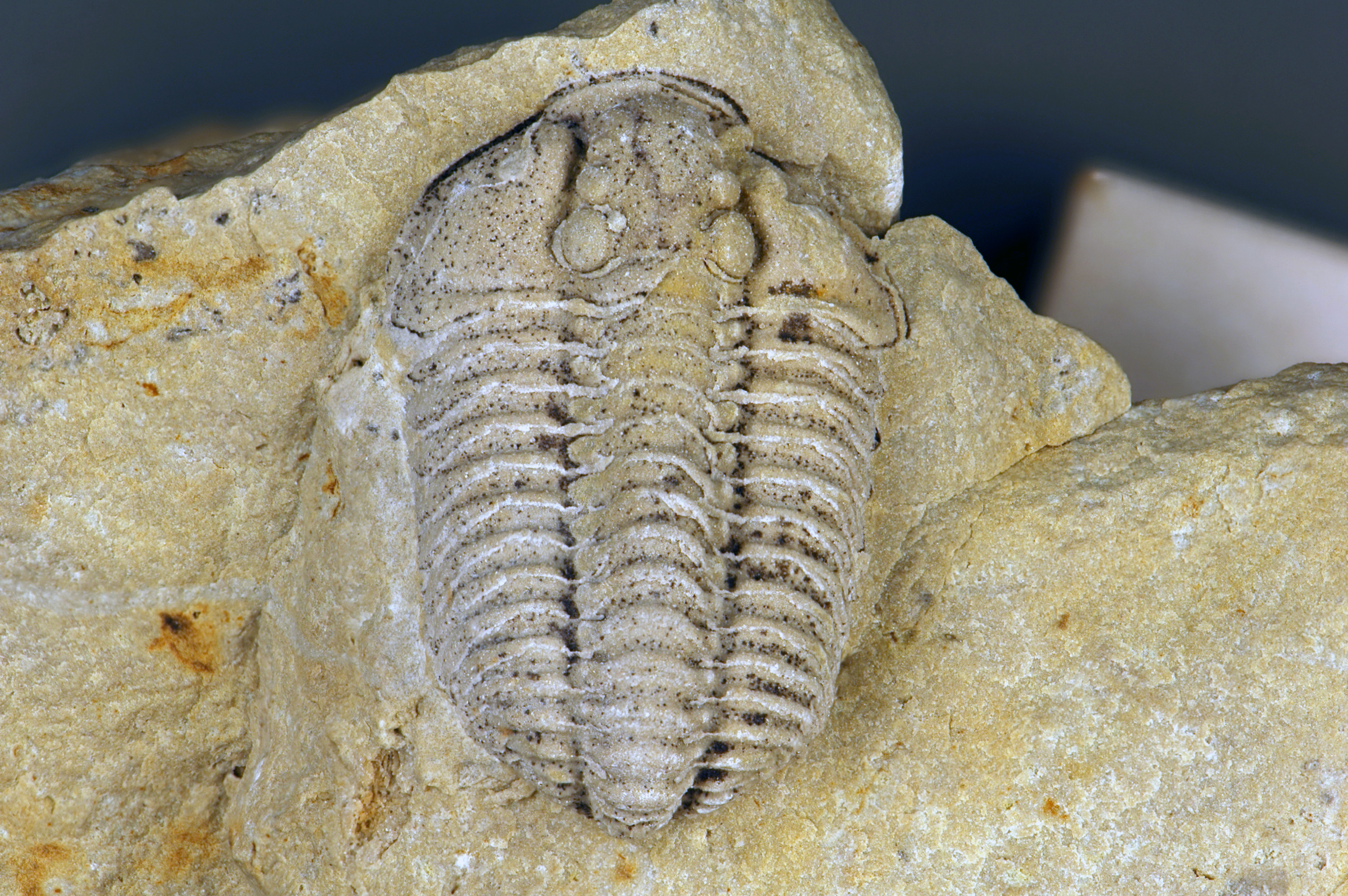
Trilobite fossil preserved as an internal cast in Silurian dolomite from southwestern Ohio, US

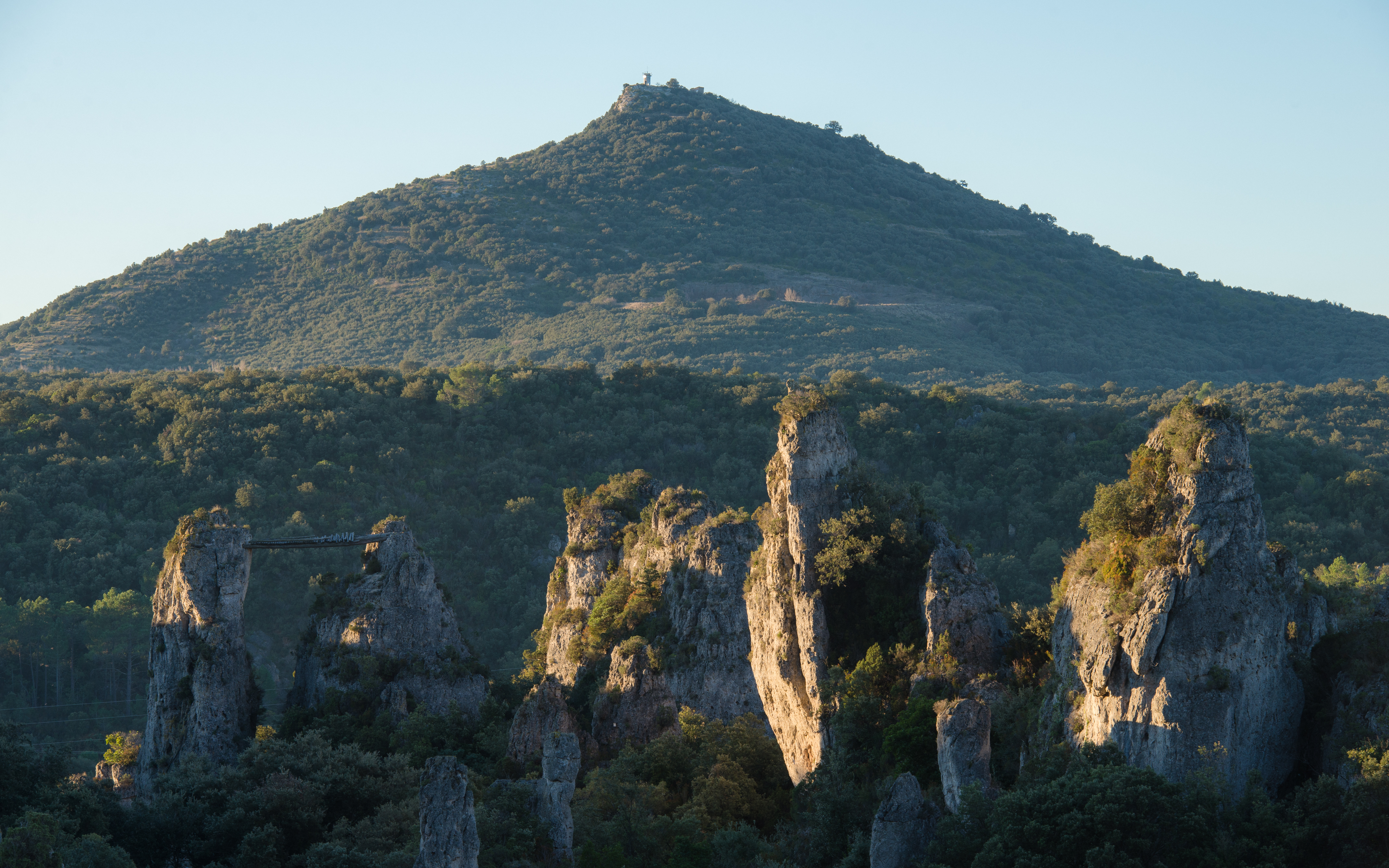
Erosion of dolomitic rocks in Mourèze, Hérault, France

Dolomite (also known as dolomite rock, dolostone or dolomitic rock) is a sedimentary carbonate rock that contains a high percentage of the mineral dolomite, CaMg(CO_{3})_{2}. It occurs widely, often in association with limestone and evaporites, though it is less abundant than limestone and rare in Cenozoic rock beds (beds less than about 66 million years in age). One of the first geologists to distinguish dolomite from limestone was Déodat Gratet de Dolomieu, a French mineralogist and geologist after whom it is named. He recognized and described the distinct characteristics of dolomite in the late 18th century, differentiating it from limestone.

Most dolomite was formed as a magnesium replacement of limestone or of lime mud before lithification. The geological process of conversion of calcite to dolomite is known as dolomitization and any intermediate product is known as dolomitic limestone. The "dolomite problem" refers to the vast worldwide depositions of dolomite in the past geologic record in contrast to the limited amounts of dolomite formed in modern times. Sulfate-reducing bacteria living in anoxic conditions can precipitate dolomite suggesting that some past dolomite deposits might be due to microbial activity. Recent laboratory research focused on the crystal growth of dolomite at the microscopic scale has revealed that multiple cycles of precipitation/dissolution can promote the growth of dolomite crystals.

Dolomite is resistant to erosion and can either contain bedded layers or be unbedded. It is less soluble than limestone in weakly acidic groundwater, but it can still develop solution features (karst) over time. Dolomite rock with a sufficient porosity can act as an oil and natural gas reservoir.

== Name ==
Dolomite takes its name from the 18th-century French mineralogist Déodat Gratet de Dolomieu (1750–1801), who was one of the first to describe the mineral. Dolomite was analysed by the Swiss chemist Nicolas Théodore de Saussure who named the mineral after Dolomieu in March 1792.

The term dolomite refers to both the calcium-magnesium carbonate mineral and to the sedimentary rock formed predominantly of this mineral. The term dolostone was introduced in 1948 to avoid confusion between the two. However, the usage of the term dolostone is controversial, because the name dolomite was first applied to the rock during the late 18th century and thus has technical precedence. The use of the term dolostone is not recommended by the Glossary of Geology published by the American Geological Institute.

In old USGS publications, dolomite was referred to as magnesian limestone, a term now reserved for magnesium-deficient dolomites or magnesium-rich limestones.

== Description ==
Dolomite rock is defined as sedimentary carbonate rock composed of more than 50% mineral dolomite. Dolomite is characterized by its nearly ideal 1:1 stoichiometric ratio of magnesium to calcium. It is distinct from high-magnesium limestone in that the magnesium and calcium form ordered layers within the individual dolomite mineral grains, rather than being arranged at random, as they are in high-magnesium calcite grains. In natural dolomite, magnesium is typically between 44 and 50 percent of total magnesium plus calcium, indicating some substitution of calcium into the magnesium layers. A small amount of ferrous iron typically substitutes for magnesium, particularly in more ancient dolomites. Carbonate rock tends to be either almost all calcite or almost all dolomite, with intermediate compositions being quite uncommon.

Dolomite outcrops are recognized in the field by their softness (mineral dolomite has a Mohs hardness of 4 or less, well below common silicate minerals) and because dolomite bubbles feebly when a drop of dilute hydrochloric acid is dropped on it. This distinguishes dolomite from limestone, which is also soft but reacts vigorously with dilute hydrochloric acid. Dolomite usually weathers to a characteristic dull yellow-brown color due to the presence of ferrous iron. It produces scratches at a level 6 and deeper grooves at a level 7. This is released and oxidized as the dolomite weathers. Dolomite is usually granular in appearance, with a texture resembling grains of sugar.

Under the microscope, thin sections of dolomite usually show individual grains that are well-shaped rhombs, with considerable pore space. As a result, subsurface dolomite is generally more porous than subsurface limestone and makes up 80% of carbonate rock petroleum reservoirs. This texture contrasts with limestone, which is usually a mixture of grains, micrite (very fine-grained carbonate mud) and sparry cement. The optical properties of calcite and mineral dolomite are difficult to distinguish, but calcite almost never crystallizes as regular rhombs, and calcite is stained by Alizarin Red S while dolomite grains are not. Dolomite rock consisting of well-formed grains with planar surfaces is described as planar or idiotopic dolomite, while dolomite consisting of poorly-formed grains with irregular surfaces is described as nonplanar or xenotopic dolomite. The latter likely forms by recrystallization of existing dolomite at elevated temperature (over 50 to 100 °C (122 to 212 °F)).

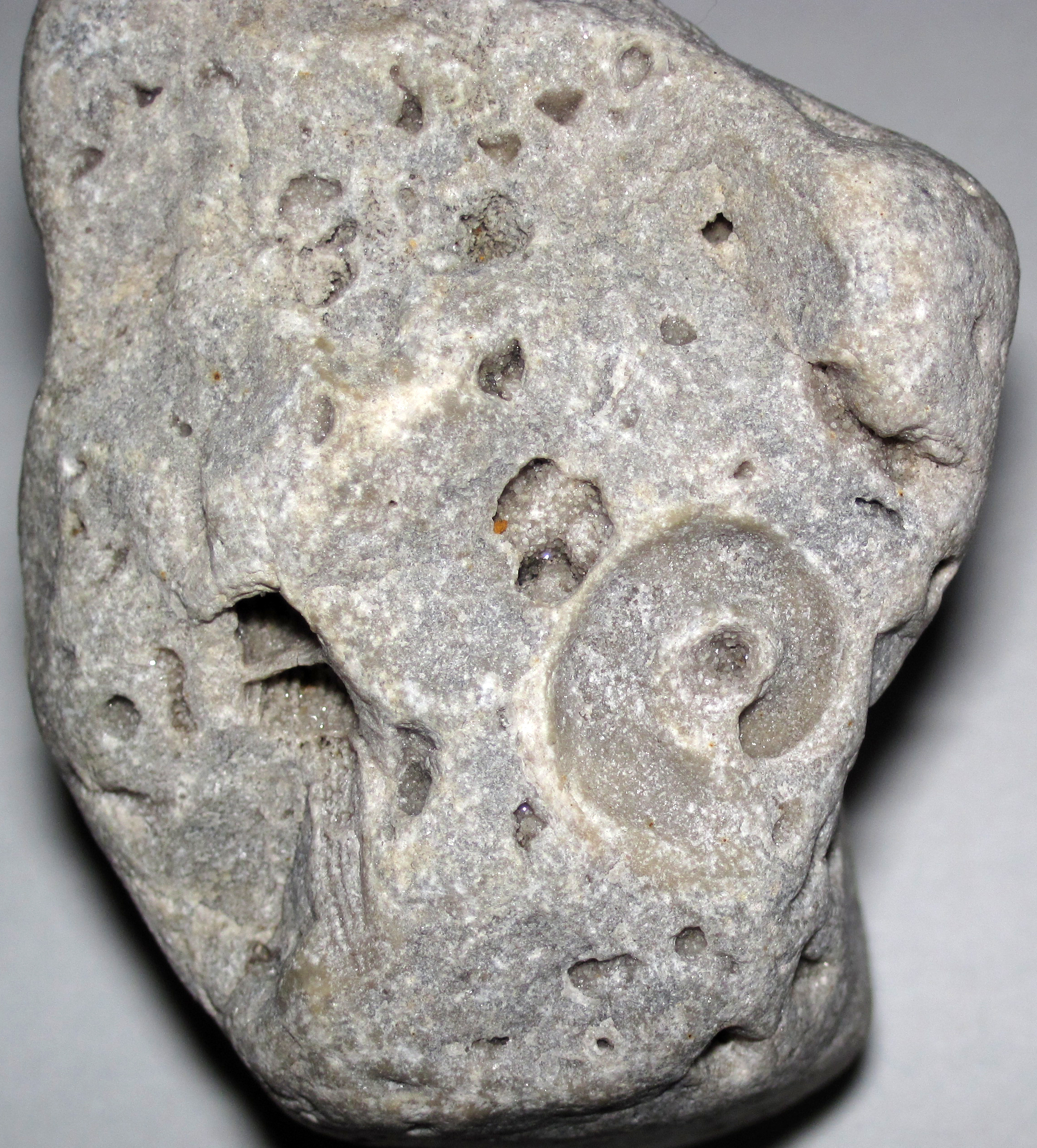
External mold fossil gastropod found in dolomite.

The texture of dolomite often shows that it is secondary, formed by replacement of calcium by magnesium in limestone. The preservation of the original limestone texture can range from almost perfectly preserved to completely destroyed. Under a microscope, dolomite rhombs are sometimes seen to replace oolites or skeletal particles of the original limestone. There is sometimes selective replacement of fossils, with the fossil remaining mostly calcite and the surrounding matrix composed of dolomite grains. Sometimes dolomite rhombs are seen cut across the fossil outline. However, some dolomite shows no textural indications that it was formed by replacement of limestone.

== Occurrence and origin ==
Dolomite is widespread in its occurrences, though not as common as limestone. It is typically found in association with limestone or evaporite beds and is often interbedded with limestone. There is no consistent trend in its abundance with age, but most dolomite appears to have formed at high stands of sea level. Little dolomite is found in Cenozoic beds (beds less than 65 million years old), which has been a time of generally low sea levels. Times of high sea level also tend to be times of a greenhouse Earth, and it is possible that greenhouse conditions (elevated pCO_{2} and temperature) are the trigger for dolomite formation.

Many dolomites show clear textural indications that they are secondary dolomites, formed by replacement of limestone. However, although much research has gone into understanding this process of dolomitization, the process remains poorly understood. There are also fine-grained dolomites showing no textural indications that they formed by replacement, and it is uncertain whether they formed by replacement of limestone that left no textural traces or are true primary dolomites. This dolomite problem was first recognized over two centuries ago but is still not fully resolved.

The dolomitization reaction

2 CaCO_{3} + Mg^{2+} → (Ca,Mg)(CO_{3})_{2} + Ca^{2+}

is thermodynamically favorable, with a Gibbs free energy of about -2.2 kcal/mol. In theory, ordinary seawater contains sufficient dissolved magnesium (the second most abundant cation in seawater) to cause dolomitization. However, because of the very slow rate of diffusion of ions in solid mineral grains at ordinary temperatures, the process can occur only by simultaneous dissolution of calcite and crystallization of dolomite. This in turn requires that large volumes of magnesium-bearing fluids are flushed through the pore space in the dolomitizing limestone. Several processes have been proposed for dolomitization.

The hypersaline model (also known as the evaporative reflux model) is based on the observation that dolomite is very commonly found in association with limestone and evaporites, with the limestone often interbedded with the dolomite. According to this model, dolomitization takes place in a closed basin where seawater is subject to high rates of evaporation. This results in precipitation of gypsum and aragonite, raising the magnesium to calcium ratio of the remaining brine. The brine is also dense, so it sinks into the pore space of any underlying limestone (seepage refluxion), flushing out the existing pore fluid and causing dolomitization. The Permian Basin of North America has been put forward as an example of an environment in which this process took place. A variant of this model has been proposed for sabkha environments (supratidal mudflats or sandflats) in which brine is sucked up into the dolomitizing limestone by evaporation of capillary fluids, a process called evaporative pumping.

Another model is the mixing-zone or Dorag model, in which meteoric water mixes with seawater already present in the pore space, increasing the chemical activity of magnesium relative to calcium and causing dolomitization. The formation of Pleistocene dolomite reefs in Jamaica has been attributed to this process. However, this model has been heavily criticized, with one 2004 review paper describing it bluntly as "a myth". A 2021 paper argued that the mixing zone serves as domain of intense microbial activity which promotes dolomitization.

A third model postulates that normal seawater is the dolomitizing fluid, and the necessary large volumes are flushed through the dolomitizing limestone through tidal pumping. Dolomite formation at Sugarloaf Key, Florida, may be an example of this process. A similar process might occur during rises in sea level, as large volumes of water move through limestone platform rock.

Regardless of the mechanism of dolomitization, the tendency of carbonate rock to be either almost all calcite or almost all dolomite suggests that, once the process is started, it completes rapidly. The process likely occurs at shallow depths of burial, under 100 meters (330 ft), where there is an inexhaustible supply of magnesium-rich seawater and the original limestone is more likely to be porous. On the other hand, dolomitization can proceed rapidly at the greater temperatures characterizing deeper burial, if a mechanism exists to flush magnesium-bearing fluids through the beds.

Mineral dolomite has a 12% to 13% smaller volume than calcite per alkaline earth cation. Thus dolomitization likely increases porosity and contributes to the sugary texture of dolomite.

=== The dolomite problem and primary dolomite ===
Dolomite is supersaturated in normal seawater by a factor of greater than ten, but dolomite is not seen to precipitate in the oceans. Likewise, geologists have not been successful at precipitating dolomite from seawater at normal temperatures and pressures in laboratory experiments. This is likely due to a very high activation energy for the nucleation of dolomite crystals.

The magnesium ion is relatively small and forms a tightly bound hydration shell when dissolved in water. In other words, the magnesium ion is surrounded by a clump of water molecules that are strongly attracted to its positive charge. Calcium is a larger ion, which reduces the binding strength of its hydration shell, so it is much easier for a calcium ion than for a magnesium ion to shed its hydration shell and bind to a growing crystal. It is also more difficult to nucleate a seed crystal of ordered dolomite than disordered high-magnesium calcite. As a result, attempts to precipitate dolomite from seawater precipitate high-magnesium calcite instead. This substance, which has an excess of calcium over magnesium and lacks calcium-magnesium ordering, is sometimes called protodolomite. Raising the temperature makes it easier for magnesium to shed its hydration shell, and dolomite can be precipitated from seawater at temperatures in excess of 60 °C (140 °F). Protodolomite also rapidly converts to dolomite at temperatures of 250 °C (482 °F) or higher. The high temperatures necessary for the formation of dolomite helps explain the rarity of Cenozoic dolomites (formed during the last 66 million years of Earth's history), since Cenozoic seawater temperatures seldom exceeded 40 °C.

It is possible that microorganisms can precipitate primary dolomite. This was first demonstrated in samples collected at Lagoa Vermelha, Brazil in association with sulfate-reducing bacteria (Desulfovibrio), leading to the hypothesis that sulfate ion inhibits dolomite nucleation (Mg^{2+} and SO_{4}^{2–} ions strongly interact to form a stable ion pair). Later laboratory experiments suggest bacteria can precipitate dolomite independently of the sulfate concentration. With time, other pathways of interaction between microbial activity and dolomite formation have been added to the discord regarding their role in modulation and generation of polysaccharides, manganese and zinc within the porewater. Meanwhile, a contrary view held by other researchers is that microorganisms precipitate only high-magnesium calcite but leave open the question of whether this can lead to precipitation of dolomite.

During the crystal growth of dolomite single crystals, the surface of the nuclei becomes progressively covered (1) by a series of well-ordered dolomite layers, (2) rapidly followed by disordered Mg-rich calcite layers. Mg-rich calcite being more soluble than dolomite, if, after a first step of crystal growth under supersaturated conditions, the external, poorly crystalline Mg-rich calcite layers are allowed to dissolve under unsaturated conditions, the crystal surface is cleaned and remains covered only by more stable, well-ordered dolomite thin layers. By repeating successive cycles of precipitation/dissolution, a single crystal can develop well-ordered dolomite surface layers after the removal of the more soluble, disordered Mg-rich calcite. It is speculated that the results obtained at the microscopic level on single crystals could be extrapolated at the geological formation scale if alternate conditions of precipitation and dissolution are encountered in shallow sea basins submitted to multiple cycles of evaporation and flooding. Meanwhile, this new mechanism does not exclude the others; it is just one more track to explore.

=== Dedolomitization ===
Dolomitization can sometimes be reversed, and a dolomite bed converted back to limestone. This is indicated by a texture of pseudomorphs of mineral dolomite that have been replaced with calcite. Dedolomitized limestone is typically associated with gypsum or oxidized pyrite, and dedolomitization is thought to occur at very shallow depths through infiltration of surface water with a very high ratio of calcium to magnesium.

== Uses ==
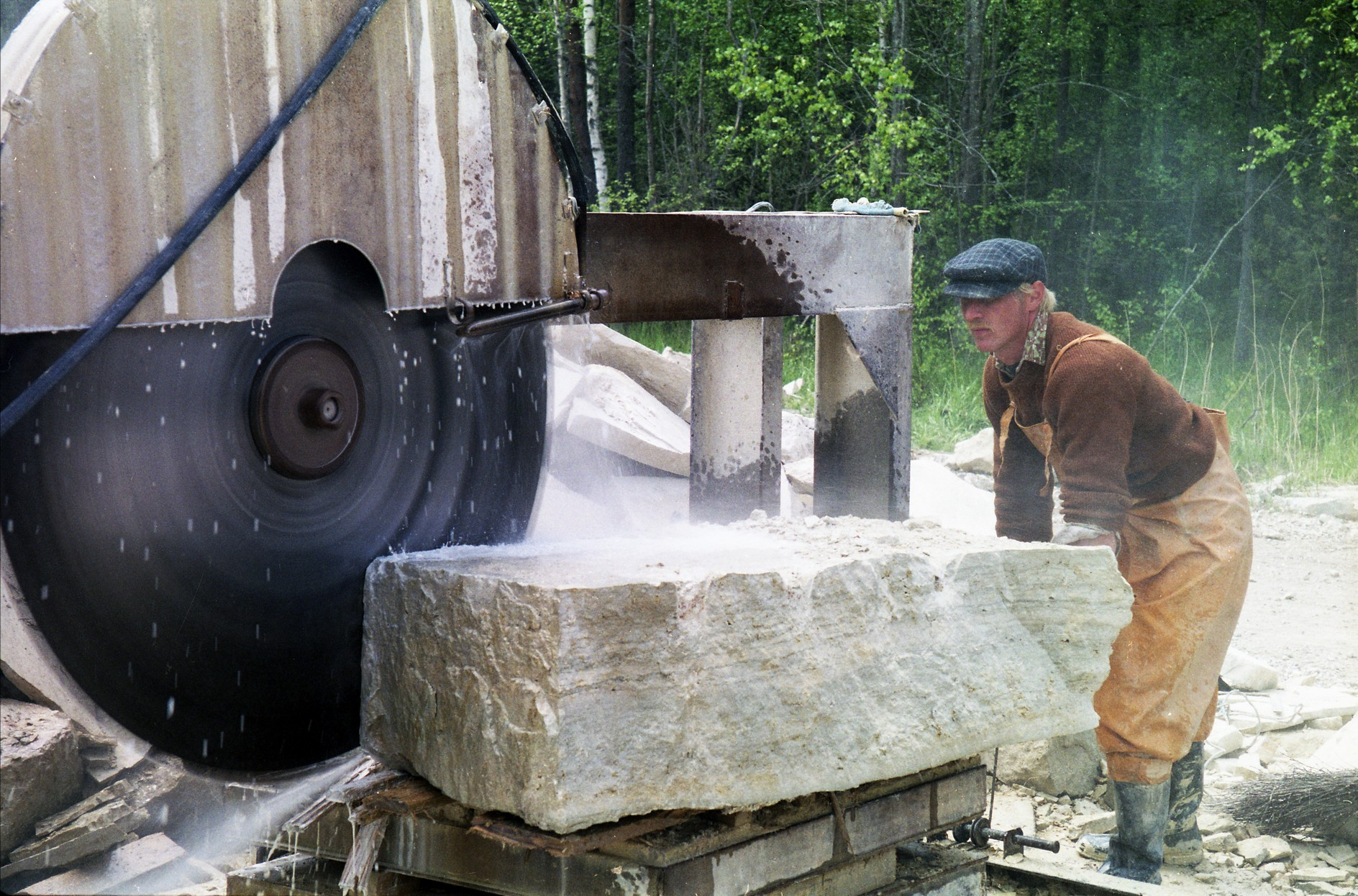
Cutting dolomite in 1994. Saaremaa, Estonia.

Dolomite is used for many of the same purposes as limestone, including as construction aggregate; in agriculture to neutralize soil acidity and supply calcium and magnesium; as a source of carbon dioxide; as dimension stone; as a filler in fertilizers and other products; as a flux in metallurgy; and in glass manufacturing. It cannot substitute for limestone in chemical processes that require a high-calcium limestone, such as manufacture of sodium carbonate. Dolomite is used for production of magnesium chemicals, such as Epsom salt, and is used as a magnesium supplement. It is also used in the manufacture of refractory materials.

== Caves in dolomite rock ==
As with limestone caves, natural caves and solution tubes typically form in dolomite rock as a result of the dissolution by weak carbonic acid. Caves can also, less commonly, form through dissolution of rock by sulfuric acid. Calcium carbonate speleothems (secondary deposits) in the forms of stalactites, stalagmites, flowstone etc., can also form in caves within dolomite rock. "Dolomite is a common rock type, but a relatively uncommon mineral in speleothems". Both the 'Union Internationale de Spéléologie' (UIS) and the American 'National Speleological Society' (NSS), extensively use in their publications, the terms "dolomite" or "dolomite rock" when referring to the natural bedrock containing a high percentage of CaMg(CO_{3})_{2} in which natural caves or solution tubes have formed.

=== Dolomite speleothems ===
Both calcium and magnesium go into solution when dolomite rock is dissolved. The speleothem precipitation sequence is: calcite, Mg-calcite, aragonite, huntite and hydromagnesite. Hence, the most common speleothem (secondary deposit) in caves within dolomite rock karst, is calcium carbonate in the most stable polymorph form of calcite. Speleothem types known to have a dolomite constituent include: coatings, crusts, moonmilk, flowstone, coralloids, powder, spar and rafts. Although there are reports of dolomite speleothems known to exist in a number of caves around the world, they are usually in relatively small quantities and form in very fine-grained deposits.

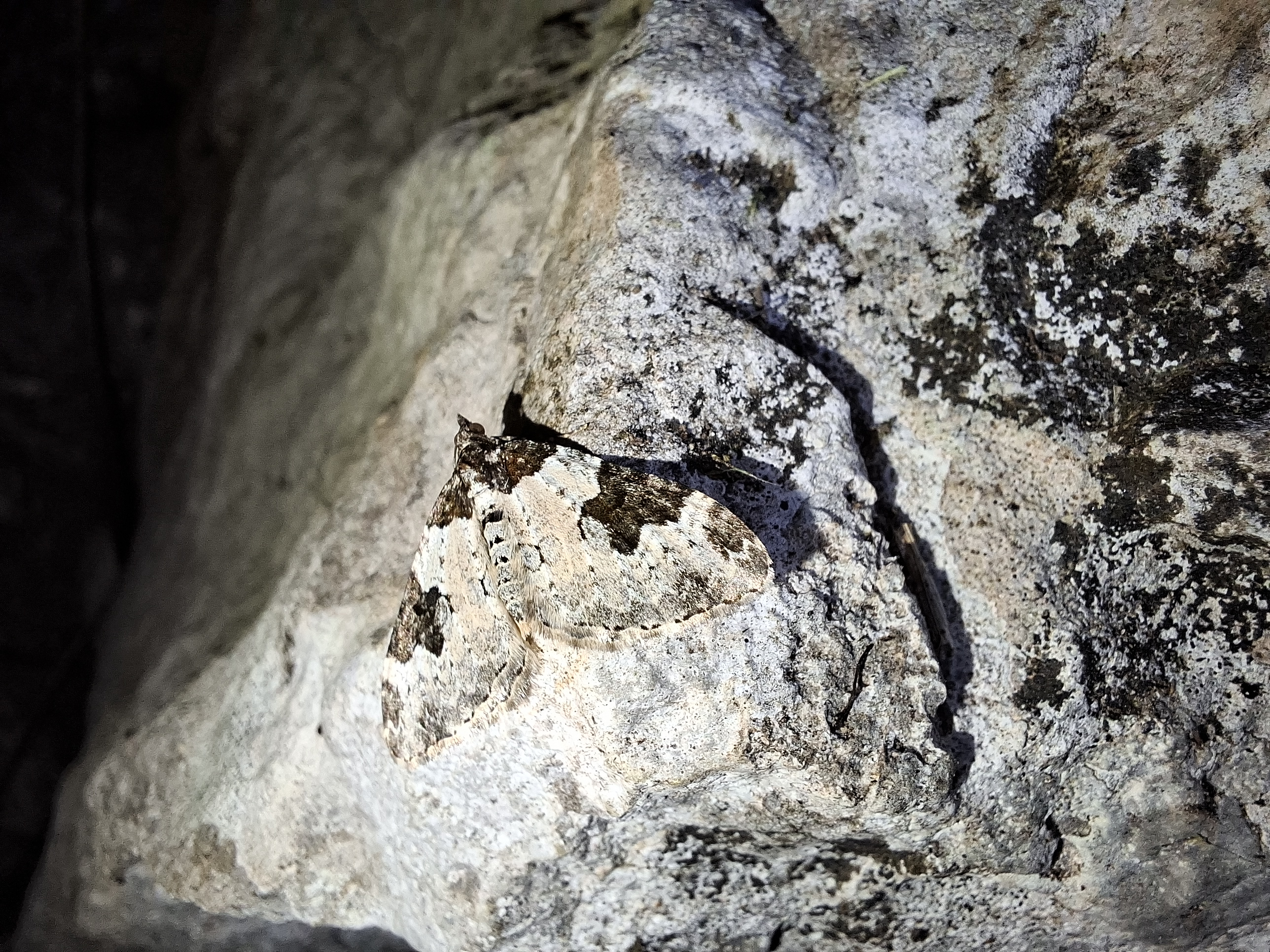
Xanthorhoe fluctuata has evolved to camouflage against white rock variants including dolomite rock

== See also ==
- Diagenesis
