= Huntite =

Carbonate mineral

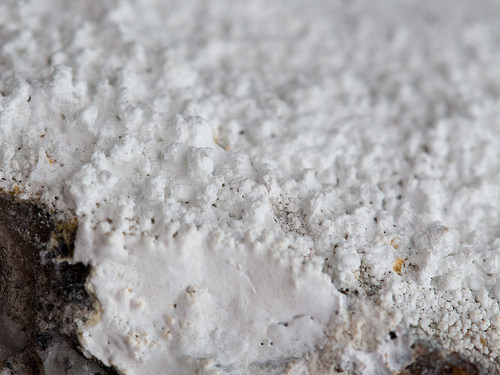

General
- Category: Carbonate mineral
- Formula: Mg_{3}Ca(CO_{3})_{4}
- IMA symbol: Hun
- Strunz classification: 5.AB.25
- Dana classification: 14.04.03.01
- Crystal system: Trigonal
- Crystal class: Trapezohedral (32); H-M symbol: (3 2)
- Space group: R32
- Unit cell: a = 9.505 Å, c = 7.821 Å; Z = 3

Identification
- Formula mass: 353 g/mol
- Color: White, lemon white
- Crystal habit: Platy crystals; compact chalklike masses
- Fracture: Subconchoidal
- Tenacity: Brittle
- Mohs scale hardness: 1–2
- Luster: Earthy (dull)
- Streak: White
- Diaphaneity: Translucent
- Specific gravity: 2.696
- Optical properties: Uniaxial (–)
- Refractive index: n_{ω} = 1.622 n_{ε} = 1.615

Huntite is a carbonate mineral with the chemical formula Mg_{3}Ca(CO_{3})_{4}. Huntite crystallizes in the trigonal system and typically occurs as platy crystals and powdery masses. For most of recorded history its main use was as a white pigment. Today the most common industrial use of huntite is as a natural mixture with hydromagnesite as a flame retardant or fire retardant additive for polymers.

== Discovery ==
In 1953, a paper by George Faust announced the discovery of a new carbonate mineral found in Currant Creek, Nevada (US). Faust acknowledged that the mineral probably had been discovered previously, but it had been misidentified as impure magnesite by W. E. Ford in 1917. Faust named the new mineral "huntite" in honour of his former teacher, Walter Frederick Hunt (1882–1975), Professor of Petrology at the University of Michigan. Faust carried out analyses of the mineral, and found amongst others that in differential thermal analysis huntite showed two endothermic peaks, which could be attributed to the dissociation of MgCO_{3} and CaCO_{3} respectively. Chemical analyses showed huntite to consist of Mg_{3}Ca(CO_{3})_{4}.

== Properties ==
Huntite often occurs in combination with other Mg/Ca carbonates such as dolomite, magnesite, and hydromagnesite. Large deposits of huntite occur in Turkey and Greece and these are commercially exploited because of its fire retardant properties. Huntite thermally decomposes over a temperature range of about 450–800 °C, releasing carbon dioxide and leaving a residue of magnesium and calcium oxides.

== Occurrences ==
Huntite has been found in a variety of environments. For example, it occurs in the modern carbonate sediments of the tidal flats bordering the Persian Gulf, in seasonal salt lakes of Turkey, in various playa lakes of British Columbia (Canada), in lacustrine deposits of Greece and in modern sabkha sediments in Tunisia.

Caves seem to be well suited for the low-temperature formation of huntite. For example, it has been reported from the caves of the Carlsbad Caverns National Park, New Mexico (US); in the Castleguard Cave (Alberta, Canada); in the Grotte de Clamouse, France; in various caves of the Transvaal Province of South Africa; in Clearwater Cave, Mulu, Sarawak in the Jenolan Caves, Australia; and in the Castañar Cave near Cáceres, Spain.

== Syntheses ==
In 1962, huntite was first synthesized by Biedl and Preisinger in experiments conducted at 100 °C and 3.2 bar CO_{2} pressure.

In 1983, Oomori et al. claimed laboratory synthesis of huntite at 33 °C when adding a sodium carbonate solution to concentrated seawater saturated with calcium bicarbonate. In 2006, Zaitseva et al. noted the precipitation of huntite at room temperature and atmospheric pressure. In laboratory experiments originally intended to synthesize magnesium calcite, they had added cultures of Microcoleus chtonoplastes (cyanobacteria) to seawater brine. After 10 months of continuously shaking the samples, they found huntite, magnesite, and aragonite. In 2012, Hopkinson et al. synthesized the mineral at 52 °C by reacting magnesium calcite with nesquehonite (MgCO_{3}·3H_{2}O).

== Genesis ==
Huntite, dolomite and magnesite appear to be so very closely related that a genetic relationship seems to be implied. In some instances, all three carbonates are found in close association; for example, Faust (1953) described huntite occurring together with dolomite and magnesite (amongst other minerals); Carpenter (1961) found huntite associated with aragonite, magnesium calcite and dolomite; Larrabee (1969) reported on huntite together with (amongst many others) aragonite, calcite, dolomite and magnesite in serpentinite on a weathered dunite rock. A weathered basalt in Australia was found to contain huntite in association with magnesite (Cole & Lancucki, 1975). Huntite together with magnesite was found by Calvo et al. (1995) in lake sediments of Northern Greece. Huntite in combination with magnesite occurs in a weathered serpentinite near Hrubšice, Czech Republic according to Němec (1981) According to the mineral and locations database of "mindat.org" huntite, together with aragonite, calcite, dolomite and magnesite, can be found in the "U Pustého Mlýna" quarry near Hrubšice, Czech Republic.

== Industrial use ==
The most common industrial use of huntite is as a natural mixture with hydromagnesite as a flame retardant or fire retardant additive for polymers. The heat of a fire will cause huntite to decompose releasing carbon dioxide into the flames. This helps to slow the spread of the fire. The release of carbon dioxide is endothermic, meaning that it absorbs heat, which helps to cool the burning material, slowing the fire's spread. These mixtures are alternatives to the more commonly used aluminium hydroxide.

== Conite ==
A mineral with exactly the same composition as that of huntite has been known for more than 200 years; in 1812 for example, John and Stromeyer described it as having a chemical composition of CaCO_{3}:MgCO_{3} = 1:3. In those days the mineral was known as conite (in German: Konit); a name given to it by Retzius (1798). However, a serious problem concerns where the mineral conite can be found. Originally, Retzius had found the new carbonate in a mineral collection and recognized it as a new species because it was harder than any known carbonate (even so hard that it would spark when struck with steel). Still, no indication was given regarding where this conite had been found. Some papers describing conite are known, without the exact location where it can be found. In 1804, Ludwig stated that the sample of conite studied by him, came "from Iceland". In 1805 Leonhard wrote that the conite he had analyzed, came "from Scandinavia". Somewhat more exact was Stromeyer in 1812, who claimed that his sample of conite had been found near the village of Frankenhayn, on the eastern slope of the Hoher Meissner near Kassel, Germany. However, this conite had been found as a loose boulder, and no outcrop of the new mineral was mentioned. In 1833, Blum summed up how conite could be found in mines near Freiberg (Germany), as boulders on the slopes of Mount Meissner (Germany) and on Iceland. In 1849, Hirzel repeated that conite could be found on the eastern slope of Mount Meissner, and in 1882, Schrauf reported the mineral from the magnesite deposits on the borders of the Schöninger Bach at Křemže near Budweis, Czech Republic. Because of the absence of a type locality for the mineral conite, a historical priority of its description over that of huntite cannot be claimed.
