= Frederick Augustus Genth =

United States chemist and mineralogist

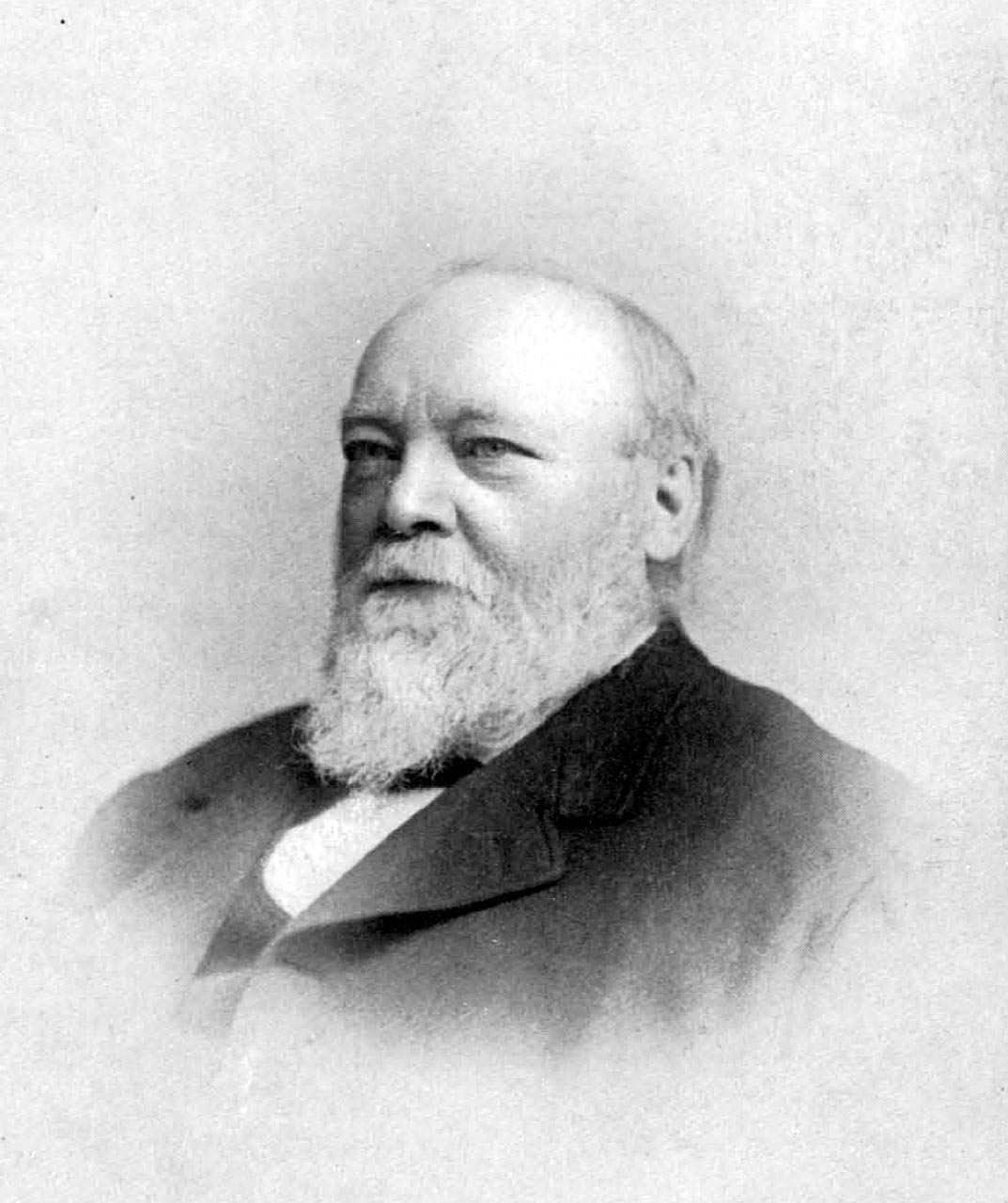
- Born: May 17, 1820; Wächtersbach, Hesse-Cassel, Germany
- Died: February 2, 1893 (aged 72); Philadelphia, Pennsylvania, United States
- Education: University of Marburg
- Scientific career
- Workplaces: University of Pennsylvania

Frederick Augustus Ludwig Karl Wilhelm Genth (May 17, 1820 – February 2, 1893) was a German-American chemist, specializing in analytical chemistry and mineralogy.

== Biography ==
Frederick Augustus Genth was born in Wächtersbach, Hesse-Cassel on May 17, 1820. He studied at the Hanau gymnasium and at the University of Heidelberg, under Justus von Liebig at Giessen, and finally under Christian Gerling (physics) and Robert Bunsen (chemistry) at Marburg, where he received the degree of Ph.D. in 1846. For three years (1845–1848) he acted as assistant to Bunsen.

In 1848, Genth immigrated to the United States. He settled in Philadelphia and organized an analytical laboratory. In 1872 he was appointed professor of chemistry and mineralogy at the University of Pennsylvania. He resigned his professorship in 1888, and re-established his laboratory. He also held the office of chemist to the Geological Survey of Pennsylvania and also to the board of agriculture of that state.

Genth was a member of many scientific societies in the United States: he was elected in 1872 to membership in the National Academy of Sciences; he was a member of the American Philosophical Society (elected 1886), one of the founders of the American Chemical Society, and its president in 1880, and a fellow of the Boston Academy of Arts and Sciences. Benjamin Silliman, Jr., alluded to Genth as having "no superior in this country as an analytical chemist."

== Publications ==
Genth contributed many and careful analyses of minerals to the literature of chemistry. His name is associated with the ammonia cobalt bases which he discovered in 1846, and, in joint authorship with Wolcott Gibbs (1822–1908), he contributed to the "Smithsonian Contributions to Knowledge" a monograph on "Researches on the Ammonia-Cobalt Bases" (Washington, 1856).

Genth is the author of 102 separate papers on subjects in chemistry and mineralogy. Of these, about 30 were not related to mineralogy. Among the non-mineralogical papers were papers on fertilizers, which were related to his work for the Pennsylvania Board of Agriculture.

He also published "Tabellarische Übersicht der wichtigsten Reactionen welche Basen in Salzen zeigen" (Marburg, 1845), also the same in relation to "Acids" (1845); "Corundum" (in American Philosophical Society Proceedings, 1873); "Minerals of North Carolina," being appendix "C" of the Report on the Geology of North Carolina (Raleigh, 1875); also First and Second Preliminary Reports on the Mineralogy of Pennsylvania (Harrisburg, 1875/6), and Minerals and Mineral Localities of North Carolina (Raleigh, 1881).

== Minerals discovered and characterized ==
Genth was first to describe and characterize a number of new minerals, often ores of tellurium. Among those still recognized today are: melonite, calaverite, cosalite, schirmerite, coloradoite, montanite, kerrite, maconite, willcoxite, dudleyite, endlichite, landsfordite, nesquehonite, phosphuranylite, and penfieldite.

== Family ==
He married twice, the first time to Karolina Jäger (1847), with whom he had three children, the second time to Paulina Fischer (1852), with whom he had nine children.

He died in Philadelphia on February 2, 1893.
