= Magnesium bicarbonate =

- Magnesium bicarbonate

Names
- IUPAC name Magnesium hydrogencarbonate
- Other names Magnesium bicarbonate

Identifiers
CAS Number	2090-64-4
3D model (JSmol)	Interactive image; Interactive image
ChemSpider	92335
ECHA InfoCard	100.016.582
EC Number	218-240-1
E number	E504(ii) (acidity regulators, ...)
PubChem CID	102204
UNII	19E9A0647O
CompTox Dashboard (EPA)	DTXSID1062170
- InChI: InChI=1S/2CH2O3.Mg/c2*2-1(3)4;/h2*(H2,2,3,4);/q;;+2/p-2 Key: QWDJLDTYWNBUKE-UHFFFAOYSA-L
- SMILES: OC(=O)O[Mg]OC(=O)O; [Mg+2].OC([O-])=O.OC([O-])=O

Properties
Chemical formula	Mg(HCO_{3})_{2}
Molar mass	146.34 g/mol
Solubility in water	5.7 g / (100 mL)

Related compounds
Other cations	Calcium bicarbonate
- Except where otherwise noted, data are given for materials in their standard state (at 25 °C [77 °F], 100 kPa). verify (what is ?) Infobox references

Magnesium bicarbonate or magnesium hydrogencarbonate, Mg(HCO_{3})_{2}, is the bicarbonate salt of magnesium. It can be formed through the reaction of dilute solutions of carbonic acid (such as seltzer water) and magnesium hydroxide (milk of magnesia).

It can be prepared through the synthesis of magnesium acetate and sodium bicarbonate:

Mg(CH_{3}COO)_{2} + 2 NaHCO_{3} → Mg(HCO_{3})_{2} + 2 CH_{3}COONa

Magnesium bicarbonate exists only in aqueous solution. Magnesium does not form solid bicarbonate as does lithium. To produce it, a suspension of magnesium hydroxide is treated with pressurized carbon dioxide, producing a solution of magnesium bicarbonate:

Mg(OH)_{2} + 2 CO_{2} → Mg(HCO_{3})_{2}

Drying the resulting solution causes the magnesium bicarbonate to decompose, yielding magnesium carbonate, carbon dioxide, and water:

Mg^{2+} + 2 HCO_{3}^{−} → MgCO_{3} + CO_{2} + H_{2}O

If the drying is slow enough, the magnesium carbonate can be obtained in its crystalline form, Nesquehonite.
