= Coloradoite =

Rare telluride ore

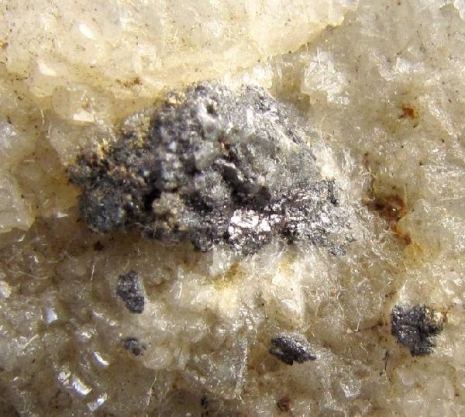
- Coloradoite from the La Plata District of Colorado

General
- Category: Telluride mineral
- Formula: HgTe
- IMA symbol: Clr
- Strunz classification: 2.CB.05a
- Crystal system: Cubic
- Crystal class: Hextetrahedral (4̅3m); H–M Symbol: (4̅ 3m)
- Space group: F4̅3m
- Unit cell: a = 6.453 Å; Z = 4

Identification
- Color: Iron-black inclining to gray
- Crystal habit: Massive, granular
- Fracture: Uneven to subconchordial
- Tenacity: Brittle
- Mohs scale hardness: 2.5
- Luster: Bright metallic
- Streak: Black
- Diaphaneity: Opaque
- Specific gravity: 8.10

Coloradoite, also known as mercury telluride (HgTe), is a rare telluride ore associated with metallic deposit (especially gold and silver). Gold usually occurs within tellurides, such as coloradoite, as a high-finess native metal.

The quest for mining led to the discovery of telluride ores which were found to be associated with metals. Tellurides are ingrown into ores containing these precious metals and are also responsible for a significant amount of these metals being produced. Coloradoite, a member of the coordination subclass of tellurides, is a covalent compound that is isostructural with sphalerite (ZnS). Its chemical properties are highly instrumental in distinguishing it from other tellurides. It was first discovered in Colorado in 1877. Since then, other deposits have been found. Although it plays an important role in the geology of minerals, it can also be used for other purposes.

== Introduction ==
Telluride ores occur mainly with metal deposits. In 1848, C.T. Jackson was the first to discover an American mineral containing the element tellurium in the Whitehall mine, in Spotsylvania County, near Fredericksburg, Virginia. Tellurides of gold were first discovered in 1782 in Transylvania and subsequently other telluride ores were found in other parts of the world (Mark and Scibird, 1908). The first discovery and description of coloradoite was by Frederick Augustus Genth in the Boulder veins of Colorado in 1877 and so named after the place of discovery. Other studies have reported its occurrence in other mines of the region and also in mines of the world's significant telluride locations. First classified in the 02 class of minerals by James Dana, its classification number is 02.08.02.05. It is also has a Strunz classification of 02.CB.05a, as a metal sulfide with gold, silver, iron, copper and other metals.

== Composition ==
The chemical formula for coloradoite is HgTe. Theoretically the composition (%) of HgTe is Hg 61.14, Te 38.86; Table 1 shows results from a chemical analyses reported by Vlasov on samples collected from two different locations. Because it is found with other telluride ores, it carries some other metals like gold and silver. In its pure form, it has the composition mentioned above. A little hard to identify, petzite which is hazardous could be mistaken for coloradoite, on the other hand, petzite is anisotropic as opposed to coloradoite being an isotropic mineral. It is a binary compound with the general formula AX.

Table 1. Results of chemical analyses of coloradoite (%)
Components	Kalgoorlie, Western Australia		Lakeshore, Ontario
Hg	60.95	61.62	58.55
Pb	-	-	1.60
Te	39.98	38.43	39.10
Insoluble residue	-	-	0.25
Total	100.33	100.05	99.50

== Structure ==
Coloradoite has a sphalerite structure also known as the "diamond" or "blende" structure; a face centered cubic array in which Hg^{2+} are in tetrahedral coordination with Te^{2−}, with a stacking sequence of ABCABC. The tetrahedra in the sphalerite group are joined through their apices and rotated through 60° with respect to each other. Figure 1 shows the atomic structure of coloradoite. The structure is a unit cube with the Te^{2−} ions at the corners and face centers. The four mercury atoms are coordinated so that each mercury atom lies at the center of a regular tetrahedron of tellurium atoms and each tellurium lies at the center of a regular tetrahedron of mercury atoms. Its crystal point group of 4̅3m and space group is F4̅3m. It is a covalent compound with a high proportion of metallic bonding, due to its low valencies and even lower interatomic distances. It is also isotropic, meaning it has just one refractive index.

== Physical properties ==
Coloradoite is a brittle, massively granular mineral, with a hardness of 2.5. It has a metallic luster, which could be explained by the presence of metallic bonding in the crystal. Its specific gravity is 8.10 and is an opaque mineral with colors iron-black inclining to gray; in polished sections, and white with slight grayish brown tint, tarnishing to dull purple. Its fracture is uneven to subconchordial with a cell length of 6.44 angstroms. For ease of identification, its etching tests are as follows; With HNO_{3} it slowly produces a weak brown variegated deposit that acts as a protector to the surface and can be removed completely; with aqua regia it effervesces and produces a weak deposit that can be rubbed off and white, radiating spherules are formed, reaction with FeCl_{3} yields a browning of the surface at different rates and produces black rims of droplet. Reactions with HCl, KCN, KOH and HgCl_{2} yield no precipitates or residue as opposed to petzite which turns dark brown with HNO_{3}.

== Geologic occurrence ==
Coloradoite was first discovered in 1877 by F. A. Genth, from the Smuggler Mine at Balarat and the Keystone and Mountain Lion mines of the Magnolia district in Colorado; it was named after the state it was found in. Later studies showed its existence in other mines of the region as well as Kalgoorlie, Australia and Kirkland Lake District, Canada. It is found in large quantities in ores made up of intergrown tellurium, calaverite or sylvanite, melonite and altaite, as anhedral grains either enclosed in single crystals of tellurium or localized along grain boundaries in tellurium aggregates, among others. The tectonic settings for ore deposits are; (a) Magmatic deposits (Waarkraal, South Africa) (b) Contact metasomatic (Nickel Plate mine, British Columbia, (c) Lode and Massive replacement deposits (Kirkland Lake, Ontario and South Dakota, respectively), and (d) Cavity filling (Cripple Creek, Colorado, Kalgoorlie, Australia). Tellurides are accountable for just about 20% of gold production and gold mineralization is hosted chiefly by Archean-aged dolerites and basalts that have been metamorphosed to the greenschist facies. This mineralization occurs in hundreds of auriferous and telluride-bearing lodes.
