= Lansfordite =

Pentahydrated magnesium carbonate

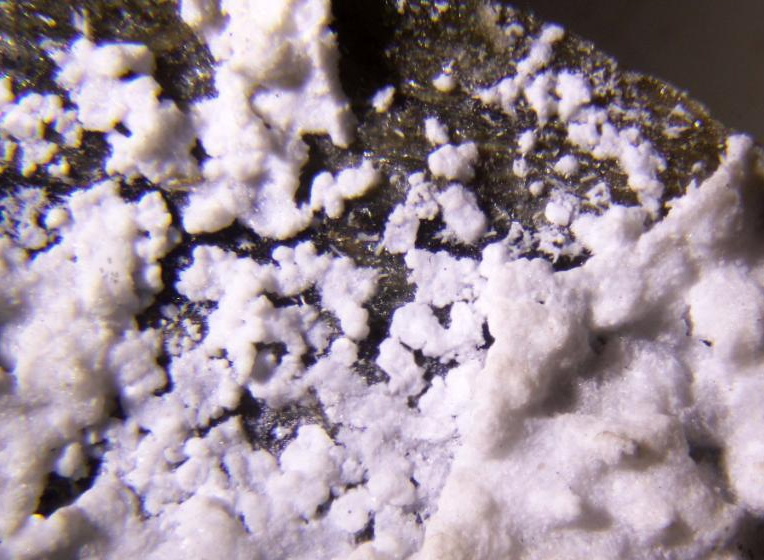
- Lansfordite crystals in Switzerland

General
- Category: Carbonates
- Formula: MgCO_{3}·5H_{2}O
- IMA symbol: Lfd
- Strunz classification: 5/D.01-30
- Dana classification: 15.1.6.1
- Crystal system: Monoclinic
- Space group: P2_{1}/c (No. 14)
- Unit cell: a=7.3458 Å, b=7.6232 Å, c=12.4737 Å, β=101.722°

Identification
- Formula mass: 174.39
- Colour: Colourless, white after exposure
- Crystal habit: Crystals, stalactites terminated by crystal faces, efflorescences, parallel growths.
- Cleavage: Perfect, Distinct
- Mohs scale hardness: 2.5
- Luster: Vitreous (if fresh)
- Streak: White
- Diaphaneity: Translucent, opaque after exposure
- Specific gravity: 1.6
- Density: 1.6
- Birefringence: 0.042

Lansfordite is a mineral of magnesium carbonate (MgCO_{3}). It represents the pentahydrate of magnesium carbonate, and has the total formula MgCO_{3}·5H_{2}O. Landsfordite was discovered in 1888 in a coal mine in Lansford, Pennsylvania. It crystallizes in the monoclinic system (space group P2_{1}/c) and typically occurs as colorless to white prismatic crystals and stalactitic masses. It is a soft mineral, Mohs hardness of 2.5, with a low specific gravity of 1.7. It is transparent to translucent with refractive indices of 1.46 to 1.51. The mineral will effloresce at room temperature, producing nesquehonite.
