= Phosphuranylite =

Uranyl phosphate mineral

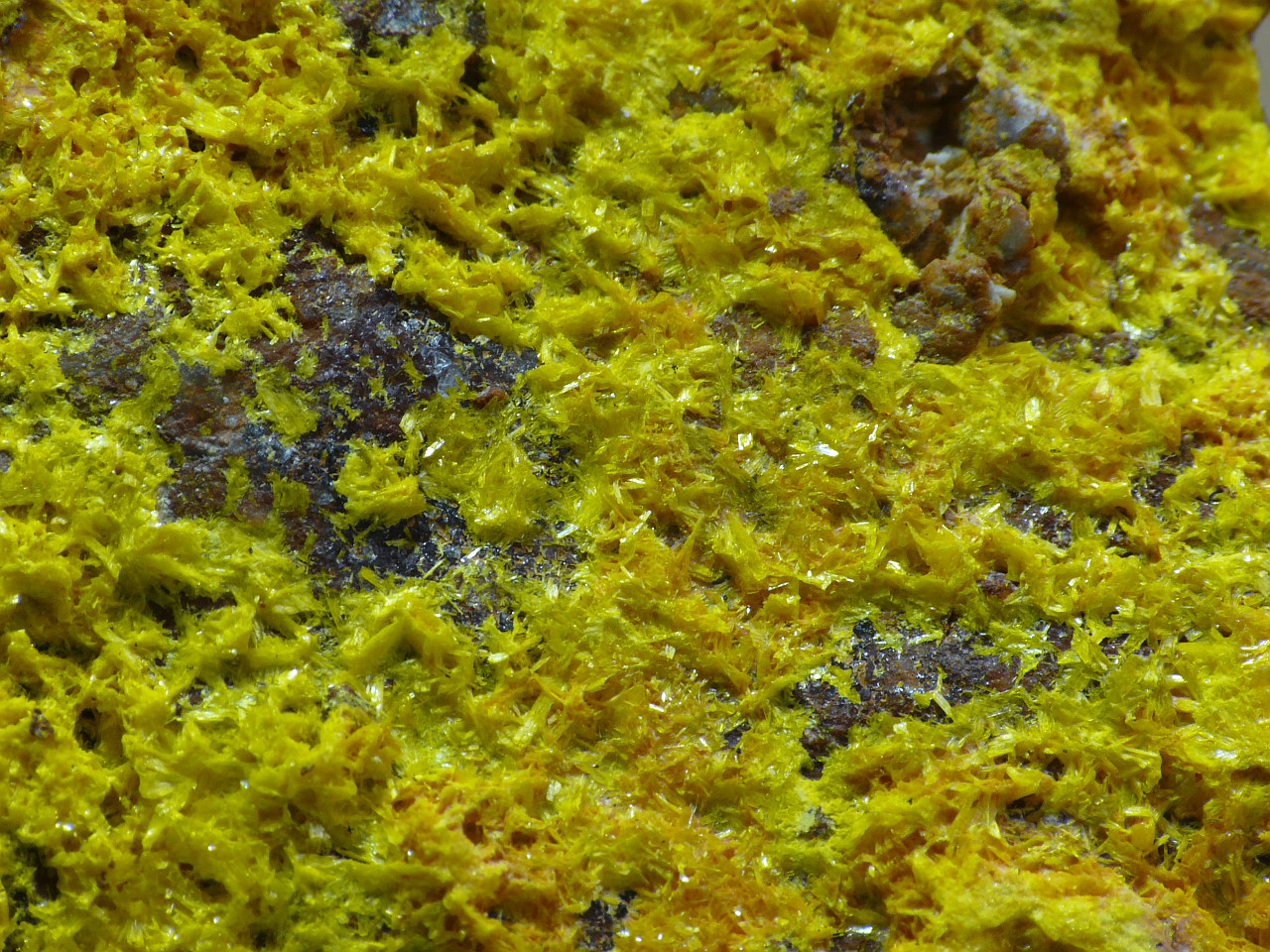
- Phosphuranylite from South Alligator River, Northern Territory, Australia (10 mm field of view)

General
- Category: Phosphate minerals
- Formula: KCa(H_{3}O)_{3}(UO_{2})_{7}(PO_{4})_{4}O_{4}·8(H_{2}O)
- IMA symbol: Puy
- Strunz classification: 8.EC.10
- Crystal system: Orthorhombic
- Crystal class: Dipyramidal (mmm); H-M symbol: (2/m 2/m 2/m)
- Space group: Cmcm

Identification
- Other characteristics: Radioactive

Phosphuranylite is a uranyl phosphate mineral with formula KCa(H_{3}O)_{3}(UO_{2})_{7}(PO_{4})_{4}O_{4}·8(H_{2}O).

It was first described in 1879 by Frederick Augustus Genth, from an occurrence in the Flat Rock pegmatite in Mitchell County, North Carolina, US.
