= Mesoporous magnesium carbonate =

Family of magnesium carbonate materials

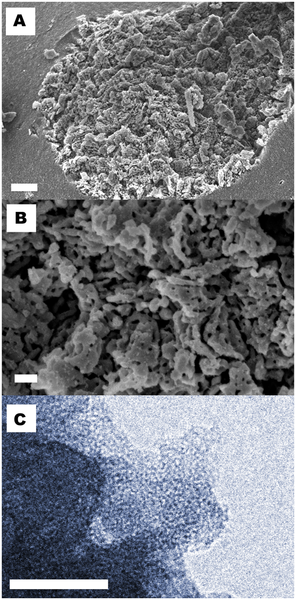
Electron microscopy images of a mesoporous magnesium carbonate – scale bar length: (A) 1 μm (B) 200 nm (C) 50 nm

Mesoporous magnesium carbonates (MMCs) constitute a family of magnesium carbonate materials with high specific surface areas. It was first reported in July 2013 by a group of researchers in nanotechnology at Uppsala University. The highest reported surface area of any MMC is 800 m² per gram, which is the highest surface area ever measured for an alkali earth metal carbonate. The average pore size of MMCs can be adjusted by tuning the synthesis conditions. So far, all reported forms of MMCs are anhydrous and amorphous.

As with other types of mesoporous materials, the large surface area and the nanometer sized pores make MMCs interesting in a number of applications. In addition, MMCs have excellent adsorptive capabilities.

The pores are formed via expanding CO_{2} gas during synthesis, no other templating molecules are needed to form the mesoporous network in the material. The first patent on MMCs was granted in 2017, and it is now being commercialized by the spin-out company Disruptive Materials AB in Uppsala, Sweden, for applications within cosmetics, sport products and other technical areas. MMCs is also being investigated within pharmaceutical applications.

== Naming ==
In the first publications on mesoporous magnesium carbonate, the material was given the name Upsalite as a reference to Uppsala University and the city of Uppsala, using the Latin spelling with one p. Today, Upsalite is a registered trademark, and in general the material class is designated as mesoporous magnesium carbonates.

== Synthesis ==
The general type of MMC is synthesized by reacting magnesium oxide (MgO) and methanol under a carbon dioxide (CO_{2}) pressure. Stirring and depressurization of the product results in an alcogel that swells as CO_{2} gas expands and is released. When physically bound CO_{2} is released, and residual methanol is evaporated from the gel upon heat treatment at moderate temperatures, the gel solidifies, and a porous network is formed in the material. The average pore diameter in the final product can be controlled by adjusting the energy input during the solidification process.

== Structure ==
MMCs are composed of an X-ray amorphous and mesoporous MgCO_{3} matrix with crystals of MgO embedded in the structure. The synthesis route described above generally produces MMC particles in the millimetre to centimetre range, particles that can be reduced in size if desired.

== Pharmaceutical applications ==
MMCs have been shown to successfully increase the apparent solubility of several poorly soluble model drugs, including Ibuprofen, itraconacole, tolfenamic, rimonabant, celecoxib, cinnarizine and griseofulvin. They do so by suppressing crystallization of the drug substance incorporated into the pores of the materials. Amorphous drugs generally exhibit higher solubilities than their crystalline counterparts, and by stabilizing drugs in their amorphous state in the drug formulation, a higher solubility can be obtained at administration. Poor aqueous solubility limits the bioavailability of many drugs, and thus their therapeutic effect.

The release of drugs from MMCs can be tuned via particle size and pore size. The release rate can also be tuned via chemical modification of the pore walls. It has been shown that supersaturation of drugs formulated with MMCs can be enhanced, both in terms of drug solubility and time-period for supersaturation, by addition of the polymers during release.

== Sports ==
Due to its ability to adsorb moisture, MMCs can be used by climbers and other athletes to enhance grip. MMC under the brand name Upsalite, was introduced on the global market as an ingredient in climbing chalk, in 2018 by the company Black Diamond. When first presented on the world's largest sports exhibit ISPO, it was awarded best new and innovative climbing accessory 2018.

== Humidity control ==
As MMCs are found to adsorb more water at low relative humidities compared to the best materials previously available, the hygroscopic zeolites, and MMCs can be used to keep humidity at extremely low levels where needed. Further, upsalite can release that water at lower temperatures than zeolites, requiring less energy for regeneration.

== Other potential uses ==
MMC can also be potentially used for collection of toxic waste, chemicals or oil spills and for odor control, sanitation after fires, and the collection of water from diverse sources.
