= Dypingite =

Magnesium hydroxycarbonate hydrate

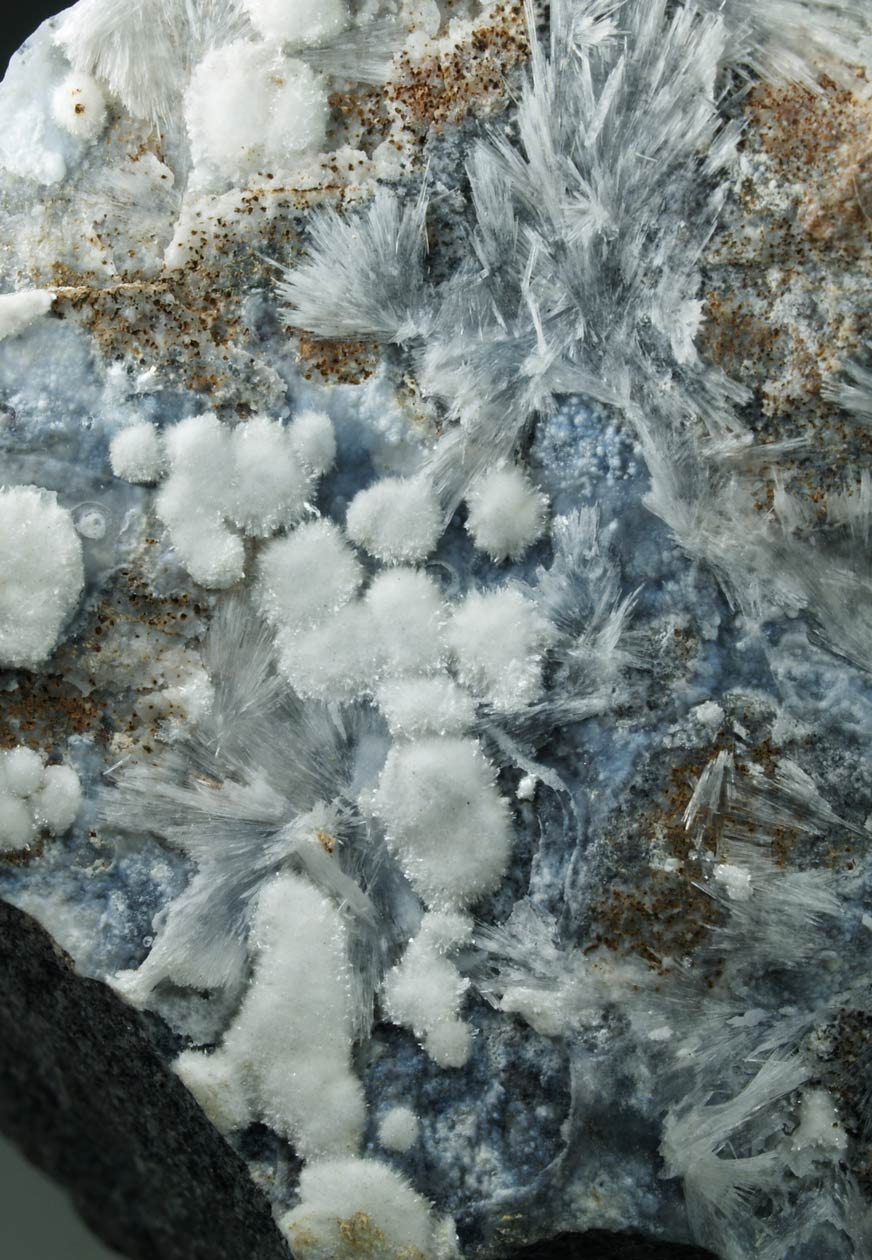
- Dypingite (white rosettes) with other minerals, from Pedrera de l'Àngel, Montseny Massif, Gualba, Barcelona, Spain

General
- Category: Carbonate minerals
- Formula: Mg_{5}(CO_{3})_{4}(OH)_{2}·5H_{2}O
- Strunz classification: 5.DA.05
- Dana classification: 16b.07.02.01
- Crystal system: Monoclinic; Unknown space group

Identification
- Formula mass: 485.65 g/mol
- Color: White
- Crystal habit: Globular – spherical to rounded forms (e.g. wavellite)
- Tenacity: Brittle
- Luster: Pearly
- Streak: White to grey
- Diaphaneity: Semitransparent
- Specific gravity: 2.15
- Optical properties: Biaxial (+)
- Refractive index: n_{α} = 1.508 n_{β} = 1.510 n_{γ} = 1.516
- Birefringence: δ = 0.0080
- Pleochroism: Colorless
- Ultraviolet fluorescence: Fluorescent and phosphorescent: Short-wave UV = grey blue, Long-wave UV = light blue

Dypingite is a hydrated magnesium carbonate mineral with the formula: Mg_{5}(CO_{3})_{4}(OH)_{2}·5H_{2}O. Its type locality is the Dypingdal serpentine-magnesite deposit, Snarum, Norway. Synthetic dypingite is known as heavy magnesium carbonate.

It is found in the hardened cement paste of low-CO_{2} footprint MgO-cements after their hydration.
