= Hydromagnesite =

Hydrated hydroxy-carbonate mineral of magnesium

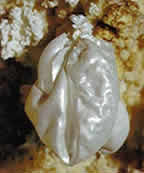
- Hydromagnesite balloon in Jewel Cave

General
- Category: Carbonate mineral
- Formula: Mg_{5}(CO_{3})_{4}(OH)_{2}·4H_{2}O
- IMA symbol: Hmgs
- Strunz classification: 5.DA.05
- Dana classification: 16b.07.01.01
- Crystal system: Monoclinic
- Crystal class: Prismatic (2/m) (same H-M symbol)
- Space group: P2_{1}/c

Identification
- Formula mass: 467.64 g/mol
- Color: Colorless, white
- Crystal habit: Acicular and as encrustations; pseudo-orthorhombic
- Twinning: Polysynthetic lamellar on {100}
- Cleavage: {010} Perfect, {100} Distinct
- Fracture: Uneven
- Tenacity: Brittle
- Mohs scale hardness: 3.5
- Luster: Vitreous, silky, pearly, earthy
- Streak: White
- Diaphaneity: Transparent to translucent
- Specific gravity: 2.16–2.2
- Optical properties: Biaxial (+)
- Refractive index: n_{α} = 1.523 n_{β} = 1.527 n_{γ} = 1.545
- Birefringence: δ = 0.022
- Ultraviolet fluorescence: Fluorescent, short UV=green, long UV=bluish white.

Hydromagnesite is a hydrated magnesium carbonate mineral with the formula Mg_{5}(CO_{3})_{4}(OH)_{2}·4H_{2}O.

It generally occurs associated with the weathering products of magnesium containing minerals such as serpentine or brucite. It occurs as incrustations and vein or fracture fillings in ultramafic rocks and serpentinites, and occurs in hydrothermally altered dolomite and marble. Hydromagnesite commonly appears in caves as speleothems and "moonmilk", deposited from water that has seeped through magnesium rich rocks. It is the most common cave carbonate after calcite and aragonite. The mineral thermally decomposes, over a temperature range of approximately 220 °C to 550 °C, releasing water and carbon dioxide leaving a magnesium oxide residue.

Hydromagnesite was first described in 1836 for an occurrence in Hoboken, New Jersey.

Stromatolites in an alkaline (pH greater than 9) freshwater lake (Salda Gölü) in southern Turkey are made of hydromagnesite precipitated by diatoms and cyanobacteria.

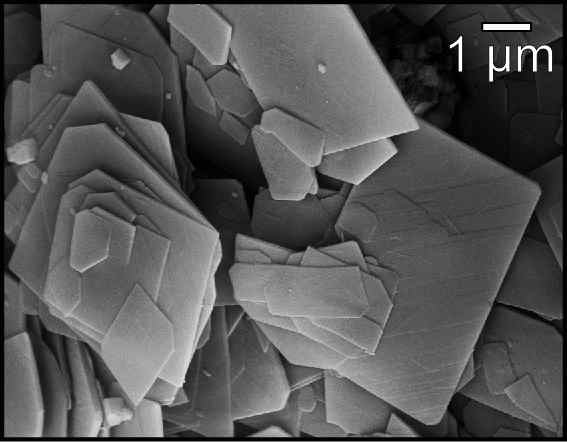
SEM micrograph of hydromagnesite showing platy crystal morphology. Sample was collected from the hydromagnesite-magnesite playas near Atlin, British Columbia, Canada.

Microbial deposition of hydromagnesite is also reported from playas in British Columbia. The hydromagnesite-magnesite playas near Atlin, British Columbia are some of the most studied deposits of hydromagnesite. These deposits have been characterized in the context of a biogeochemical model for CO_{2} sequestration.

One of the largest deposits of hydromagnesite exists in Greece. It consists of a natural mixture with huntite. Local people have used the white mineral as a source of material for whitewashing buildings for centuries. In the mid 20th century the minerals, ground to a fine powder, found use as a filler for rubber shoe soles. The locals used the granite mills designed for grinding wheat. Commercial exploitation of the minerals began in the late 70s and early 80s with the mineral being exported worldwide. The Greek deposit is still operated commercially, although the world's largest commercially operated reserves are in Turkey.

== Uses ==
Its most common industrial use is as a mixture with huntite as a flame retardant or fire retardant additive for polymers. Hydromagnesite decomposes endothermically, giving off water and carbon dioxide, leaving a magnesium oxide residue. The initial decomposition begins at about 220 °C making it ideal for use as a filler in polymers and giving it certain advantages over the most commonly used fire retardant, aluminium hydroxide. Syntheic hydromagnesite is known as light magnesium carbonate due to its low bulk density.

== Thermal decomposition ==
Hydromagnesite thermally decomposes in three stages releasing water and carbon dioxide.

The first stage starting at about 220 °C, is the release of the four molecules of water of crystallisation. This is followed at about 330 °C by the decomposition of the hydroxide ion to a further molecule of water. Finally, at about 350 °C carbon dioxide begins to be released. The release of the carbon dioxide can be further broken down into two stages depending on the rate of heating.
