= Nesquehonite =

Trihydrated magnesium carbonate

General
- Category: Carbonates
- Formula: MgCO_{3}·3H_{2}O
- IMA symbol: Nes
- Strunz classification: 5.CA.05
- Dana classification: 13.1.5.1
- Crystal system: Monoclinic
- Space group: P2_{1}/m
- Unit cell: a=7.705 Å, b=5.367 Å, c=12.121 Å, β=90.451°

Identification
- Colour: Colourless
- Cleavage: Perfect
- Mohs scale hardness: 2.5
- Luster: Vitreous (if fresh)
- Diaphaneity: Translucent
- Specific gravity: 1.824-1.854
- Density: 1.6
- Birefringence: 0.114

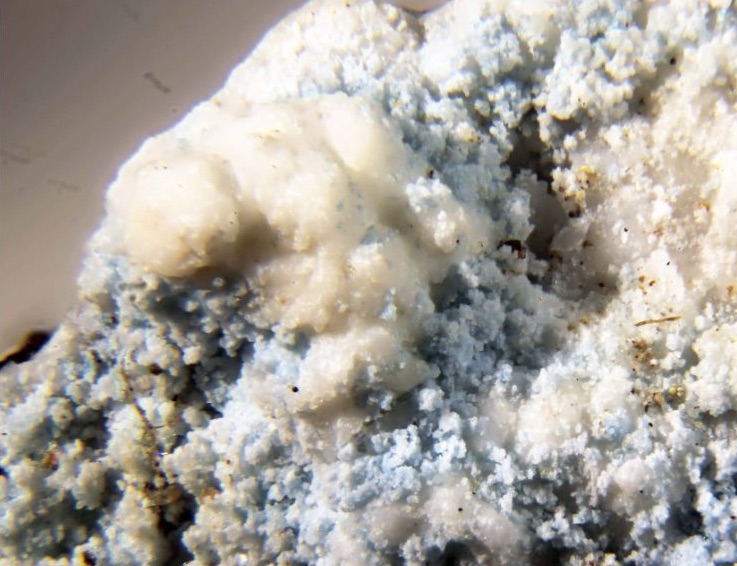
Colorless crystal aggregates of nesquehonite together with an unknown pale blue mineral, possibly cuprian nesquehonite.

A lab grown Nesquehonite crystal formed by slow decomposition of aqueous magnesium bicarbonate.

Nesquehonite is a mineral of magnesium carbonate (MgCO_{3}). It represents the trihydrate of magnesium carbonate, and has the total formula MgCO_{3}·3H_{2}O. It was described in 1890 by F. A. Genth and S. L. Penfield and is named after its type locality of Nesquehoning, Pennsylvania, where it was sampled from a coal mine. Nesquehonite can form from the related pentahydrate Lansfordite by dehydration at room temperature.
