= Calcium bicarbonate =

Chemical compound existing only in aqueous solution (Ca(HCO3)2)

- Calcium bicarbonate

Names
- IUPAC name Calcium hydrogencarbonate
- Systematic IUPAC name Calcium bicarbonate
- Other names Cleansing lime Bicarbonate of lime Rain salt

Identifiers
CAS Number	3983-19-5
3D model (JSmol)	Interactive image; Interactive image
ChemSpider	8351767
PubChem CID	10176262
UNII	7PRA4BLM2L
CompTox Dashboard (EPA)	DTXSID50893964
- InChI: InChI=1S/2CH2O3.Ca/c2*2-1(3)4;/h2*(H2,2,3,4);/q;;+2/p-2 Key: NKWPZUCBCARRDP-UHFFFAOYSA-L; InChI=1/2CH2O3.Ca/c2*2-1(3)4;/h2*(H2,2,3,4);/q;;+2/p-2 Key: NKWPZUCBCARRDP-NUQVWONBAN
- SMILES: OC(=O)O[Ca]OC(=O)O; [Ca+2].[O-]C(=O)O.[O-]C(=O)O

Properties
Chemical formula	Ca(HCO_{3})_{2}
Molar mass	162.11464 g·mol^{-1}
Solubility in water	unknown

Hazards
- Occupational safety and health (OHS/OSH)
Main hazards	Irritant
Flash point	Non-flammable

Related compounds
Other cations	Magnesium bicarbonate
Related compounds	Sodium bicarbonate
- Except where otherwise noted, data are given for materials in their standard state (at 25 °C [77 °F], 100 kPa). verify (what is ?) Infobox references

Calcium bicarbonate, also called calcium hydrogencarbonate, has the chemical formula Ca(HCO_{3})_{2}. The term does not refer to a known solid compound; it exists only in aqueous solution containing calcium (Ca^{2+}), bicarbonate (HCO^{−}_{3}), and carbonate (CO^{2−}_{3}) ions, together with dissolved carbon dioxide (CO_{2}). The relative concentrations of these carbon-containing species depend on the pH; bicarbonate predominates within the range 6.36–10.25 in fresh water.

All waters in contact with the atmosphere absorb carbon dioxide, and as these waters come into contact with rocks and sediments they acquire metal ions, most commonly calcium and magnesium, so most natural waters that come from streams, lakes, and especially wells, can be regarded as dilute solutions of these bicarbonates. These hard waters tend to form carbonate scale in pipes and boilers, and they react with soaps to form an undesirable scum.

Attempts to prepare compounds such as solid calcium bicarbonate by evaporating its solution to dryness invariably yield instead the solid calcium carbonate:

Ca(HCO_{3})_{2}(aq) → CO_{2}(g) + H_{2}O(l) + CaCO_{3}(s).

Very few solid bicarbonates other than those of the alkali metals and ammonium bicarbonate are known to exist.

The above reaction is very important to the formation of stalactites, stalagmites, columns, and other speleothems within caves, and for that matter, in the formation of the caves themselves. As water containing carbon dioxide (including extra CO_{2} acquired from soil organisms) passes through limestone or other calcium carbonate-containing minerals, it dissolves part of the calcium carbonate, hence becomes richer in bicarbonate. As the groundwater enters the cave, the excess carbon dioxide is released from the solution of the bicarbonate, causing the much less soluble calcium carbonate to be deposited.

In the reverse process, dissolved carbon dioxide (CO_{2}) in rainwater (H_{2}O) reacts with limestone calcium carbonate (CaCO_{3}) to form soluble calcium bicarbonate (Ca(HCO_{3})_{2}). This soluble compound is then washed away with the rainwater. This form of weathering is called carbonation and carbonatation.

In medicine, calcium bicarbonate is sometimes administered intravenously to immediately correct the cardiac depressor effects of hyperkalemia by increasing calcium concentration in serum, and at the same time, correcting the acid usually present.
