= Dudleyite =

Mineral

General
- Category: Minerals

Identification
- Color: Soft bronze or brownish-yellow
- Luster: Pearly

Dudleyite is a mineral named after Dudleyville, Alabama. It is a hydrous mica, that came from margarite. It is founded in both Dudleyville and the Cullakenee Mine.
