= Silver mining in the United States =

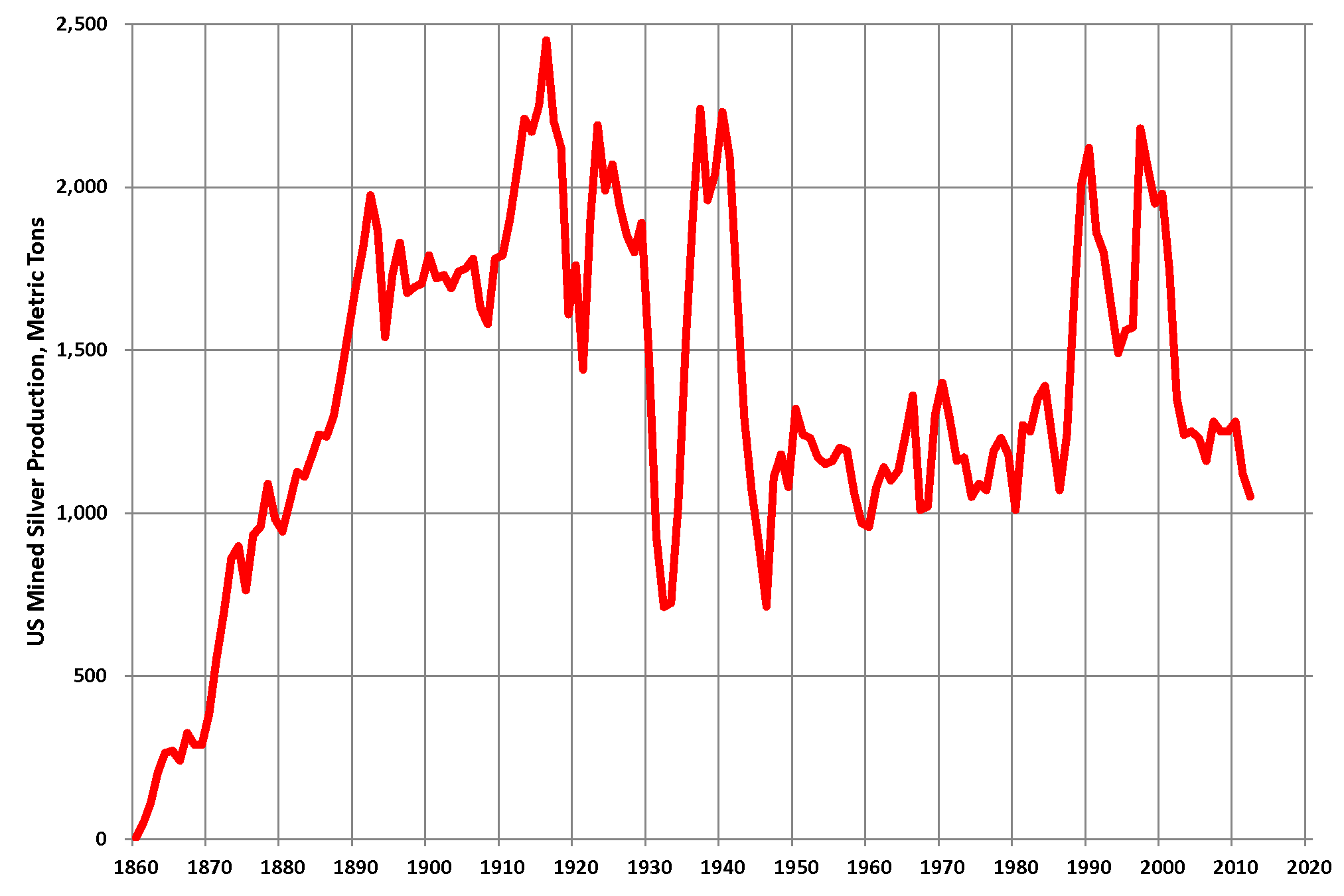
Annual US mined silver production.

Silver mining in the United States began on a major scale with the discovery of the Comstock Lode in Nevada in 1858. The industry suffered after the demonetization of silver in 1873 by the Coinage Act of 1873.

United States mines produced 1,100 tons of silver in 2024, making up approximately 4.4% of the worldwide production of silver. Four US mines had silver as their primary product, and 31 mines reported silver as a byproduct of gold and base metals production. Alaska was the country's leading silver-producing state, followed by Idaho.

Interest in silver mining has increased in recent years because of an increased price for the metal: the average silver price increased from $4.39 per troy ounce in 2001, to $13.45 per troy ounce in 2007. In 2011, silver prices rose to almost $49 per troy ounce in April before dropping to around $34 per troy ounce in late June. In March 2016, the silver price was around $15 per troy ounce.

== By state ==
=== Alaska ===
In 2015, Alaska was the nation's leading silver-producing state. Two Alaska mines were significant silver producers. The Greens Creek mine, owned by Hecla Mining, produced 8,452,153 troy ounces of silver. Teck Resources' Red Dog mine, the world's largest source of zinc, in 2014 produced 7.56 million troy ounces of silver as a byproduct of lead and zinc production.

=== Arizona ===
More than 80% of the state's silver was a byproduct of copper mining; other silver came as a byproduct of lead, zinc, and gold mining. The most productive silver district in Arizona that was mined primarily for silver was Tombstone in Cochise County, discovered in 1877. In 2006, all the silver mined in Arizona came as a byproduct of copper mining.

=== California ===
Most of the silver produced in California has been a byproduct of mining other metals, such as copper (Copperopolis), tungsten (Pine Creek mine in Inyo County), or gold (Randsburg). However, there have been mines where silver was the principal product.

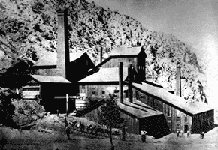
Panamint City, California

Silver mines at Panamint in Inyo County produced silver from 1873 until the town was destroyed by a flash flood in 1876.

The Cerro Gordo Mines in Inyo County started producing lead and silver in 1860. Ore bodies were replacements and fissure fillings in Paleozoic limestone. In the 20th century zinc became the principal product.

Silver was discovered at Calico in San Bernardino County in 1881, and mining was prosecuted strongly there until 1896.

Silver was discovered in 1919 in the eastern Rand district, near Randsburg and Johannesburg, in San Bernardino County. The Rand district had already been an established gold district. The Kelly Rand mine produced silver from miargyrite and pyrargyrite ores from 1919 to 1928.

=== Colorado ===
Silver veins were first discovered in the Montezuma district of Summit County in 1864. Despite the early silver discoveries, Colorado's largest silver district, Leadville, was not discovered until 1874.

The largest current source of silver in Colorado is as a byproduct of gold mining at the Cripple Creek & Victor mine, a large open-pit heap leach operation owned by AngloGold Ashanti at Victor, Colorado. In 2006, the mine produced 4.0 metric tons (130,000 ounces) of silver.

=== Idaho ===
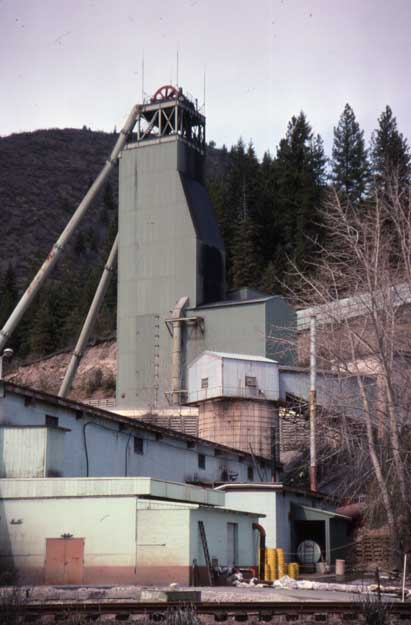
Lucky Friday mine, Coeur d’Alene district.

The Coeur d’Alene (Silver Valley) district of Shoshone County in northern Idaho has produced more silver than any other mining district in the United States, and is historically one of the top three silver districts in the world in total silver produced. (It competes with Potosi in Bolivia and Pachuca-Real del Monte in Mexico for the title of greatest silver district, each having produced more than a billion troy ounces of silver.) Through 2006, the Coeur d’Alene district has produced a total of more than 37,000 metric tons (1.2 billion ounces) of silver.

Two silver mines are currently operating in the Coeur d’Alene district: the Lucky Friday mine, the third largest in the US, owned by Hecla Mining Company; and the Galena Complex, owned by Americas Gold & Silver, which consists of the Galena mine and the Coeur mine. The Lucky Friday mine produced 3.0 million troy ounces of silver in 2015; the Galena mine produced approximately 1.54 million troy ounces of silver in 2015.

=== Missouri ===
Silver mining began in 1879 at the Einstein mine, nine miles northwest of Fredericktown in Madison County. The settlement of Silver Mine, complete with US Post Office was established to serve the miners of the Einstein, Ozark, and Apex mines. The mines closed within a few years, but reopened briefly in 1916 and again in 1927 to mine tungsten.

=== Montana ===
Butte, Montana is historically the second-greatest source of silver in the United States, second only to the Coeur d’Alene district in Idaho. Butte started as a placer gold camp in 1864, and the placers were exhausted by 1867. But in 1874 prospectors discovered silver veins. Butte flourished as a silver-mining district until miners tunneled into large copper veins in 1882. From then until the 1980s, Butte was primarily a copper-mining district, but with a lot of silver as a byproduct. Butte produced more than 716 million troy ounces (22,300 mt) of silver through 2005.

Silver was discovered at Phillipsburg in 1864, and the district was one of the most prolific silver producers in Montana. Major mines included the Granite Mountain mine, the Bi-Metallic mine, and the Hope mine. In 1887, the district produced 2.2 million troy ounces (68 metric tons) of silver, making it the largest silver producer in the US for that year. The district suffered greatly from the fall in the price of silver in 1893, and remained moribund until World War I, when the manganese deposits of the district became valuable, and Philipsburg became one of the top US producers of that metal. Silver occurs in veins filling fracture zones through Paleozoic limestone. Minerals in the silver-ore veins include polybasite, pyrargyrite, proustite, sphalerite, galena, and tennantite. Manganese occurs as replacement bodies of pyrolusite and rhodochrosite in limestone adjacent to the fracture zones. No mines are presently active in the district.

=== Nevada ===
The discovery of the Comstock Lode in 1858 inaugurated large-scale silver mining in the United States. The Comstock was the first important silver-mining district in the United States, and its discovery stimulated a great deal of prospecting for silver across the Great Basin area of the United States. The resulting silver rush led to many other silver discoveries in Nevada, including El Dorado Canyon (1861), Austin (1862), Eureka (1864), and Pioche (1869).

The Rochester Mine is the only operating primary silver producer in Nevada and the second largest in the US (after the Greens Creek mine in Alaska). In 2015 it produced 4.6 million ounces of silver and 52,588 ounces of gold from an open pit and heap leaching operation. Nevada produces a larger amount of silver, 6,744,703 ounces in 2014, as a byproduct of the mining of gold.

=== New Hampshire ===
Silver-bearing galena was mined from three districts in New Hampshire.

The Silver Lake mine near Madison in Carroll County operated intermittently from 1826 to 1918. Ore was extracted from underground workings until 1915, when a small open pit was dug.

The Mascot mine and the Shelburne mine worked veins in schist and granite on Mount Hayes, between Gorham and Shelburne in Coos County. The Shelburne mine operated intermittently from the 1830s into the 1850s; a final attempt at mining took place in 1880. The Mascot mine worked from 1881 to 1885 and in 1906.

The North Woodstock mine, near the town of the same name in Grafton County, apparently mined and milled lead-silver ore, although no production records are known.

=== New Mexico ===
No silver is known to have been mined in New Mexico prior to the silver discovery in 1863 near Magdalena in Socorro County. The major silver-mining area of Silver City in Grant County was discovered in 1866.

A rancher found the Lake Valley silver deposits in Sierra County in 1876. The deposits are bedded manto-type deposits in Paleozoic limestone. The mines, promoted by Whitaker Wright, produced well for a few years after miners tunneled into a silver-lined cavity they named the "bridal chamber" that alone yielded 2.5 million troy ounces (78 metric tons) of silver. But no more bridal chambers were discovered, the mines struggled and were worked periodically into the 20th century. The district produced manganese during World Wars I and II. Total production of the Lake Valley district through 1931 was 5.8 million ounces (180 metric tons) of silver.

Almost all the silver produced today in New Mexico comes as a byproduct from the two large open-pit copper mines in southwest New Mexico.

=== North Carolina ===
The Silver Hill mine in Davidson County, also known as the King mine and the Washington mine, was discovered in 1838. Excluding Mexican silver mines in land later acquired by the US, the Silver Hill mine was the first silver mine in the United States. It produced silver, gold, lead, copper, and zinc intermittently from its discovery until the mid-1870s.

=== Oklahoma ===
Copper and silver occur in a sandstone roll-front-type deposit in the Wellington sandstone of Permian age at Paoli, Garvin County, Oklahoma. About 1900, several wagon loads of ore were shipped from the deposit.

=== Oregon ===
Most silver in Oregon was produced as a byproduct of gold and copper mining. Two mines operated primarily for their silver were the Bay Horse mine in Baker County, which produced 125,000 ounces (3.9 metric tons) of silver, and the Oregon King mine in Jefferson County, which produced 300,000 ounces (9.3 metric tons) of silver.

=== Pennsylvania ===
The Pequea silver mine near Conestoga in Lancaster County was worked from before the Revolutionary War to 1875. A minor amount of mining was done about 1900. The ore is silver-bearing galena in the Cambrian Vintage Dolomite. Production is unknown.

=== Texas ===
The Allamoore-Van Horn silver-mining district in Hudspeth County and Culberson counties was discovered in 1880, and mined intermittently. Silver and copper were mined from Precambrian igneous and sedimentary rocks. No reliable production figures are available.

Silver mineralization was discovered in 1880 or 1881 in Presidio County, Texas. Mining began in 1883 at what became the town of Shafter. At least six mines were worked. The deposits are manto-type deposits in Permian limestone of the Mina Grande formation, related to an igneous intrusive. Silver minerals include argentite and native silver. Associated minerals include the lead minerals anglesite and galena, the zinc minerals sphalerite, hemimorphite, and smithsonite, and gangue minerals quartz, calcite, goethite, and dolomite. Total production to 1999 was 35 million troy ounces (1090 metric tons) of silver, along with some gold. Aurcana Corp. of Vancouver has announced plans to reopen the silver mine.

=== Utah ===
The beginning of silver mining was delayed in Utah, due to its remote location. The completion of the transcontinental railroad spurred prospecting in Utah, and led to major silver discoveries.

The first mining claim in the Park City district was staked in 1868, and the first ore shipment made in 1871. Prominent mines included the Flagstaff mine, Ontario mine, and Silver King mine. Ore occurs in veins and replacement deposits in sedimentary and igneous rocks.

The Horn Silver Mine was discovered in 1870 with the first discovery of significant value occurring in 1875. On September 24 of that year, Samuel Hawks (or Hawke) and James Ryan uncovered silver-bearing rock at the Horn Silver Ledge in what later became the San Francisco mining district near Milford, Utah. Significant mining began the next year. By 1882, the Horn Silver Mine was the largest silver producer in the world.

The Little Cottonwood district came into prominence in the 1870s with large ore shipments from the Emma Silver Mine, the Flagstaff Mine, the Emily Mine, and others.

Silver ore was found in sandstone formations in the Silver Reef district in 1866, although large-scale mining operations did not begin until 1875.

Today almost all the silver produced in Utah comes from the Bingham Canyon Mine, which produces silver as a byproduct of copper mining.

- Utah History to Go: Silver in the Beehive State

=== Virginia ===
Virginia has produced about 90 thousand ounces of silver as a byproduct of mining other metals.

=== Washington ===
The Chewelah district in Stevens County produced 1.7 million troy ounces (53 metric tons) of silver and 5,000 metric tons of copper from quartz-carbonate veins. Chalcopyrite is the principal ore mineral. The deposits are hosted in shear zones in argillite of the Precambrian Belt Supergroup. Silver-mining stocks were a mainstay of the Spokane Stock Exchange.

== See also ==
- Silver mining
  - Silver rush
