= Pearceite =

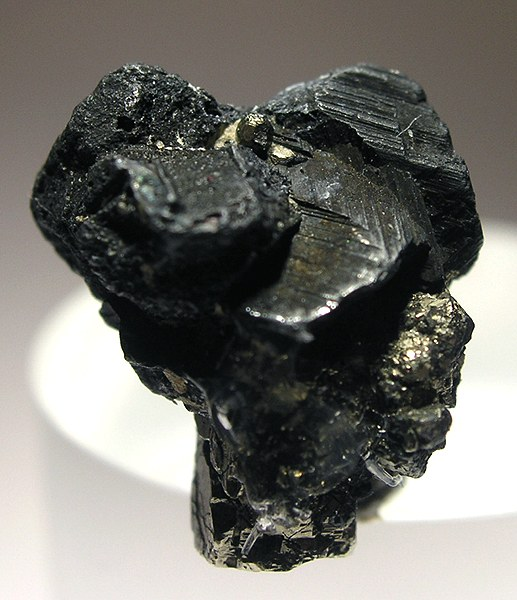
- Pearceite from Butte, Montana, US

General
- Category: Minerals
- Formula: Cu(Ag,Cu)_{6}Ag_{9}As_{2}S_{11}
- IMA symbol: Pea
- Strunz classification: 2.GB.15 (10 ed); 2/E.05-20 (8 ed)
- Dana classification: 3.1.8.1
- Crystal system: Monoclinic or trigonal
- Space group: P3̅m1 (no. 164)

Identification
- Formula mass: 2,096.80 g/mol
- Color: Black
- Crystal habit: Pseudohexagonal prisms
- Cleavage: {001} Poor
- Fracture: Conchoidal to irregular
- Tenacity: Brittle
- Mohs scale hardness: 3
- Luster: Metallic
- Streak: Black
- Diaphaneity: Opaque
- Specific gravity: 6.15
- Optical properties: Biaxial
- Refractive index: 2.7
- Birefringence: 2.7
- Pleochroism: RL Pleochroism (in reflected plane polarised light): Very weak in air, fair in oil
- Other characteristics: Non-fluorescent, nonmagnetic, not radioactive

Pearceite is one of the four so-called "ruby silvers", pearceite Cu(Ag,Cu)_{6}Ag_{9}As_{2}S_{11}, pyrargyrite Ag_{3}SbS_{3}, proustite Ag_{3}AsS_{3} and miargyrite AgSbS_{2}. It was discovered in 1896 and named after Dr Richard Pearce (1837–1927), a Cornish–American chemist and metallurgist from Denver, Colorado.

== Nomenclature ==
Pearceite and polybasite are closely related minerals that form the pearceite-polybasite series. Originally pearceite was thought to be an arsenic analogue of polybasite Cu(Ag,Cu)_{6}Ag_{9}Sb_{2}S_{11}, and was called arsenpolybasite, and one polytype of polybasite was called antimonpearceite. Arsenpolybasite was found to represent two different polytypes, arsenpolybasite-221 and arsenpolybasite-222. In modern usage the old name pearceite is replaced by the polytype name pearceite-Tac, arsenpolybasite-221 by pearceite-T2ac, arsenpolybasite-222 by pearceite-M2a2b2c and antimonpearcite by polybasite-Tac. Pearceite-Tac forms a series with polybasite-Tac.

== Crystallography and Structure ==
Two structural varieties, trigonal and monoclinic, are known. The trigonal variety crystallizes in the hexagonal scalenohedral class 3̅m (3̅ 2/m), space group P3̅m1 (P3̅ 2/m 1). The monoclinic variety crystallises in the prismatic 2/m class, space group C2/m.

Unit cell parameters

- Monoclinic variety: There are two formula units per unit cell (Z = 2), the lengths of the sides of the unit cell are a = 12.64 Å, b = 7.29 Å, c = 11.90 Å and the angle between the c and a directions is β = 90.0°.
- Trigonal variety: There is one formula unit per unit cell (Z = 1), two of the sides are of equal length a = 7.3876 Å and the third side, parallel to the threefold axis, is c = 11.8882 Å.

The crystal structure consists of sheets stacked along the c axis. The arsenic atoms form isolated (As,Sb)S_{3} pyramids, copper cations link two sulfur atoms and the silver cations are found in various sites with low coordination numbers, 2,3 and 4, as is usually the case with silver.

== Properties ==
Pearceite is often granular and massive; crystals are short, tabular pseudohexagonal prisms with bevelled edges, showing triangular striations on faces parallel to the plane containing the a and b axes, and rosettes of such crystals, to 3 cm across. The mineral is black, and in polished section it is white with very dark red internal reflections. It has a black to reddish black streak and a metallic luster, generally opaque, but translucent in very thin fragments.

It is biaxial with a very high refractive index of 2.7 and maximum birefringence δ also 2.7. Dispersion of the optic axes is relatively strong.

Reflected light anisotropism is the property of appearing to change color when viewed under crossed polarised light in a reflected light microscope. Pearceite exhibits moderate anisotropism, often dark violet. The color in reflected plane polarised light is white, with very dark red internal reflections and very weak pleochroism in air, fair in oil. Reflectivity in air at 540 nm is about 30%. It is not fluorescent.

Pearceite is a brittle mineral that breaks with a conchoidal to irregular fracture. It is soft, with hardness only 3, the same as calcite. The silver content gives it a high specific gravity of 6.15, the highest of the ruby silvers. Cleavage is either absent or poor. The mineral is neither magnetic nor radioactive.

== Occurrence and associations ==
The type locality is the Mollie Gibson Mine, Aspen, Aspen District (Roaring Fork District), Pitkin County, Colorado, where the mineral occurs in hydrothermal deposits formed at low to medium temperatures, associated with acanthite, tetrahedrite, native silver, proustite, quartz, baryte and calcite. Type material is lodged at Yale University, New Haven, Connecticut, references 3.4270, 3.4292, 3.4293, and at The Natural History Museum, London, England, reference 84843.
