= Red silver ore =

Red silver ore may refer to:

- Proustite, also known as light red silver or ruby silver ore
- Pyrargyrite, also known as dark red silver ore or ruby silver ore
