= Kepnes =

Kepnes is a surname. Notable people with the surname include:

- Caroline Kepnes (born 1976), American writer, screenwriter, author, and entertainment reporter
- Matthew Kepnes (born 1981), American travel expert, author, and blogger

== See also ==
- Kepner
