= Ernst Friedrich Glocker =

German mineralogist, geologist and paleontologist

- Born: 1 May 1793; Stuttgart, Germany
- Died: 18 July 1858 (aged 65); Stuttgart, Germany
- Occupation(s): Mineralogist, geologist, and paleontologist

Ernst Friedrich Glocker (1 May 1793 – 18 July 1858) was a German mineralogist, geologist, and paleontologist.

== Biography ==
From 1810, he studied theology, philosophy, and sciences at the University of Tübingen, and afterwards, continued his education at Halle. In 1823, he obtained his habilitation with the dissertation thesis, "De Gemmis Plinii inprimis de Topazio", and he later served as a professor at the Magdalene gymnasium in Breslau. In 1834, he became a full professor at the University of Breslau, where he was also director of the mineral cabinet.

During his scientific excursions, he collected minerals and fossils in Silesia, Lusatia, Moravia, and the Sudetenland. He is credited with coining the mineral terms: pyrargyrite (1831), ozokerite (1833), sepiolite (1847), halite (1847), sphalerite (1847), arsenopyrite (1847), and liparite (1847). He also conducted research in the field of botany — in 1836, paleobotanist Heinrich Göppert named the plant genus Glockeria in his honor.

== Published works ==
- Versuch über die Wirkungen des Lichtes auf die Gewächse, 1820 – Experiment involving the effects of light on plants.
- Handbuch der Mineralogie, 1829–31 (2 volumes) – Handbook of mineralogy.
- Versuch einer Charakteristik der schlesisch-mineralogischen Literatur von 1800-1832, (1832) – Characteristics of Silesian mineralogical literature from 1800 to 1832.
- Mineralogische Jahreshefte, 1835 – Mineralogical yearbooks.
- Grundriss der Mineralogie mit Einschluss der Geognosie und Petrefactenkunde, 1839 – Outline of mineralogy with the inclusion of geology and petrology.
- Ueber den Jurakalk von Kurowitz in Mähren und über darin vorkommenden Aptychus imbricatus, 1841 – On the Jurassic limestone of Kurowitz in Mähren.
- Geognostische beschreibung der preussischen Oberlausitz, 1857 – Geognostic description of Prussian Upper Lusatia.
