= Brent Underwood =

American marketer and entrepreneur

Brent William Underwood
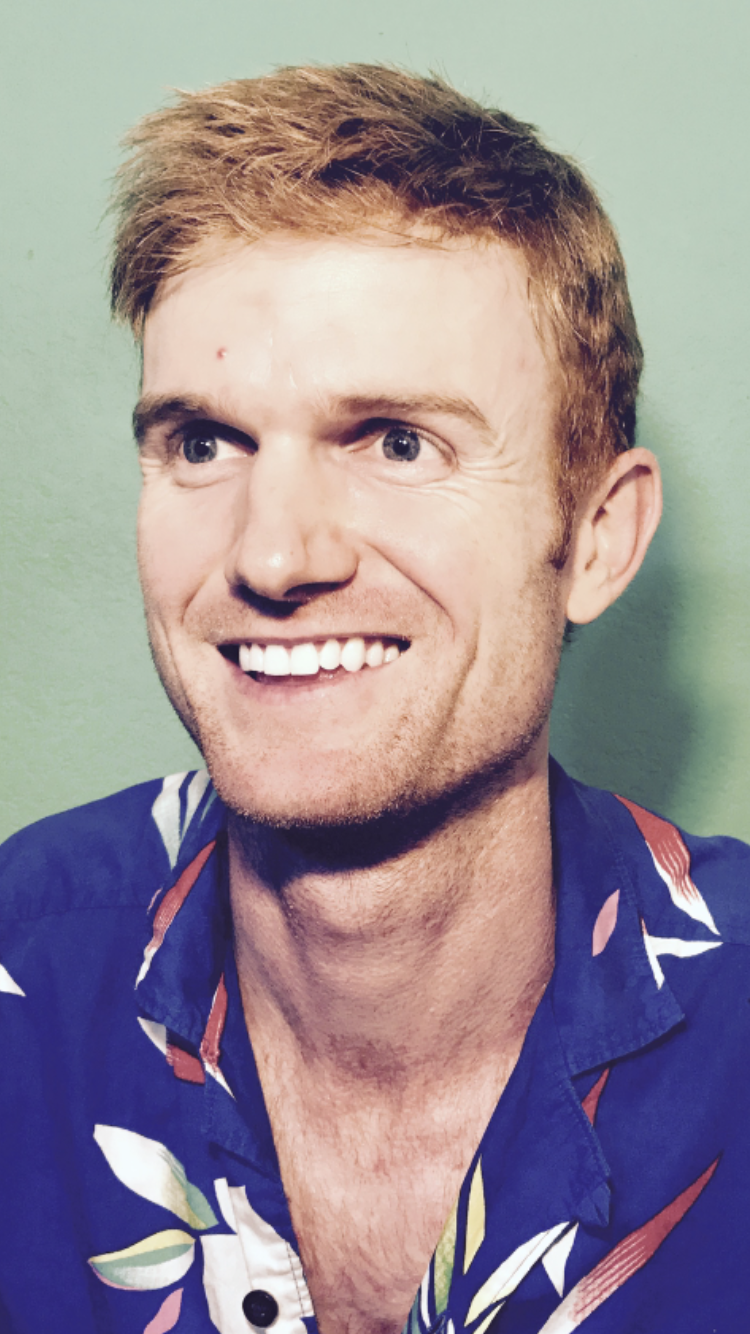
- Born: April 6, 1987 (age 39)
- Occupation: Marketer, Entrepreneur
- Alma mater: Florida State University; Columbia University
- Notable works: "Putting My Foot Down", "Ghost Town Living"

Brent William Underwood is an American entrepreneur and owner of the Cerro Gordo Mines, located in Inyo County, California.

== Career ==
After graduating from Columbia University, Underwood worked briefly for an investment bank in New York City. After one month, he quit and backpacked across Central and South America. Upon returning to New York, he ran a hostel in Brooklyn. In December 2014 Underwood co-founded HK Austin, a hostel in Austin, Texas, with investors including Matthew Kepnes, after staying in 150 hostels across 30 countries. According to Underwood, for 2015, HK Austin was the highest rated hostel in the United States. Underwood later became a partner in the marketing firm Brass Check.

In February 2016, Underwood published a photo of his foot on Amazon as a book titled Putting My Foot Down. The resulting article in the New York Observer received attention from a variety of media outlets and from authors including Neil Gaiman and Nick Bilton. Underwood was then offered a publishing contract from Thought Catalog to turn Putting My Foot Down into an expanded paperback version.

=== Cerro Gordo ===
In July 2018, Underwood purchased the former mining town of Cerro Gordo alongside the Cerro Gordo Mines for $1.4 million. The purchase included over 360 acres and 22 structures. Underwood stated plans to develop the town into an artist destination for tourists and group events, while maintaining the historic nature of the property.

Since March 2020, Underwood has been living at Cerro Gordo full-time and has regular visitors. Visitors have included Jeff Goldblum, Cole Sprouse, and G-Eazy. He was isolated there for ten weeks in 2020, unable to leave due to the COVID-19 pandemic and a heavy snowstorm.

The town's hotel burned down on June 20, 2020, in a fire of undetermined origin but possibly electrical wiring failure, during a heat wave. Underwood completed rebuilding the hotel in late 2025..

As of February 2024, Underwood still resided in Cerro Gordo. His book "Ghost Town Living" was published in March 2024.

=== Ghost Town Living (Book) ===
In 2024, Penguin Random House published Underwood's book, Ghost Town Living: Mining for Purpose and Chasing Dreams at the Edge of Death Valley, about his time living at Cerro Gordo. The audiobook version of the book was recorded 900 feet underground in Cerro Gordo's Union Mine.

The book debuted on the New York Times bestseller list.
