= Kipner =

Kipner is a surname. Notable people with the surname include:

- Nat Kipner (1924–2009), American songwriter and record producer, father of Steve
- Steve Kipner (born 1950), American-born Australian songwriter and record producer

== See also ==
- Kepner
- Kipper (disambiguation)
