= Remi Nadeau =

American historian (1920–2016)

- Born: August 30, 1920; Los Angeles, California, US
- Died: June 6, 2016 (aged 95)

Academic background
- Education: Stanford University; University of California, Santa Barbara

Academic work
- Discipline: History
- Notable works: Los Angeles: From Mission to Modern City

Remi A. Nadeau (August 30, 1920 – June 6, 2016) was an American historian.

== Personal life ==
Born in Los Angeles, Remi Allen Nadeau was the son of the late Marguerite and Remi E. Nadeau and the great-great grandson of "old" Remi Nadeau from the 1870s, known as the "King of the Desert Freighters." Remi Allen was a fifth-generation Californian, a well-known historian and author, and a descendant of one of California's pioneers.

He was husband to his wife Margaret, and father to their three children.

He died on June 6, 2016, in Santa Barbara, California, of natural causes at the age of 95.

== Life and career ==
Remi A. Nadeau's great-great grandfather, Remi Nadeau, was an early French-Canadian emigrant to Los Angeles. In 1861, "old" Remi Nadeau established the first mule-team freight transportation service crossing the Mojave Desert to serve mining areas such as Cerro Gordo and Calico. After the railroads put mule-team freight companies out of business, Nadeau turned to other ventures in the Los Angeles area, including a beet sugar refinery and a hotel.

Nadeau attended University High School in West Los Angeles and was president of the "Boys-League" of his school, while also becoming an Eagle Scout. As a college student, he majored in American and World History at Stanford University and served as the president of Theta Chi, his college fraternity. He received his Bachelor's of Arts degree in 1942.

During World War II, Nadeau became a commissioned officer in the United States Army Air Corps through ROTC. He served with the 320th Bomb Group, flying 23 combat missions in the Martin B-26 Marauder as a reconnaissance photographer, toggle bombardier and tail gunner. Additionally, he served as one of the 320th Group Intelligence Officers, the outfit's newspaper editor and a gunnery-training officer. He saw action in North Africa and the Mediterranean and was also stationed in England and post-war occupied Germany. He completed his military service in 1946 with the rank of major.

Once he returned home after the war, he met Margaret G. Smith of Santa Monica. They began a courtship and married in June 1947 in Santa Monica, California.

In 1946, Nadeau completed his first manuscript, which became City-Makers, published by Doubleday. This best-selling book chronicled the various historical figures that built Los Angeles, including his great, great grandfather. City-Makers launched his career as a California historian. Over his lifetime, he wrote multiple articles and booklets regarding the history of California, the Great West and mid-twentieth century European events.

Nadeau's professional writing career had begun at the Santa Monica Outlook and the San Diego Union newspapers as an editorial writer. Later, he became an executive in the public relations departments of many international corporations, including Atlantic Richfield, North American Aviation, Collins Radio, Rockwell International and Memorex. Additionally he was appointed as the special assistant to the United States Attorney General, where he wrote speeches for Attorneys General John N. Mitchell and Richard Kleindienst. He also wrote several statements on behalf of President Richard Nixon regarding United States Department of Justice policies and issues.

After retirement from corporate life in 1980, Nadeau earned his PhD in History at the University of California, Santa Barbara, 1987. During his retired life, he was a member in such organizations as The Westerners, the Santa Barbara Club, the Cosmopolitan Club, and the Eastern California Historical Society, as well as the First Families of California. He and his wife Margaret regularly attended services at the All-Saints by-the-Sea Episcopal Church of Montecito.

== Works ==
- City-Makers: The Men Who Transformed Los Angeles from Village to Metropolis During the First Great Boom, 1868-1876 ISBN 978-1258823795 (1948)
- Nadeau, Remi A. (1997) [1950]. The Water Seekers (4th ed.). Santa Barbara, CA: Crest Publishers. ISBN 0-9627104-5-8. OCLC 36595807.
- Los Angeles: From Mission to Modern City ASIN B0007E0OI2 (1960)
- Ghost Towns and Mining Camps of California: A History & Guide (1965)
- California: The New Society ASIN B000PW4M7K (1963)
- Fort Laramie and the Sioux Indians ISBN 978-0962710469 (1967)
- The Real Joaquin Murieta: Robin Hood Hero or Gold Rush Gangster: Truth v. Myth ISBN 978-0962710438 (1974)
- Stalin, Churchill and Roosevelt Divide Europe ISBN 978-0275934507 (1990)
- The Silver Seekers: They Tamed California's Last Frontier ISBN 978-0962710476 (2003)
