= Cerro Gordo, California =

Ghost town in California, United States

Coordinates: 36°32′16″N 117°47′42″W

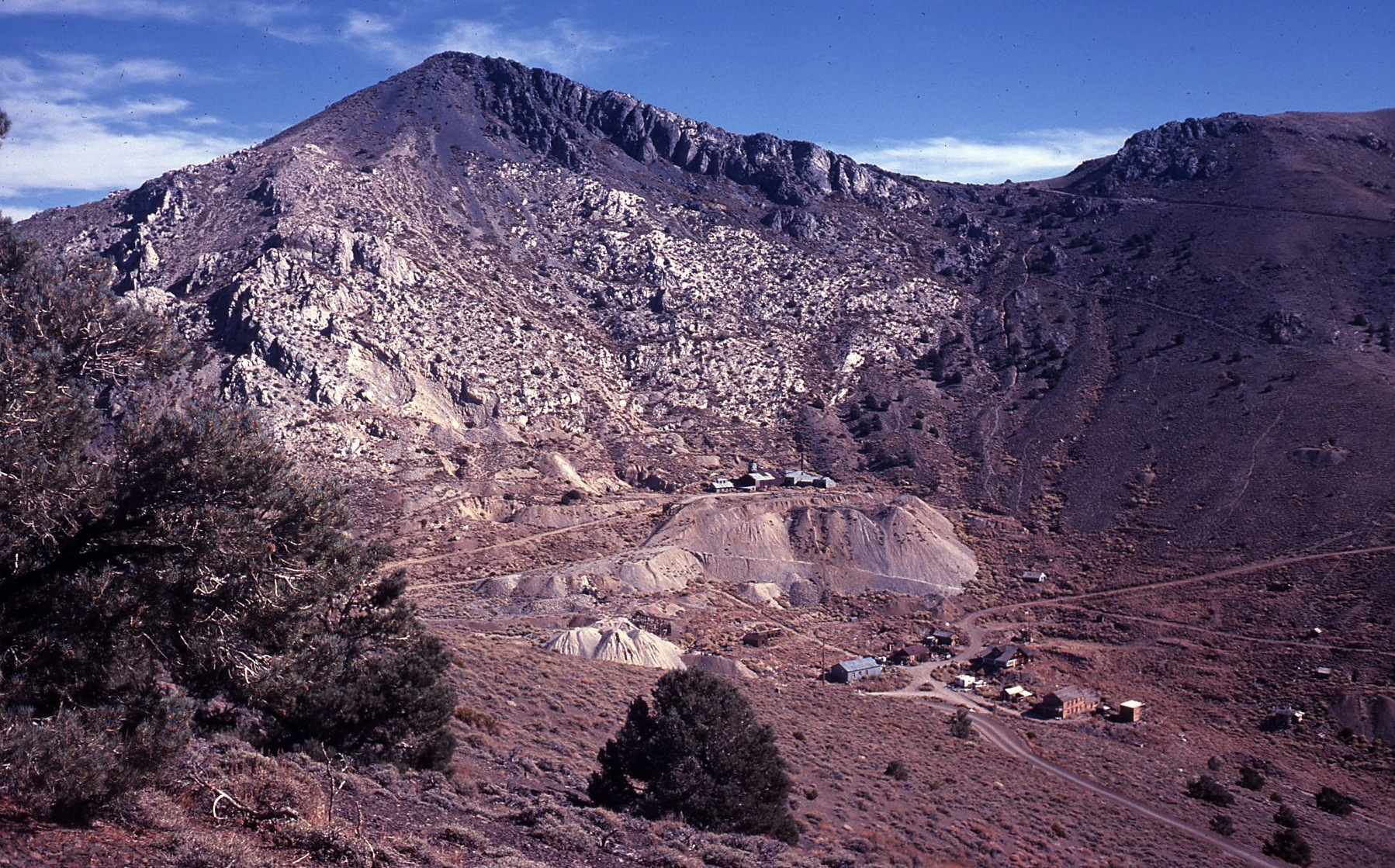
Cerro Gordo in 1980

Cerro Gordo is a former settlement in Inyo County, California, United States, and was primarily a silver mining town based around the Cerro Gordo Mines. At its height, hundreds of dwellings dotted the landscape, while miners sought their fortunes.

== History ==
Cerro Gordo ("Fat Hill" in Spanish) got its name from Mexicans, who regularly searched the area for silver. Mining officially began in 1865 after its discovery by Pablo Flores; by 1867 the word had spread, and scores of prospectors had arrived seeking fortune. In 1866, local businessman Victor Beaudry had opened a store, as well as acquiring several mining claims, including partial interest to the lucrative Union Mine. By 1869, Cerro Gordo was the largest producer of silver and lead in the nation; teams of mules would travel between Cerro Gordo and Los Angeles, California. At its peak, the town was home to several mines, hundreds of structures (most were of the ramshackle variety), bars, a general store, and a hotel. The isolated nature of the town led to much lawlessness, as gunfights were recorded in its time.

The prosperity of Cerro Gordo was short-lived; by 1877 a fire raged throughout the mines, burning down much of the infrastructure. Falling silver and lead prices were the final straw, and most of the inhabitants left as quickly as they came. The town briefly came back to life for a few decades, starting in 1905, as it was used for zinc processing. The town was left mostly abandoned, save for a few caretakers who stayed behind.

The ghost town of Cerro Gordo was purchased for 1.4 million dollars in June 2018 with the intent to turn it into a tourist attraction, accessed by special permission. At that time, it had several vintage buildings, including the general store and 336 acres (136 ha). The buyers, Brent Underwood and Jon Bier, purchased the property with additional Los Angeles-based investors. The American Hotel, an icehouse, and a residence were destroyed in a suspected electrical fire on June 15, 2020. Despite these challenges, in 2021 Underwood said he was still committed to the project. The structure of the new American Hotel was completed in 2025.

== Accessibility ==
Cerro Gordo is accessible by an 8-mile dirt utility road; use of a 4WD vehicle is recommended, but the road can be navigated in a 2WD vehicle.

== See also ==
- Cerro Gordo Mines
