= Cerro Gordo Mines =

Abandoned mines in the Inyo Mountains, California

Cerro Gordo
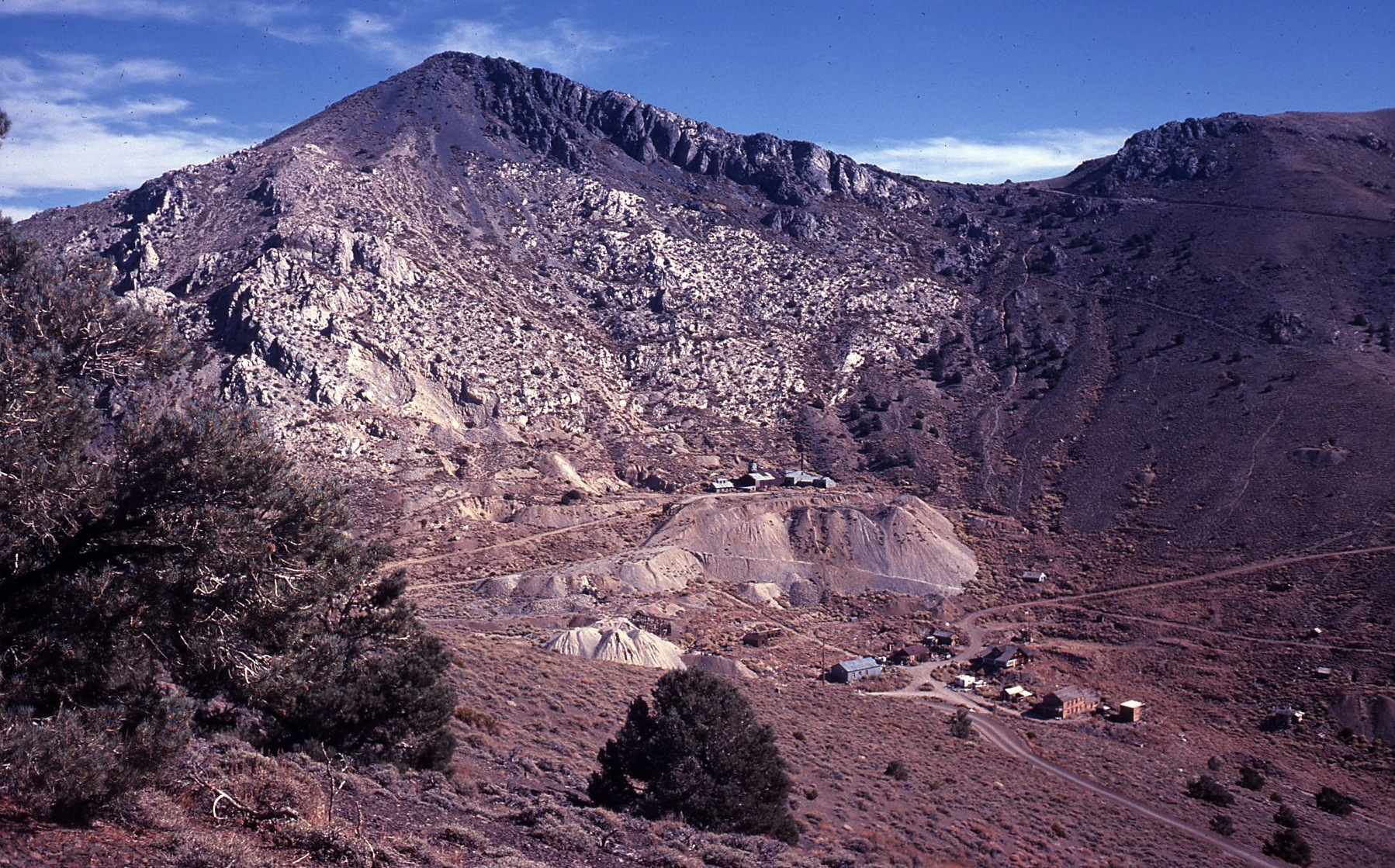
- Cerro Gordo Mines and ghost town in 1980

- Location within California
- Location: near Keeler, California, California, United States; 36°32′16″N 117°47′42″W
- Products: silver, lead, and zinc
- Type: underground
- Greatest depth: at least 1,100 ft (340 m)
- Discovered: 1865
- Opened: 1866
- Closed: 1957
- Company: Brent Underwood

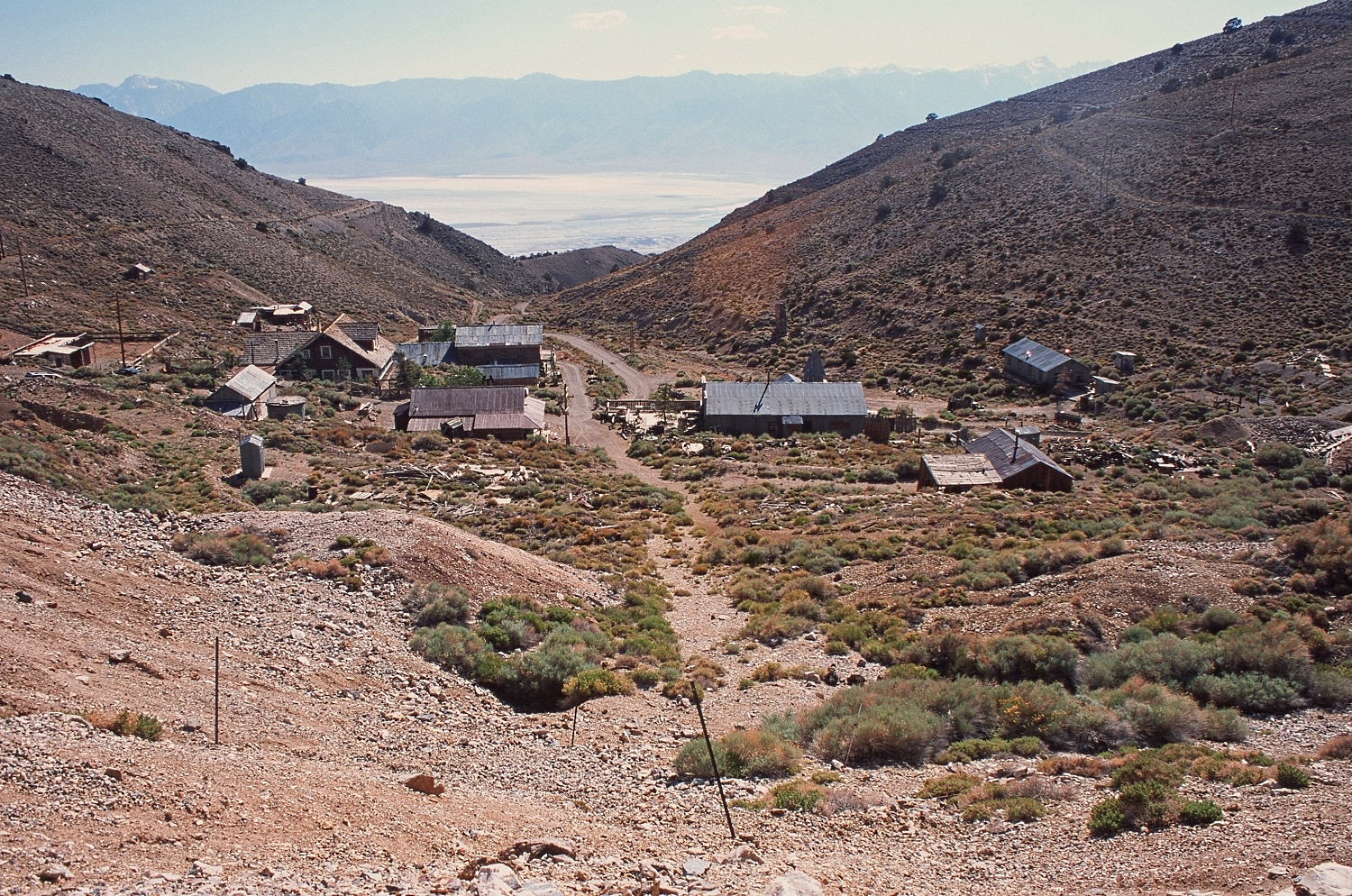
Looking west over Cerro Gordo down to Owens Valley and the Sierra Nevada mountains beyond

The Cerro Gordo Mines are a collection of abandoned mines located in Cerro Gordo in the Inyo Mountains, Inyo County, near Lone Pine, California, United States. Mining operations were conducted from 1866 to 1957, producing high grade silver, lead, and zinc ore; and, more rarely, gold and copper.

Some ore was smelted on site, but larger capacity smelters were eventually constructed along the shore of nearby Owens Lake. These smelting operations were the beginnings of the towns of Swansea and Keeler. Most of the metal ingots produced here were transported to Los Angeles. Mining of silver and lead peaked in the early 1880s, with a second mining boom producing zinc in the 1910s.

Home to some 4,700 people during its peak, the site is now a California ghost town.

== History ==
Discovery of the silver ore is credited to Pablo Flores, who began mining and smelting operations near the summit of Buena Vista Peak in 1865. Increasing migration to the area was met with resistance from the indigenous inhabitants (the Owens Valley Paiute people), which limited early mining efforts. The Owens Valley Paiute people were subdued after the re-occupation of Fort Independence (1865-1877), facilitating the expansion of the mining town.

These early miners employed relatively primitive techniques of open pits and trenches and used adobe ovens to smelt the ore. Businessman Victor Beaudry (younger brother of Los Angeles Mayor and developer Prudent Beaudry) of nearby Independence, California, became impressed by the quality of silver mined at Cerro Gordo and opened a store nearby. He soon acquired several mining claims to settle unpaid debts and proceeded to have two modern smelters built. Beaudry continued acquiring mining rights from debtors until he soon owned a majority of the richest and most productive mines in the area, including partial interest in the Union Mine.

In 1868, Mortimer Belshaw arrived in Cerro Gordo (lit. "Fat Hill" in Spanish), attracted by the rich deposits of galena ore. After establishing a partnership with another stakeholder in the Union Mine, he brought the first wagon load of silver from Cerro Gordo to Los Angeles. In Los Angeles he was able to secure financing to build his own smelter that was superior to all other smelters at Cerro Gordo, as well as to build the first wagon road up the mountain. This road became known as the Yellow Road from the color of the rock that it had been cut through. By operating the Yellow Road as a toll road, Belshaw was able to earn income and control the shipments of silver from the mountain.

Between 1879 and 1880 in Cerro Gordo district, 4,223 short tons (8,446,000 lb; 3,831 t) of ore was raised and treated, $3,307 ($88,088 in 2021) gold bullion produced and $140,517 ($3,742,932 in 2021) worth of silver bullion produced. During its entire operating history from 1865 to 1949, mines produced over 35,000 short tons (70,000,000 lb; 32,000 t) of lead, 4,400,000 troy ounces (300,000 lb; 140,000 kg) of silver and 11,800 short tons (23,600,000 lb; 10,700 t) of zinc, with an estimated worth of over $17 million.

By 1907, high-grade zinc ore was found in Cerro Gordo and ore shipments begun, and by 1912, Cerro Gordo became the largest producer of zinc carbonates in the U.S.

In 1916, the town became electrified, replacing the steam power that operated the machinery.

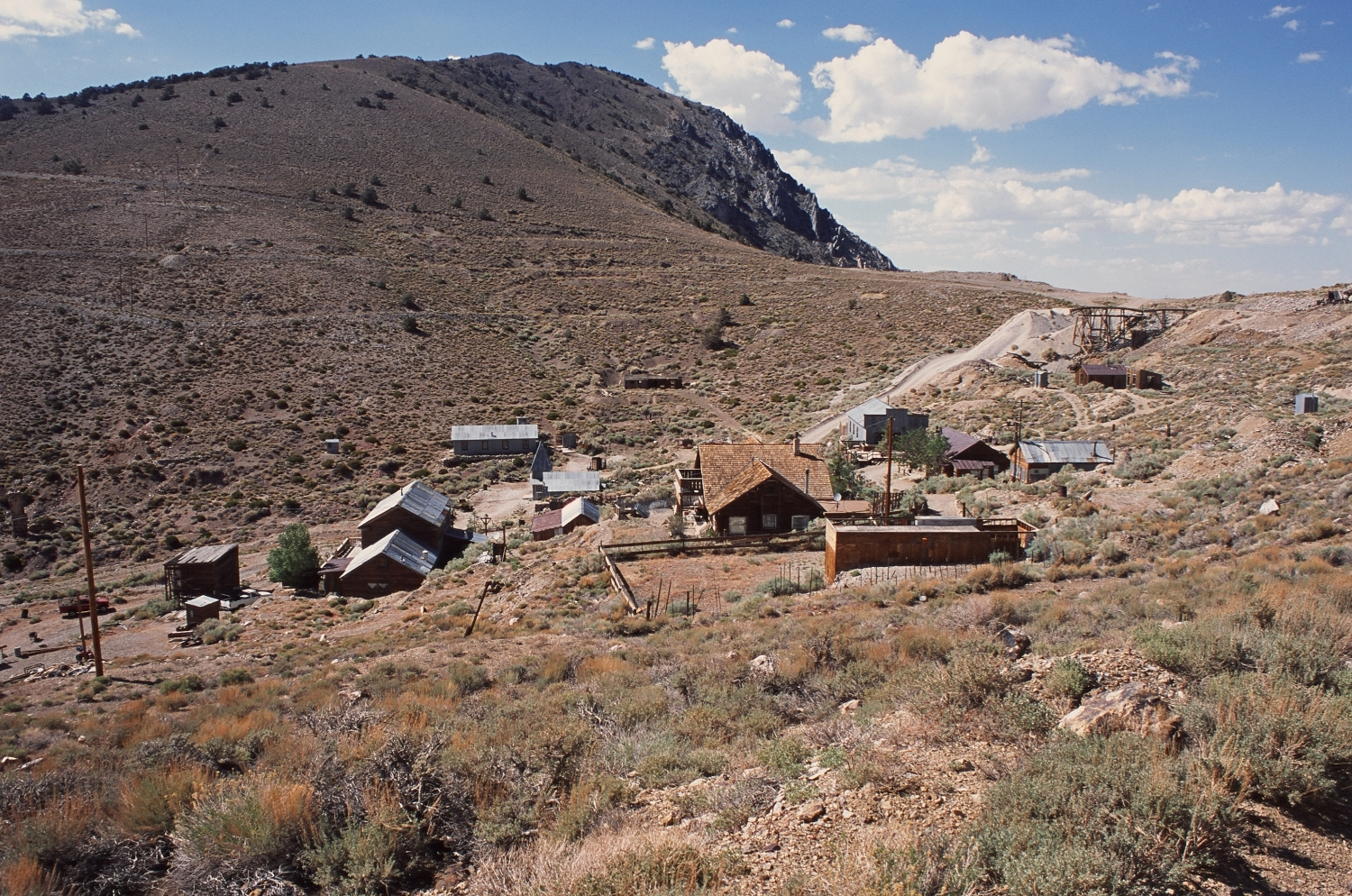
Looking north

In 1920, about ten miners still worked, mostly mining silver-lead ore. Mining had largely ceased by 1938. As of 2019, a former high school teacher was the only miner; the then-70-year-old had been collecting small amounts of silver underground since 1997, selling the silver to tourists, while searching for a productive vein.

The Cerro Gordo mines were the most extensive with more than 30 miles (160,000 ft; 48 km) of underground tunnels in the Cerro Gordo Mining District.

=== 21st century ===
The ghost town of Cerro Gordo was purchased in June 2018 with the intent to turn it into a tourist attraction, accessed by special permission. At that time, it had several vintage buildings, including the general store and 336 acres (136 ha). The buyers, Brent Underwood and Jon Bier, purchased the property with additional Los Angeles-based investors. The American Hotel, an icehouse, and a residence were destroyed in a fire on June 15, 2020. Despite these challenges, Underwood says he is still committed to the project.

In 2021, it was revealed the previous owners had sold the mining claims of the nearby area to K2 Gold Corp. There were plans to start a cyanide opencast mine using cyanide in the adjacent Conglomerate Mesa Formation area. As of March 17, 2022, K2 Gold Corp announced it was suspending a proposal to expand gold mining exploration and road building on California's Conglomerate Mesa Formation after the U.S. Bureau of Land Management required an environmental impact statement for the project.

== Buildings ==
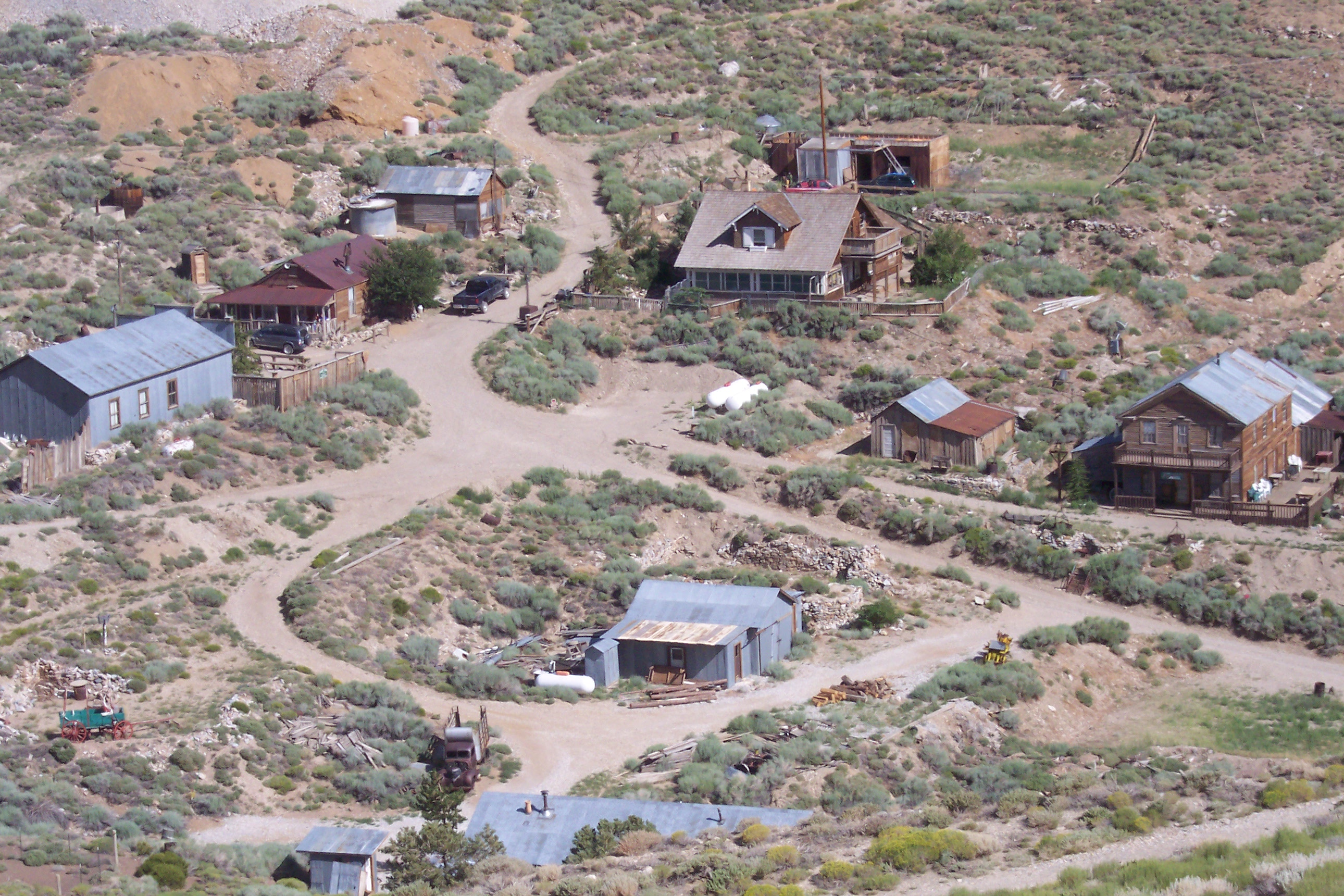
Buildings surrounding the Main street in Cerro Gordo in 2005

The American Hotel was built in 1871 by John Simpson, and was the oldest standing hotel in California on the east side of the Sierra. On the morning of June 15, 2020, a fire destroyed the hotel and neighboring buildings. A reconstruction of the hotel was completed in 2025.

The Belshaw House was built around 1868 by Mortimer Belshaw, developer of the Belshaw Blast Furnace.

The Gordon House was built in 1909 by Louis D. Gordon, who began the "zinc era" of Cerro Gordo.

Buildings in Cerro Gordo

== In popular culture ==
Remi Nadeau, a descendant of the family involved with the transport of ingots from Cerro Gordo across Owens Lake and by mule train to Los Angeles, has written books and articles on the period.

In 2013, an episode in the series Artbound entitled "Agh20: Silver and Water" featured Cerro Gordo's role as a source of silver for the nascent film industry in California.

Cerro Gordo, the Belshaw House, and the Inyo Mine are featured in the season 19 episode of Ghost Adventures titled "Cerro Gordo Ghost Town", which aired in 2019 on the Travel Channel.

In 2020, one of the town's owners, Brent Underwood, started a YouTube channel chronicling his intended development of the town into a functioning tourist destination and his exploration of mine tunnels. In 2024, he released his book "Ghost Town Living," about the challenges and isolation of residing in the ghost town for four years.

In 2025, Cerro Gordo and its mines were featured in an episode of the Dropout.TV series "Game Changer", season 7 episode 1, "One Year Later". Contestants on the show were given a prompt to complete by show host Sam Reich, asking "Who can bring the Sam standee to the most remote location?" Comedian and gameshow contestant Jacob Wysocki delivered his version of the cardboard cutout of Sam to Cerro Gordo, meeting with Brent Underwood in a travelogue-style bit. Underwood assisted Wysocki in sending the Sam cutout down into the mines in an attempt to place it in "the most remote location" as required.
