= Ruby blende =

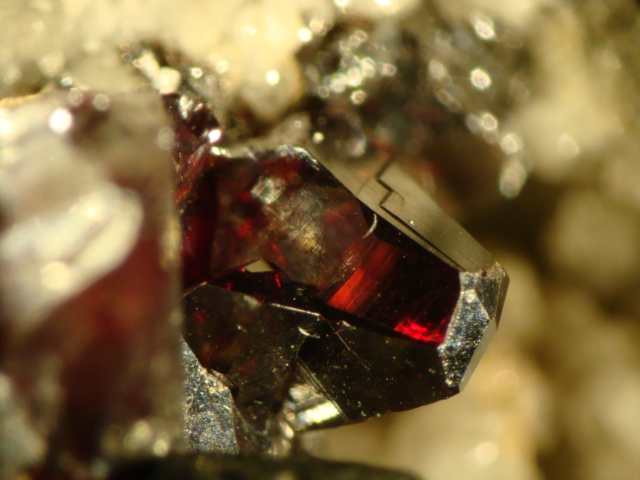
- Ruby blende (Atacama, Chile)

General
- Category: Minerals

Ruby blende or garnete blende are two close trivial names for several dissimilar minerals, with their appearance sometimes imitating red-colored precious stones, primarily natural garnets or rubies. In the scientific community, the systematic use of the term generally ended in the 19th century, with the transition to the modern system of naming minerals. Currently, both names are primarily used among mineral collectors and dealers, as well as geologists, miners and related trades.

- Miargyrite is a rare steel-colored ore mineral with an internal garnet reflection, very fragile.
- Pyrargyrite is a relatively rare ore mineral of dark red color with a diamond-metallic sheen, related to the previous one.
- Proustite is a silver ore mineral, similar in composition to the previous two, and forms crimson crystals with a lead-gray sheen.
- Sphalerite is zinc blende, some varieties of which have a rich red color with an orange tint.

== Gallery ==
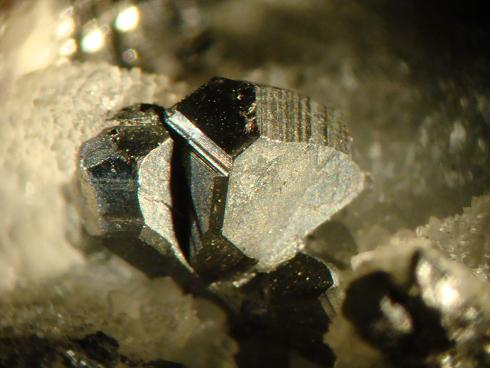
Miargyrite

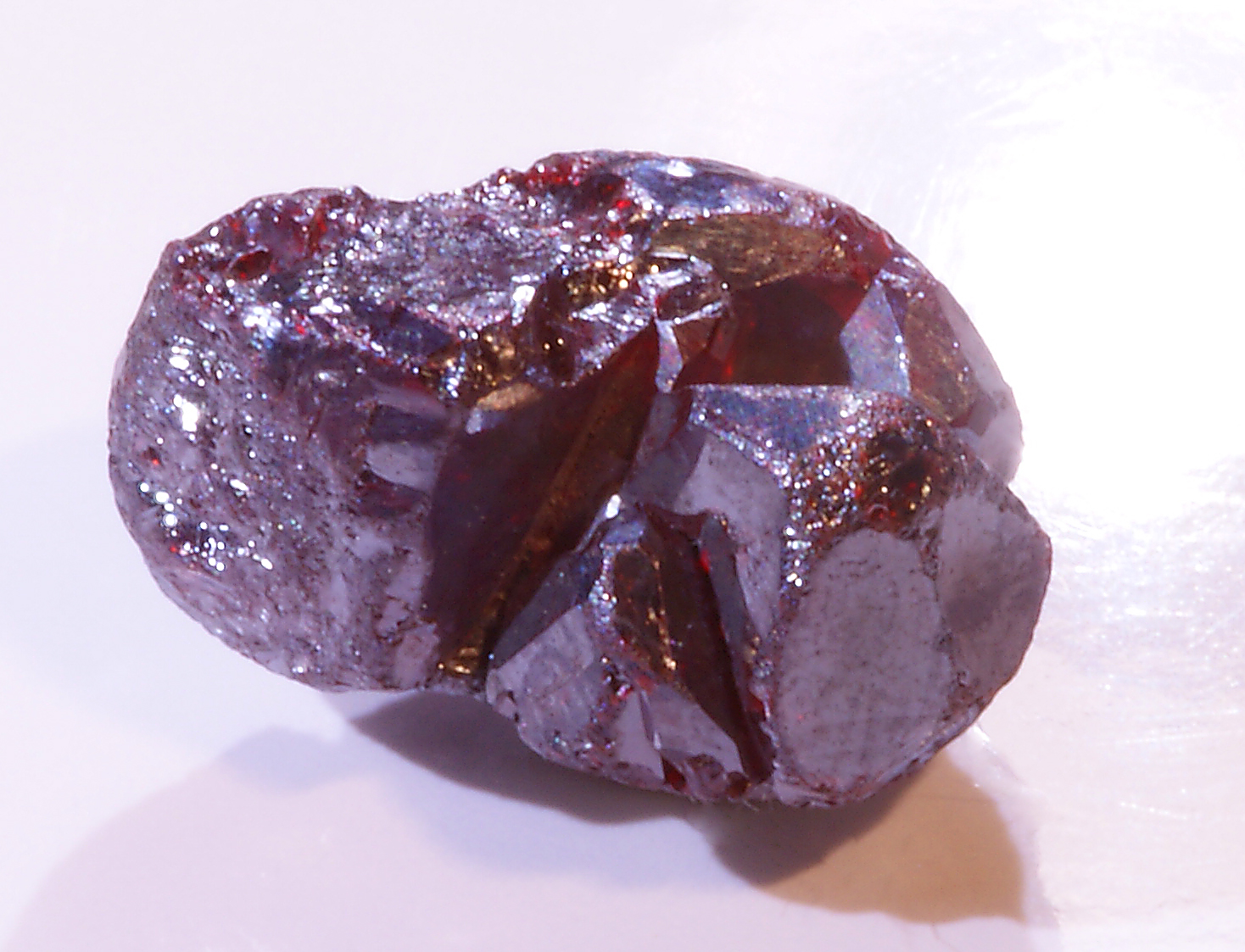
Pyrargyrite

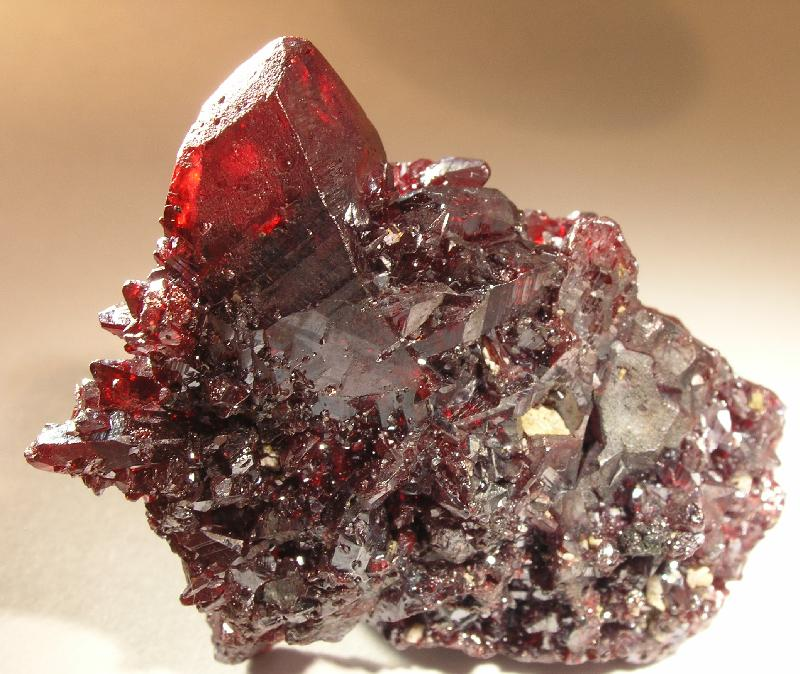
Proustite

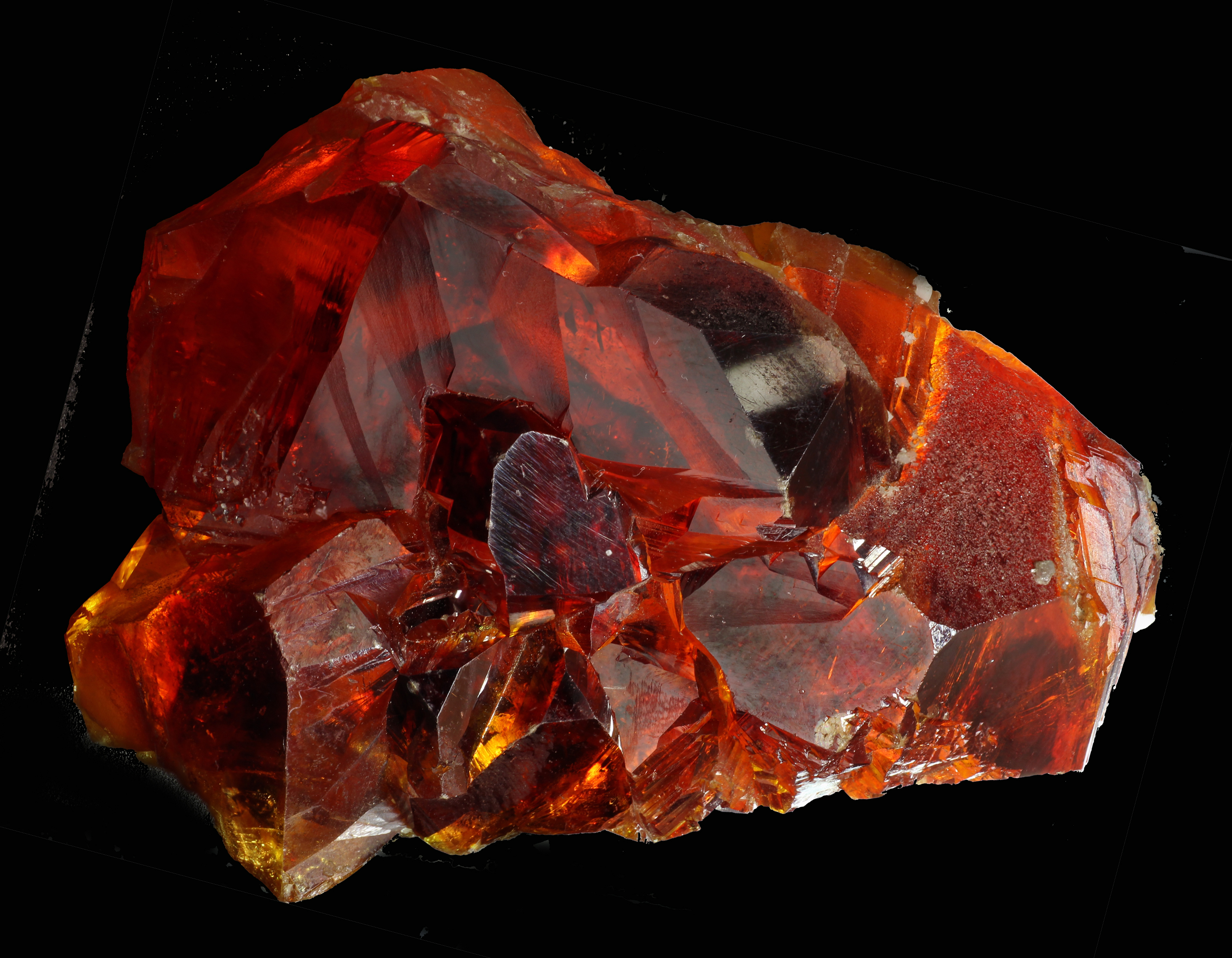
Sphalerite

== See also ==
- Garnet (disambiguation)
- Ruby (disambiguation)
- Blende (disambiguation)
