= Kurovice =

- Municipality
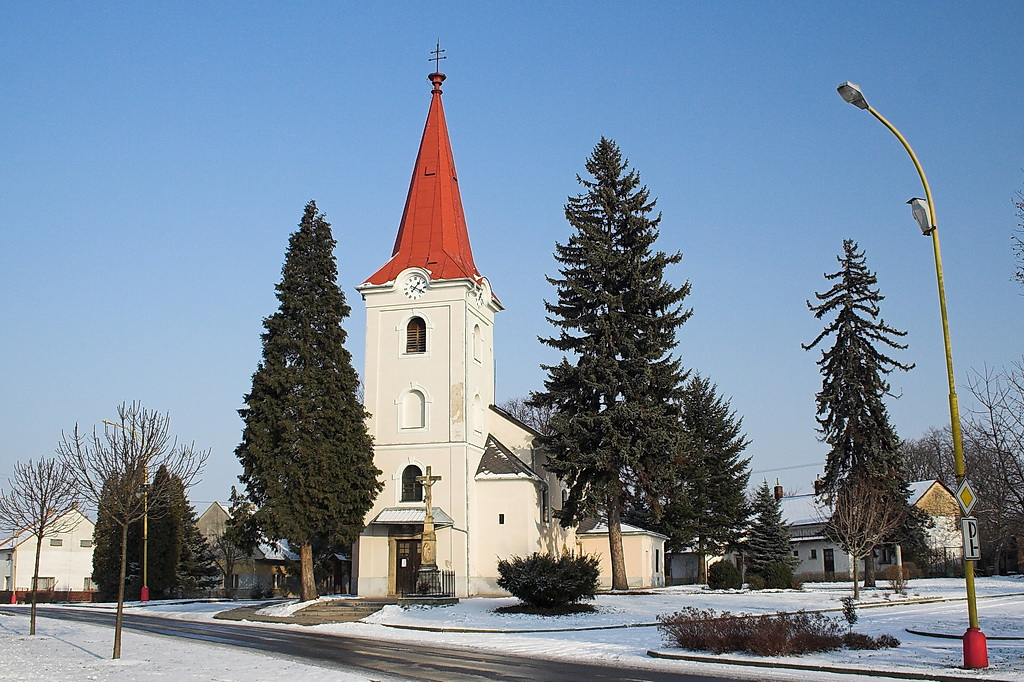
- Church of Saint Cunigunde

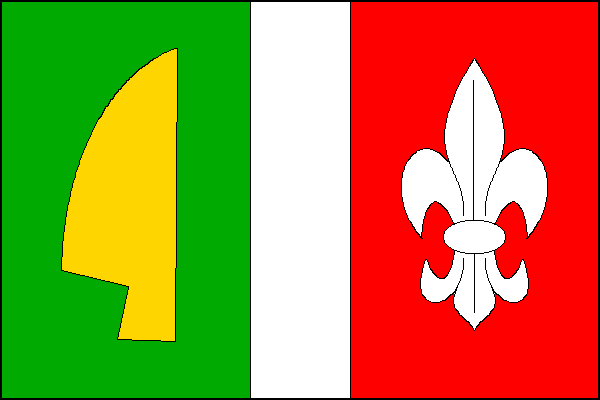
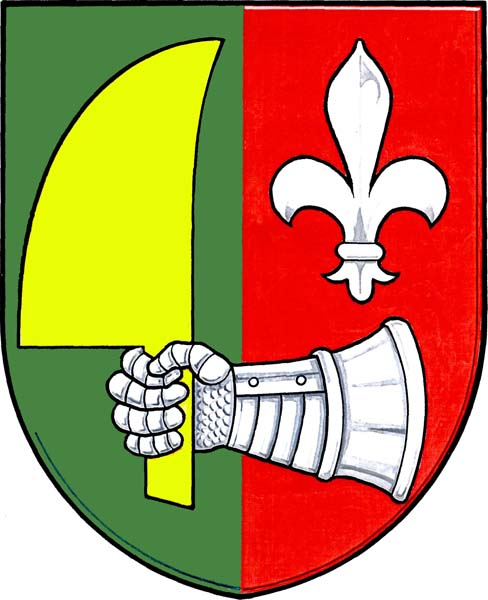
- Flag Coat of arms

- Location in the Czech Republic
- Coordinates: 49°17′21″N 17°30′56″E
- Country: Czech Republic
- Region: Zlín
- District: Kroměříž
- First mentioned: 1276

Area
  - Total: 5.50 km^{2} (2.12 sq mi)
- Elevation: 211 m (692 ft)

Population (2026-01-01)
  - Total: 258
  - Density: 46.9/km^{2} (121/sq mi)
- Time zone: UTC+1 (CET)
  - Summer (DST): UTC+2 (CEST)
- Postal code: 768 52
- Website: www.kurovice.cz

Kurovice is a municipality and village in Kroměříž District in the Zlín Region of the Czech Republic. It has about 300 inhabitants.

Kurovice lies approximately 9 kilometres (6 mi) east of Kroměříž, 13 km (8 mi) north-west of Zlín, and 240 km (150 mi) east of Prague.

== Demographics ==
Historical population
Year	Pop.	±%
1869	255	—
1880	483	+89.4%
1890	498	+3.1%
1900	492	−1.2%
1910	517	+5.1%
1921	529	+2.3%
1930	493	−6.8%
1950	417	−15.4%
1961	390	−6.5%
1970	341	−12.6%
1980	290	−15.0%
1991	265	−8.6%
2001	251	−5.3%
2011	248	−1.2%
2021	254	+2.4%
Source: Censuses
