= Sphalerite =

Zinc-iron sulfide mineral

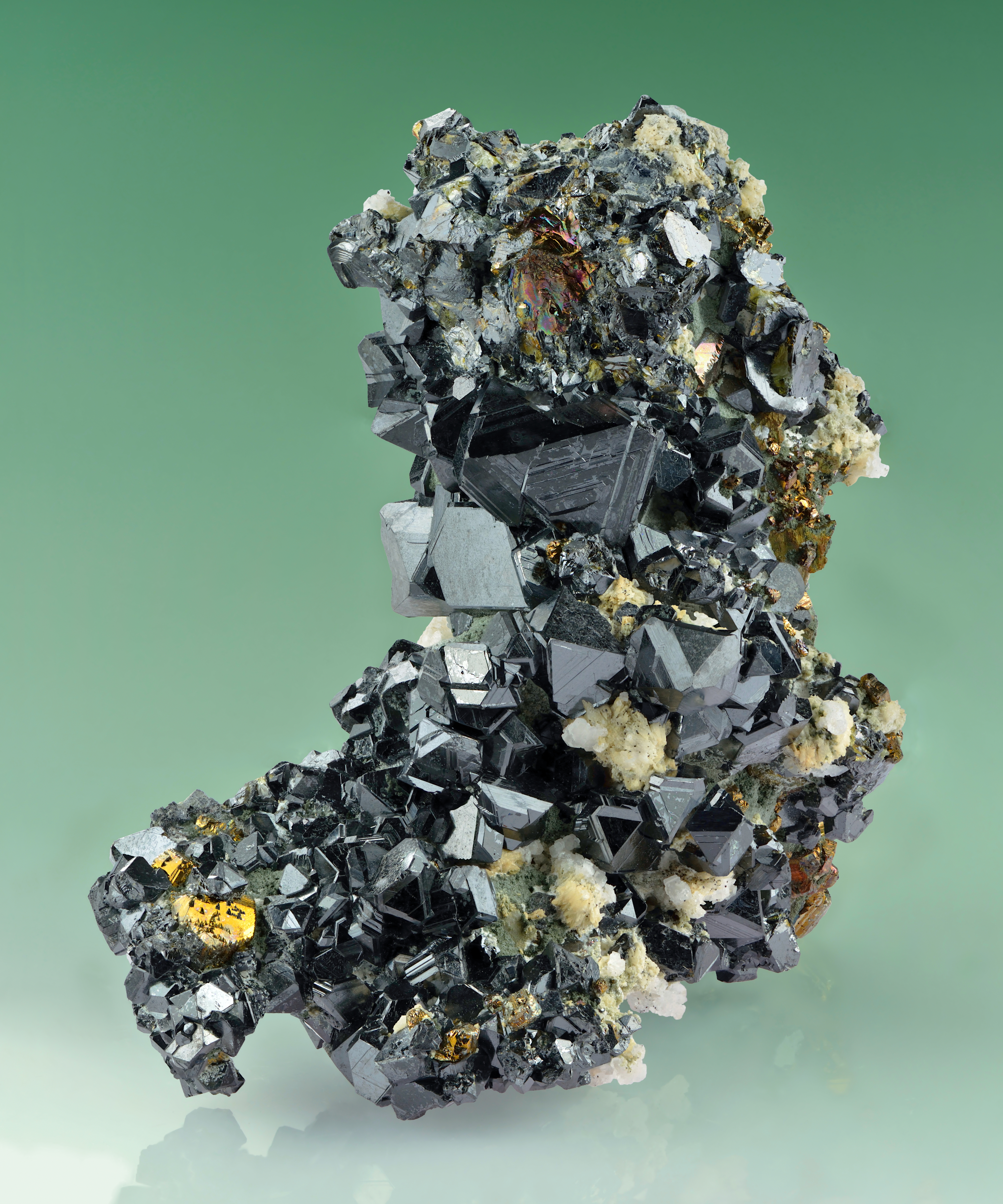
- Black crystals of sphalerite with minor chalcopyrite and calcite

General
- Category: Sulfide mineral
- Formula: (Zn,Fe)S
- IMA symbol: Sp
- Strunz classification: 2.CB.05a
- Dana classification: 02.08.02.01
- Crystal system: Cubic
- Crystal class: Hextetrahedral (4̅3m); H-M symbol: (4̅ 3m)
- Space group: F4̅3m (No. 216)
- Unit cell: a = 5.406 Å; Z = 4

Structure
- Jmol (3D): Interactive image

Identification
- Color: Light to dark brown, red-brown, yellow, red, green, light blue, black and colourless.
- Crystal habit: Euhedral crystals – occurs as well-formed crystals showing good external form. Granular – generally occurs as anhedral to subhedral crystals in matrix.
- Twinning: Simple contact twins or complex lamellar forms, twin axis [111]
- Cleavage: perfect dodecahedral on [011]
- Fracture: Uneven to conchoidal
- Mohs scale hardness: 3.5–4
- Luster: Adamantine, resinous, greasy
- Streak: brownish white, pale yellow
- Diaphaneity: Transparent to translucent, opaque when iron-rich
- Specific gravity: 3.9–4.2
- Optical properties: Isotropic
- Refractive index: n_{α} = 2.369
- Other characteristics: non-radioactive, non-magnetic, fluorescent and triboluminescent.

Sphalerite is a sulfide mineral with the chemical formula (Zn, Fe)S. It is the most important ore of zinc. Sphalerite is found in a variety of deposit types, but it is primarily in sedimentary exhalative, Mississippi-Valley type, and volcanogenic massive sulfide deposits. It is found in association with galena, chalcopyrite, pyrite (and other sulfides), calcite, dolomite, quartz, rhodochrosite, and fluorite.

German geologist Ernst Friedrich Glocker discovered sphalerite in 1847, naming it based on the Greek word sphălerós (σφαλερός), meaning 'deceiving', due to the difficulty of identifying the mineral.

In addition to zinc, sphalerite is an ore of cadmium, gallium, germanium, and indium. Miners have been known to refer to sphalerite as zinc blende, black-jack, and ruby blende. Marmatite is an opaque black variety with a high iron content.

== Crystal habit and structure ==
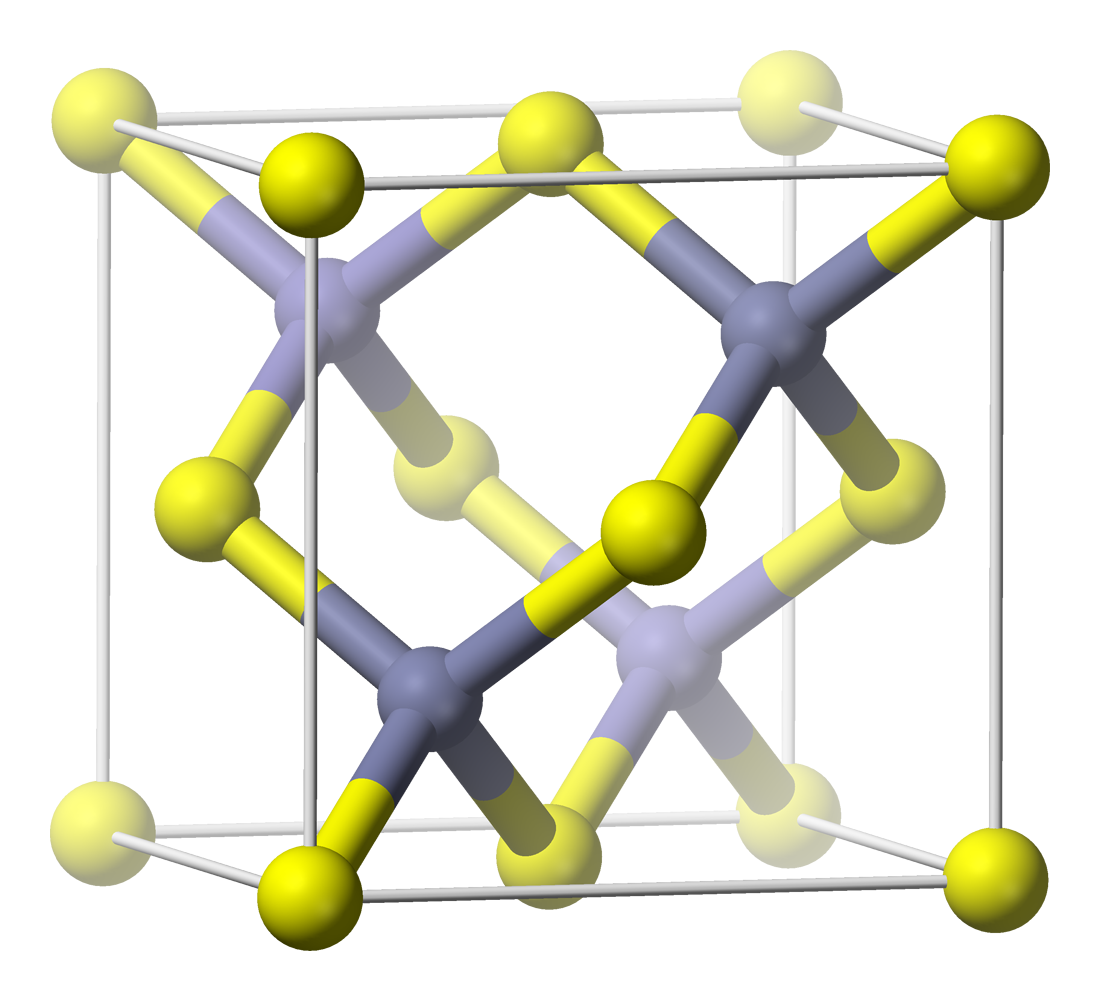
The crystal structure of sphalerite

Sphalerite crystallizes in the face-centered cubic zincblende crystal structure, which was named after the mineral. This structure is a member of the hextetrahedral crystal class (space group F4̅3m). In the crystal structure, both the sulfur and the zinc or iron ions occupy the points of a face-centered cubic lattice, with the two lattices displaced from each other such that the zinc and iron are tetrahedrally coordinated to the sulfur ions, and vice versa. Minerals similar to sphalerite include those in the sphalerite group, consisting of sphalerite, colaradoite, hawleyite, metacinnabar, stilleite and tiemannite. The structure is closely related to the structure of diamond. The hexagonal polymorph of sphalerite is wurtzite, and the trigonal polymorph is matraite. Wurtzite is the higher temperature polymorph, stable at temperatures above 1,020 °C (1,870 °F). The lattice constant for zinc sulfide in the zinc blende crystal structure is 0.541 nm. Sphalerite has been found as a pseudomorph, taking the crystal structure of galena, tetrahedrite, barite and calcite. Sphalerite can have Spinel Law twins, where the twin axis is [111].

The chemical formula of sphalerite is (Zn,Fe)S; the iron content generally increases with increasing formation temperature and can reach up to 40%. The material can be considered a ternary compound between the binary endpoints ZnS and FeS with composition Zn_{x}Fe_{(1-x)}S, where x can range from 1 (pure ZnS) to 0.6.

All natural sphalerite contains concentrations of various impurities, which generally substitute for zinc in the cation position in the lattice; the most common cation impurities are cadmium, mercury and manganese, but gallium, germanium and indium may also be present in relatively high concentrations (hundreds to thousands of ppm). Cadmium can replace up to 1% of zinc and manganese is generally found in sphalerite with high iron abundances. Sulfur in the anion position can be substituted for by selenium and tellurium. The abundances of these impurities are controlled by the conditions under which the sphalerite formed; formation temperature, pressure, element availability and fluid composition are important controls.

== Properties ==
=== Physical properties ===
Sphalerite possesses perfect dodecahedral cleavage, having six cleavage planes. In pure form, it is a semiconductor, but transitions to a conductor as the iron content increases. It has a hardness of 3.5 to 4 on the Mohs scale of mineral hardness.

It can be distinguished from similar minerals by its perfect cleavage, its distinctive resinous luster, and the reddish-brown streak of the darker varieties.

=== Optical properties ===
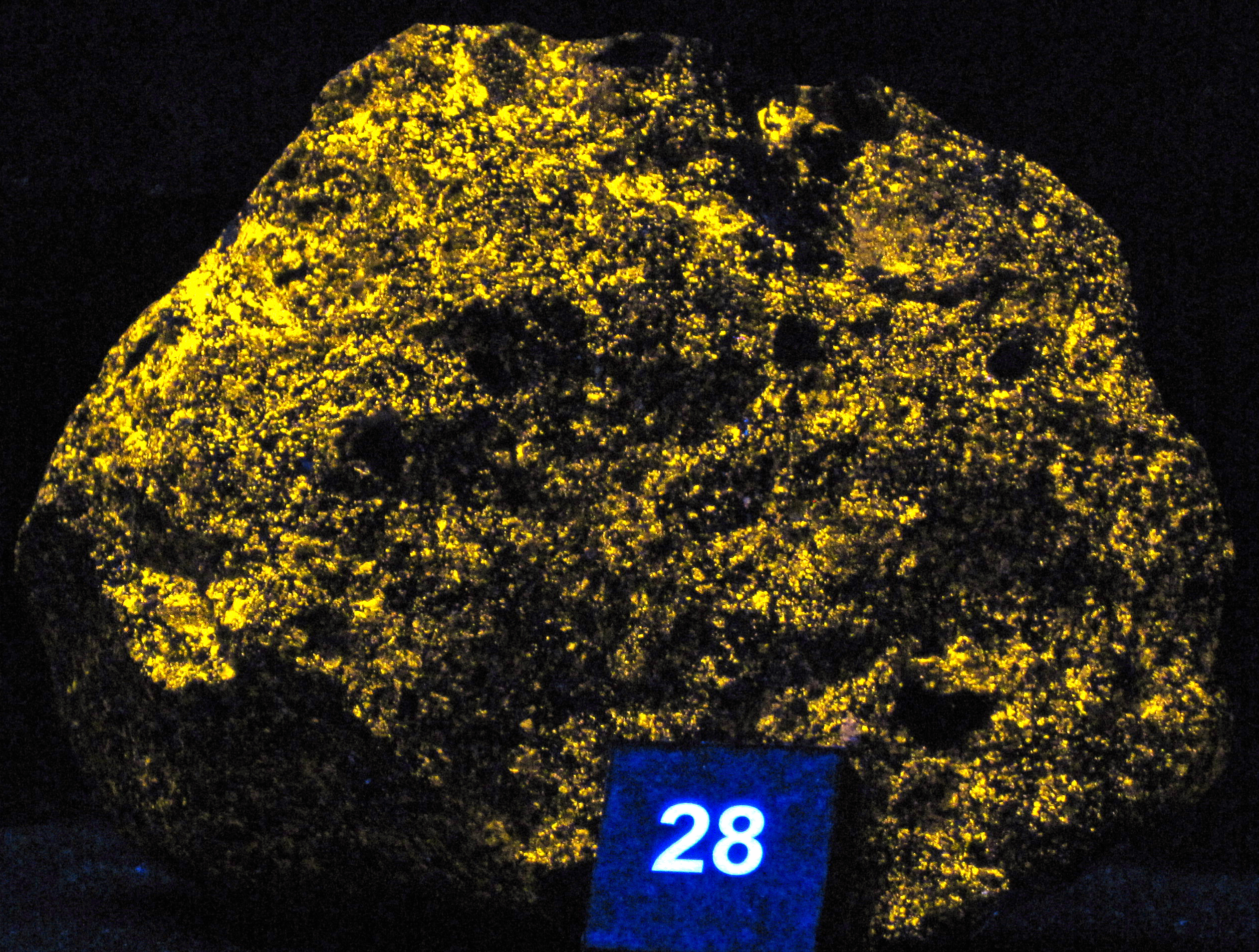
Sphalerite fluorescing under ultraviolet light (Sternberg Museum of Natural History, Kansas, US)

Pure zinc sulfide is a wide-bandgap semiconductor, with bandgap of about 3.54 electron volts, which makes the pure material transparent in the visible spectrum. Increasing iron content will make the material opaque, while various impurities can give the crystal a variety of colors. In thin section, sphalerite exhibits very high positive relief and appears colorless to pale yellow or brown, with no pleochroism.

The refractive index of sphalerite (as measured via sodium light, average wavelength 589.3 nm) ranges from 2.37 when it is pure ZnS to 2.50 when there is 40% iron content. Sphalerite is isotropic under cross-polarized light, however sphalerite can experience birefringence if intergrown with its polymorph wurtzite; the birefringence can increase from 0 (0% wurtzite) up to 0.022 (100% wurtzite).

Depending on the impurities, sphalerite will fluoresce under ultraviolet light. Sphalerite can be triboluminescent. Sphalerite has a characteristic triboluminescence of yellow-orange. Typically, specimens cut into end-slabs are ideal for displaying this property. An identification method based on a mineral's optical properties and powered by artificial intelligence algorithms showed good results.

== Varieties ==
Gemmy, colorless to pale green sphalerite from Franklin, New Jersey (see Franklin Furnace), are highly fluorescent orange and/or blue under longwave ultraviolet light and are known as cleiophane, an almost pure ZnS variety. Cleiophane contains less than 0.1% of iron in the sphalerite crystal structure. Marmatite or christophite is an opaque black variety of sphalerite and its coloring is due to high quantities of iron, which can reach up to 25%; marmatite is named after Marmato mining district in Colombia and christophite is named for the St. Christoph mine in Breitenbrunn, Saxony. Both marmatite and cleiophane are not recognized by the International Mineralogical Association (IMA). Red, orange or brownish-red sphalerite is termed ruby blende or ruby zinc, whereas dark colored sphalerite is termed black-jack.

== Deposit types ==
Sphalerite is amongst the most common sulfide minerals, and it is found worldwide and in a variety of deposit types. The reason for the wide distribution of sphalerite is that it appears in many types of deposits; it is found in skarns, hydrothermal deposits, sedimentary beds, volcanogenic massive sulfide deposits (VMS), Mississippi-valley type deposits (MVT), granite and coal.

=== Sedimentary exhalitive ===
Approximately 50% of zinc (from sphalerite) and lead comes from Sedimentary exhalative (SEDEX) deposits, which are stratiform Pb-Zn sulfides that form at seafloor vents. The metals precipitate from hydrothermal fluids and are hosted by shales, carbonates and organic-rich siltstones in back-arc basins and failed continental rifts. The main ore minerals in SEDEX deposits are sphalerite, galena, pyrite, pyrrhotite and marcasite, with minor sulfosalts such as tetrahedrite-freibergite and boulangerite; the zinc + lead grade typically ranges between 10 and 20%. Important SEDEX mines are Red Dog in Alaska, Sullivan Mine in British Columbia, Mount Isa and Broken Hill in Australia and Mehdiabad in Iran.

=== Mississippi-Valley type ===
Similar to SEDEX, Mississippi-Valley type (MVT) deposits are also a Pb-Zn deposit which contains sphalerite. However, they only account for 15–20% of zinc and lead, are 25% smaller in tonnage than SEDEX deposits and have lower grades of 5–10% Pb + Zn. MVT deposits form from the replacement of carbonate host rocks such as dolostone and limestone by ore minerals; they are located in platforms and foreland thrust belts. Furthermore, they are stratabound, typically Phanerozoic in age and epigenetic (form after the lithification of the carbonate host rocks). The ore minerals are the same as SEDEX deposits: sphalerite, galena, pyrite, pyrrhotite and marcasite, with minor sulfosalts. Mines that contain MVT deposits include Polaris in the Canadian arctic, Mississippi River in the United States, Pine Point in Northwest Territories, and Admiral Bay in Australia.

=== Volcanogenic massive sulfide ===
Volcanogenic massive sulfide (VMS) deposits can be Cu-Zn- or Zn-Pb-Cu-rich, and accounts for 25% of Zn in reserves. There are various types of VMS deposits with a range of regional contexts and host rock compositions; a common characteristic is that they are all hosted by submarine volcanic rocks. They form from metals such as copper and zinc being transferred by hydrothermal fluids (modified seawater) which leach them from volcanic rocks in the oceanic crust; the metal-saturated fluid rises through fractures and faults to the surface, where it cools and deposits the metals as a VMS deposit. The most abundant ore minerals are pyrite, chalcopyrite, sphalerite and pyrrhotite. Mines that contain VMS deposits include Kidd Creek in Ontario, Urals in Russia, Troodos in Cyprus, and Besshi in Japan.

=== Localities ===
The top producers of sphalerite include the United States, Russia, Mexico, Germany, Australia, Canada, China, Ireland, Peru, Kazakhstan and England.

Sources of high quality crystals include:

Place	Country
Freiberg, Saxony, Neudorf, Harz Mountains	Germany
Lengenbach Quarry, Binntal, Valais	Switzerland
Horní Slavkov and Příbram	Czech Republic
Rodna	Romania
Madan, Smolyan Province, Rhodope Mountains	Bulgaria
Aliva mine, Picos de Europa Mountains, Cantabria [Santander] Province	Spain
Alston Moor, Cumbria	England
Dalnegorsk, Primorskiy Kray	Russia
Watson Lake, Yukon Territory	Canada
Flin Flon, Manitoba	Canada
Tri-State district including deposits near Baxter Springs, Cherokee County, Kansas; Joplin, Jasper County, Missouri and Picher, Ottawa County, Oklahoma	US
Elmwood mine, near Carthage, Smith County, Tennessee	US
Eagle mine, Gilman district, Eagle County, Colorado	US
Santa Eulalia, Chihuahua	Mexico
Naica, Chihuahua	Mexico
Cananea, Sonora	Mexico
Huaron	Peru
Casapalca	Peru
Huancavelica	Peru
Zinkgruvan	Sweden

== Uses ==
=== Metal ore ===
Sphalerite is an important ore of zinc; around 95% of all primary zinc is extracted from sphalerite ore. However, due to its variable trace element content, sphalerite is also an important source of several other metals such as cadmium, gallium, germanium, and indium which replace zinc. The ore was originally called blende by miners (from German blind or deceiving) because it resembles galena but yields no lead.

=== Brass and bronze ===
The zinc in sphalerite is used to produce brass, an alloy of copper with 3–45% zinc. Major element alloy compositions of brass objects provide evidence that sphalerite was being used to produce brass by the Islamic as far back as the medieval ages between the 7th and 16th century CE. Sphalerite may have also been used during the cementation process of brass in Northern China during the 12th–13th century CE (Jin Dynasty). Besides brass, the zinc in sphalerite can also be used to produce certain types of bronze; bronze is dominantly copper which is alloyed with other metals such as tin, zinc, lead, nickel, iron and arsenic.

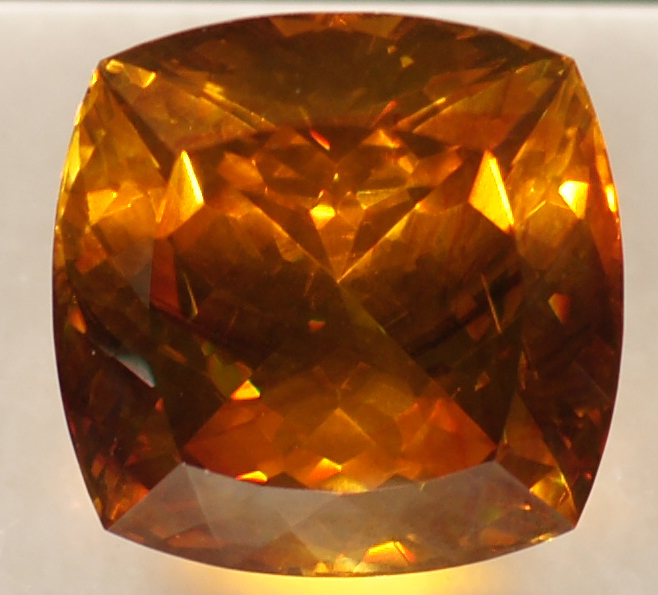
Faceted sphalerite, known by the name of Étoile des Asturies, one of the largest in existence. It actually comes from the Aliva mine, Cantabria (Spain). Cantonal Museum of Geology of Lausanne.

=== Other ===
- Yule Marble – sphalerite is found as inclusions in yule marble, which is used as a building material for the Lincoln Memorial and Tomb of the Unknown.
- Galvanized iron – zinc from sphalerite is used as a protective coating to prevent corrosion and rusting; it is used on power transmission towers, nails and automobiles.
- Batteries.
- Gemstone. - Sphalerite has a high refractive index, close to that of diamond, and an even greater dispersion. The yellowish-green or intense orange color of the variety known as ruby blende allows for the cutting of very beautiful collector’s gems. The problems preventing its use in jewelry are its low hardness (3.5–4 on the Mohs scale) and its fragility, due to its perfect cleavage. This cleavage, with six distinct planes, also makes it difficult to facet. Gem-quality sphalerite has been extracted mainly from the Áliva mine, in the Picos de Europa (Spain), although it has also occasionally been found in other localities.

== Gallery ==
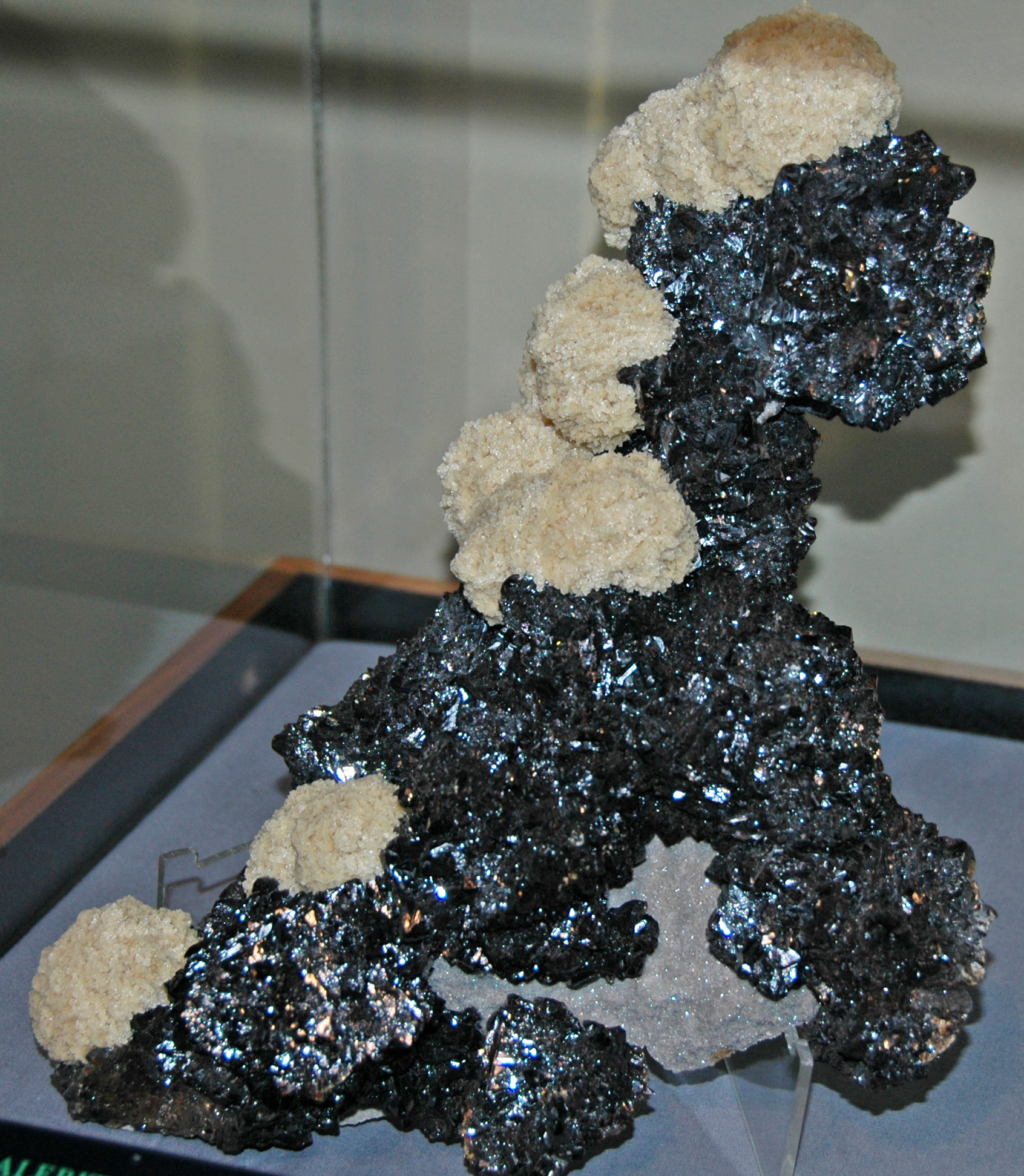
Sphalerite and barite from Cumberland Mine, Tennessee, US

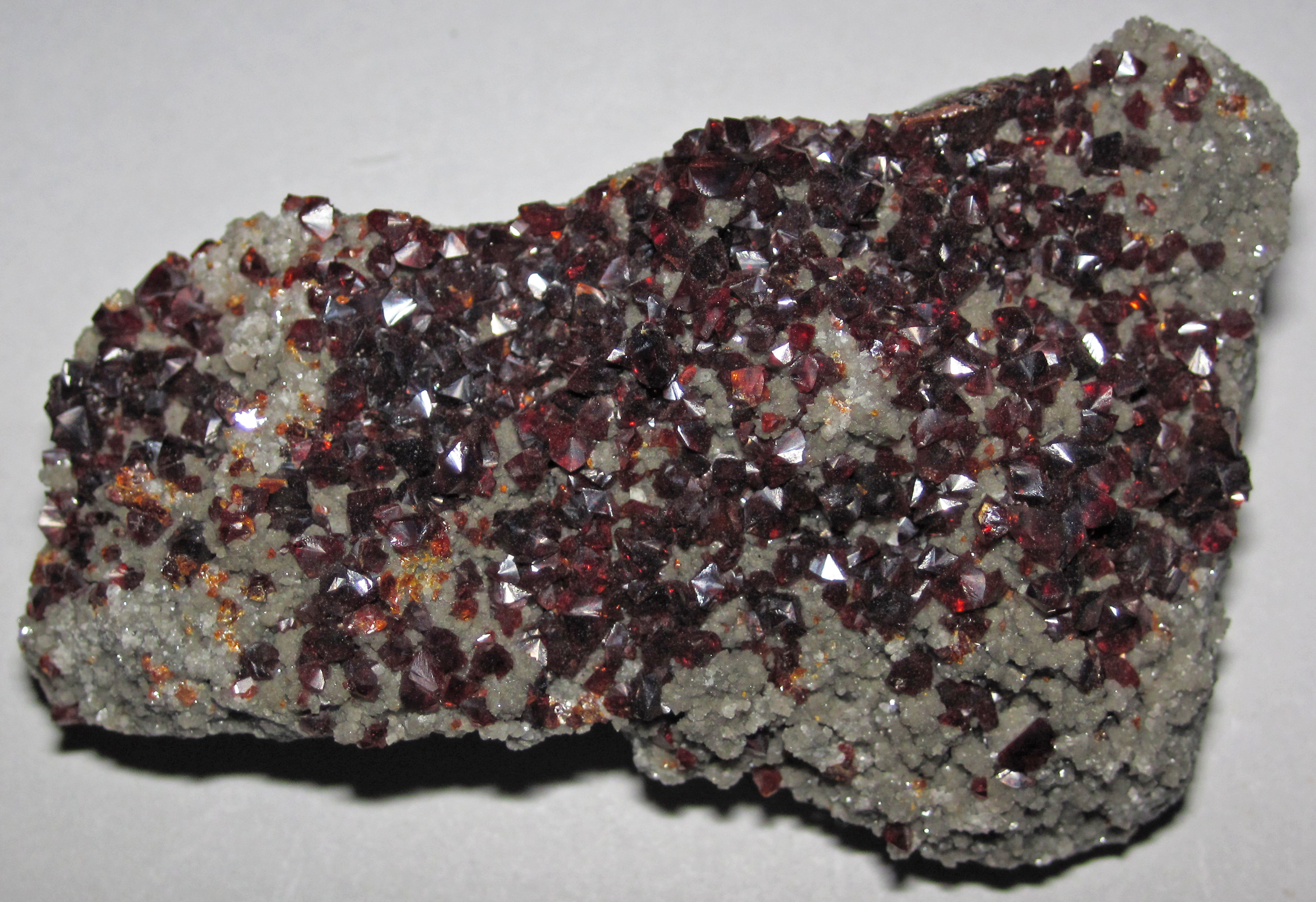
Sphalerite on dolostone, from Millersville Quarry, Ohio, US

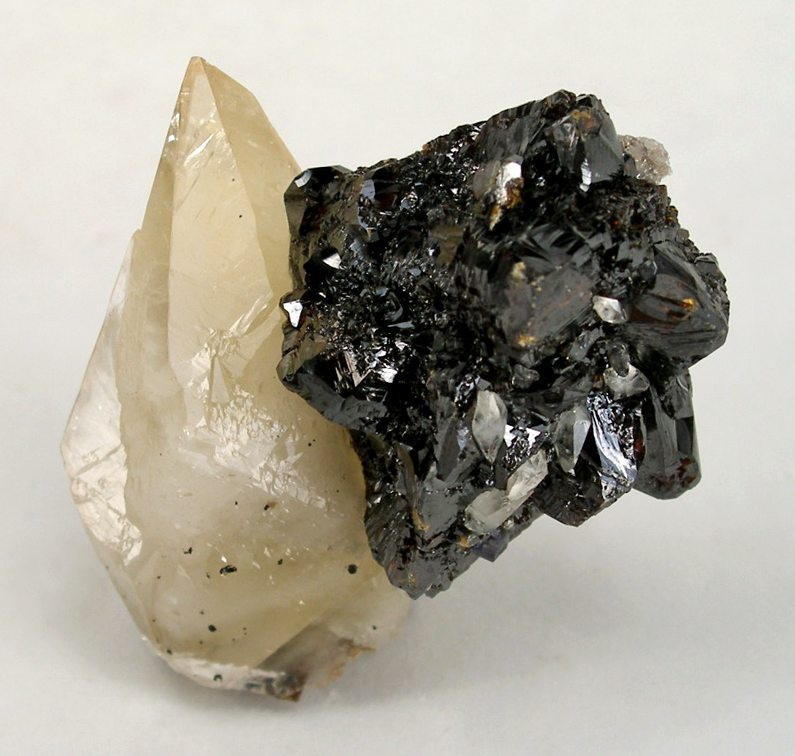
Tan crystal of calcite attached to a cluster of black sphalerite crystals

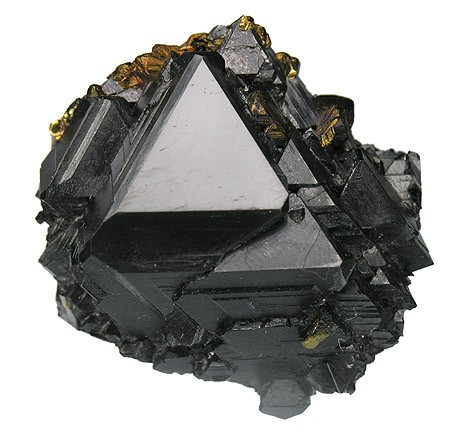
Sharp, tetrahedral sphalerite crystals with minor associated chalcopyrite from the Idarado Mine, Telluride, Ouray District, Colorado, US

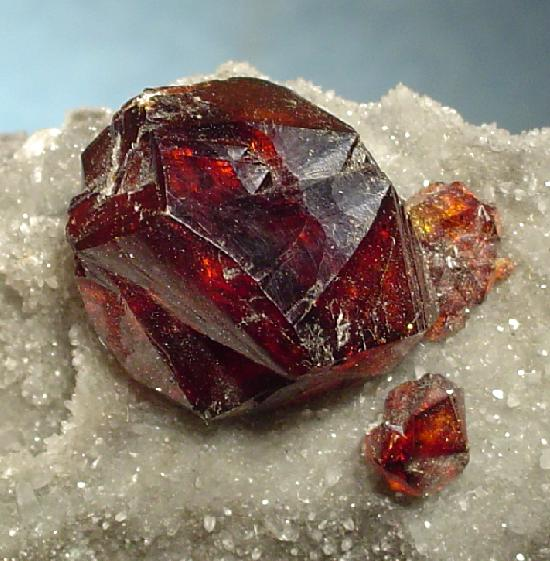
Gem quality twinned cherry-red sphalerite crystal (1.8 cm) from Hunan Province, China

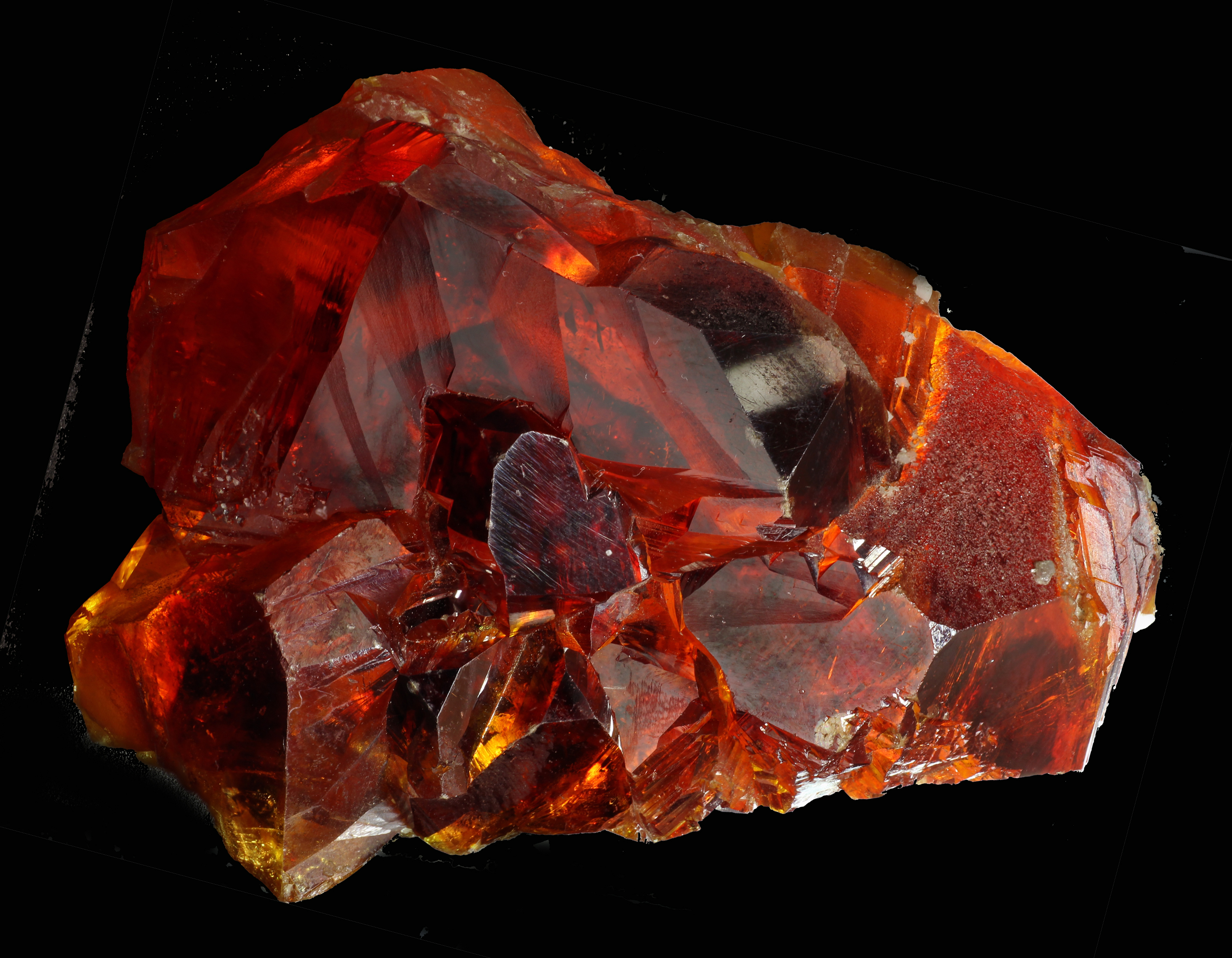
Sphalerite crystals from Áliva, Camaleño, Cantabria (Spain)

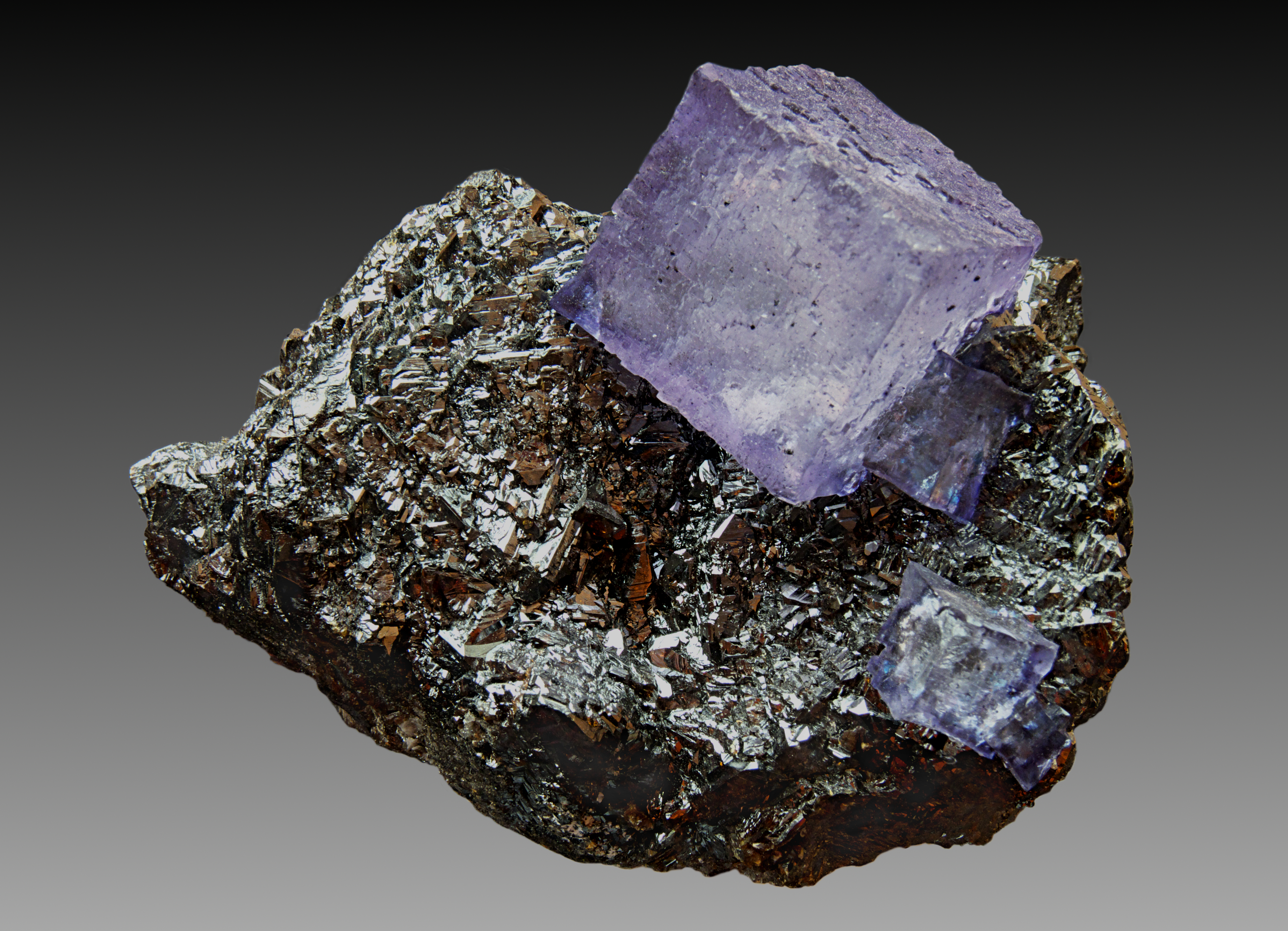
Purple fluorite and sphalerite, from the Elmwood mine, Smith county, Tennessee, US

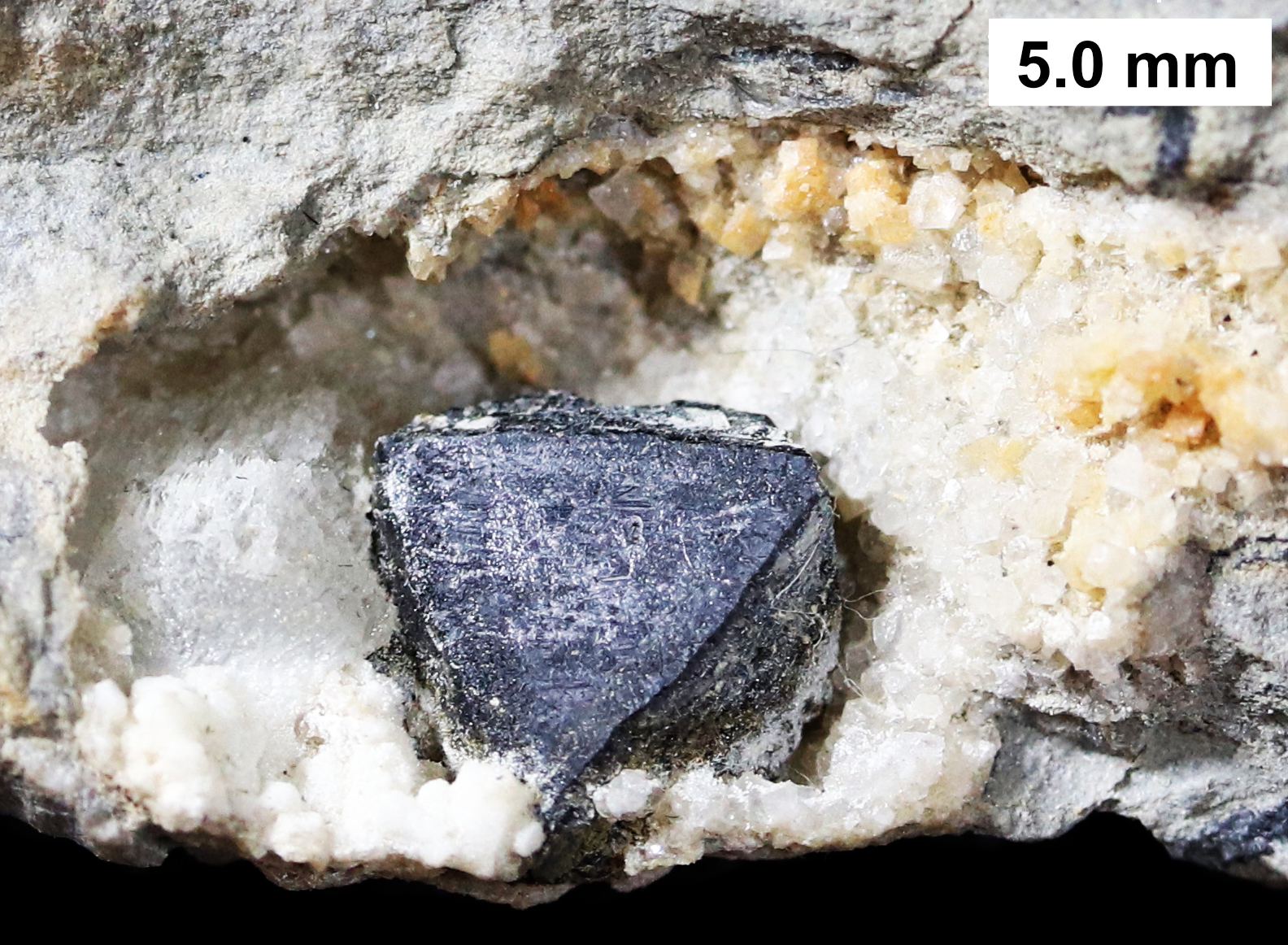
Sphalerite crystal in geodized brachiopod

== See also ==
- List of minerals
