= Proustite =

Sulfosalt mineral

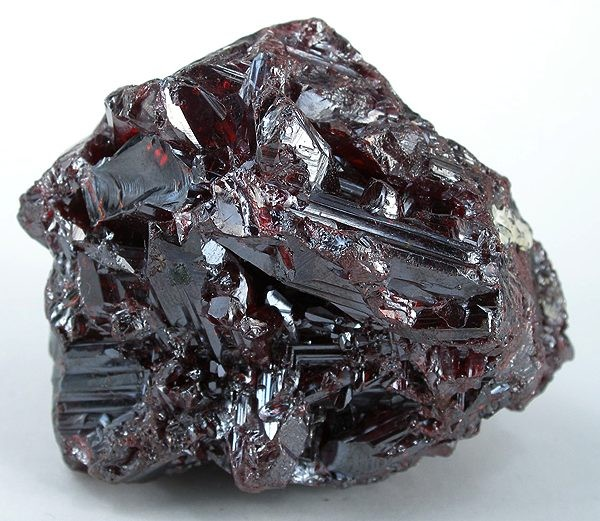

General
- Category: Sulfosalt minerals
- Formula: Ag_{3}AsS_{3}
- IMA symbol: Prs
- Strunz classification: 2.GA.05; Neso-sulfarsenites
- Dana classification: 03.04.01.01; Proustite group
- Crystal system: Trigonal
- Crystal class: Hexagonal scalenohedral (3̅m); H-M Symbol: (3̅ 2/m)
- Space group: R3̅c
- Unit cell: a = 10.79 Å, c = 8.69 Å; Z = 6

Identification
- Color: Scarlet-vermilion
- Crystal habit: Crystals prismatic and scalenohedral, massive, compact
- Twinning: Common
- Cleavage: Distinct on {101̅1}
- Fracture: Conchoidal to uneven
- Tenacity: Brittle
- Mohs scale hardness: 2 – 2.5
- Luster: Adamantine
- Streak: Vermilion
- Diaphaneity: Translucent, darkens when exposed to light
- Specific gravity: 5.57 measured, 5.625 calculated
- Optical properties: Uniaxial (−)
- Refractive index: n_{ω} = 3.087 – 3.088 n_{ε} = 2.792
- Birefringence: δ = 0.295 – 0.296
- Pleochroism: Moderate; cochineal-red to blood-red

Proustite is a sulfosalt mineral consisting of silver sulfarsenide, Ag_{3}AsS_{3}, known also as ruby blende, light red silver, arsenic-silver blende or ruby silver ore, and an important source of the metal. It is closely allied to the corresponding sulfantimonide, pyrargyrite, from which it was distinguished by the chemical analyses of Joseph L. Proust (1754–1826) in 1804, after whom the mineral received its name.

The prismatic crystals are often terminated by the scalenohedron and the obtuse rhombohedron, thus resembling calcite (dog-tooth-spar) in habit. The color is scarlet-vermilion and the luster adamantine; crystals are transparent and very brilliant, but on exposure to light they soon become dull black and opaque. The streak is scarlet, the hardness 2 to 2.5, and the specific gravity 5.57. Its transparency differs from specimen to specimen, but most are opaque or translucent.

Proustite occurs in hydrothermal deposits as a phase in the oxidized and supergene zone. It is associated with other silver minerals and sulfides such as native silver, native arsenic, xanthoconite, stephanite, acanthite, tetrahedrite and chlorargyrite.

Magnificent groups of large crystals have been found at Chañarcillo in Chile; other localities which have yielded fine specimens are Freiberg and Marienberg in Saxony, Joachimsthal in Bohemia and Sainte-Marie-aux-Mines in Alsace.

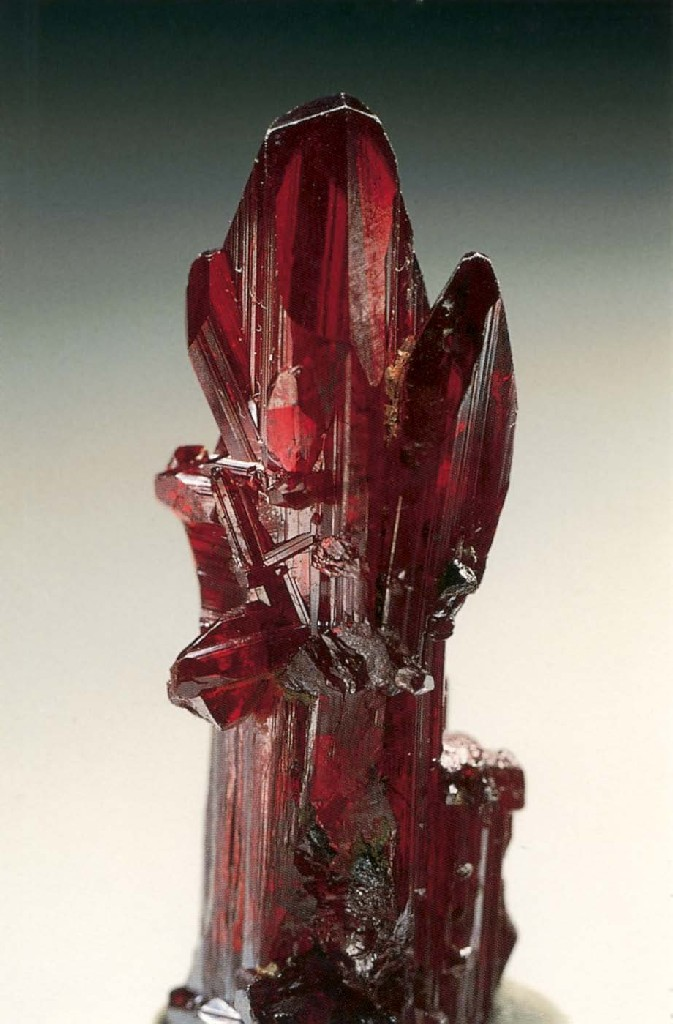
Proustite (long prismatic crystal) – Chañarcillo, Copiapo Province, Chile. Specimen height is 4 cm.

== Structure ==
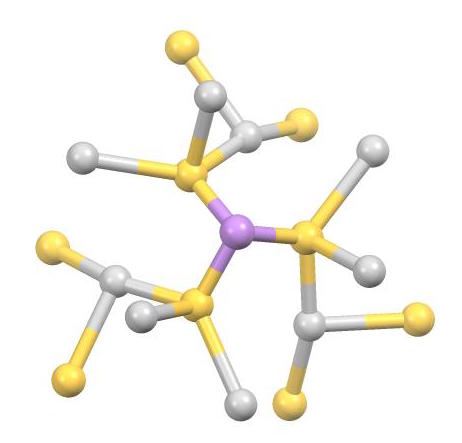
Subunit of the proustite structure, showing the connectivity of Ag, As (violet), S.

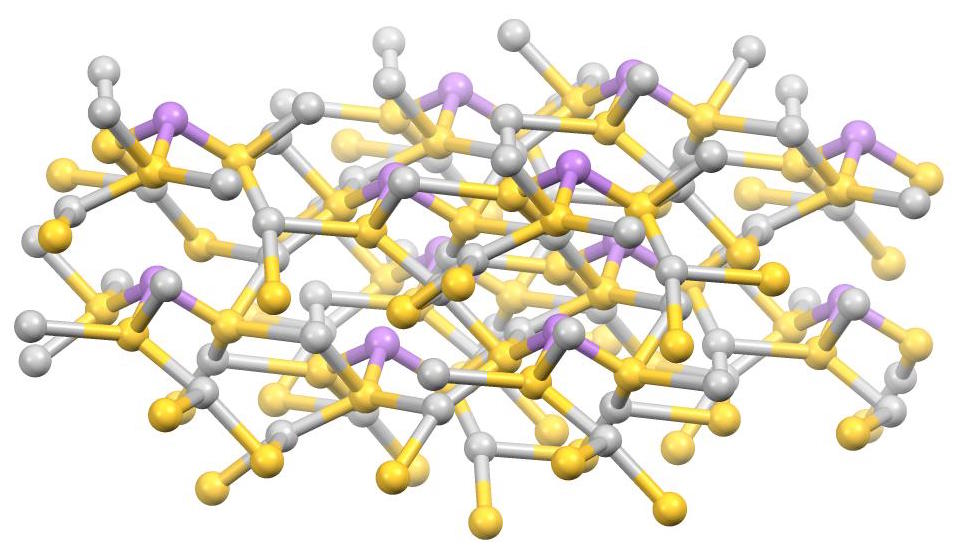
The structure of proustite can be viewed as the Ag^{+} derivative of [AsS_{3}]^{3−}.

== See also ==
- List of minerals
- List of minerals named after people
