= Xanthoconite =

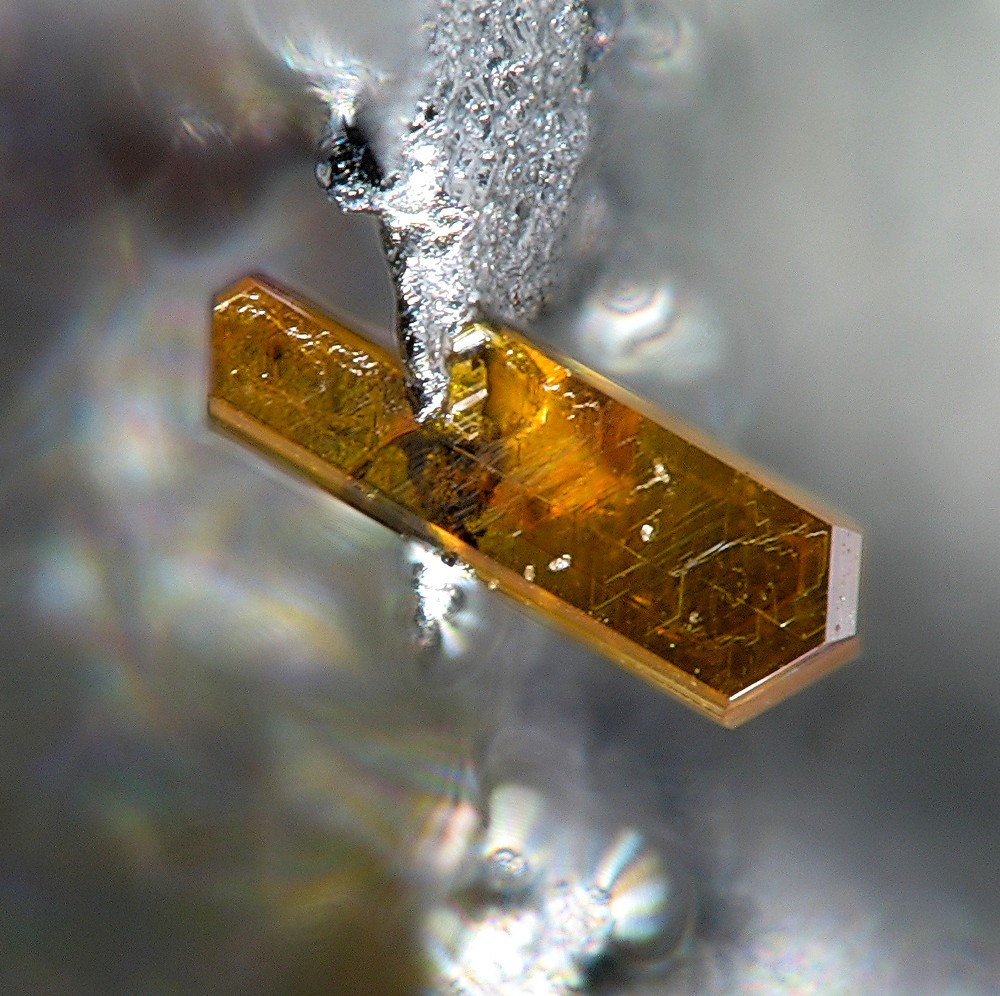
- Xanthoconite from Imiter Mine, Boumalne-Dadès, Ouarzazate Province, Souss-Massa-Draâ Region, Morocco

General
- Category: Sulfosalt mineral
- Formula: Ag_{3}AsS_{3}
- IMA symbol: Xcn
- Strunz classification: 2.GA.10
- Crystal system: Monoclinic
- Crystal class: Prismatic (2/m) (same H-M symbol)
- Space group: C2/c

Identification
- Formula mass: 494.72 g/mol
- Color: Red-orange; Lemon yellow
- Mohs scale hardness: 2.5–3.0
- Luster: Adamantine
- Diaphaneity: Subtranslucent – opaque
- Specific gravity: 5.54, range 5.5–5.6

Xanthoconite is a sulfosalt mineral with the chemical formula Ag_{3}AsS_{3}.
