= Kepner =

Kepner is a surname. Notable people with the surname include:

- Jeff Kepner, American hand transplant recipient
- Jim Kepner (1923–1997), American journalist, author, historian, archivist and leader in the gay rights movement
- William Ellsworth Kepner (1893–1982), American officer in the United States Army, United States Army Air Corps and United States Air Force, balloonist, and airship pilot

Fictional characters with the surname include:

- April Kepner, a character on Grey's Anatomy
