= Miargyrite =

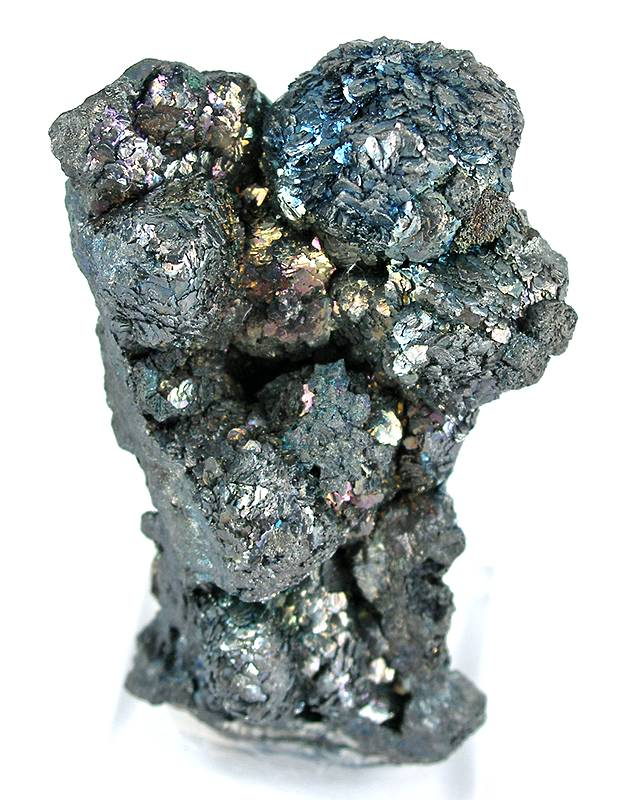
- Miargyrite, San Genaro Mine, Castrovirreyna District, Peru (size: 6.1 × 4.2 × 2.7 cm).

General
- Category: Minerals
- Formula: AgSbS_{2}
- IMA symbol: May
- Strunz classification: 2.HA.10
- Crystal system: Monoclinic
- Crystal class: Prismatic (2/m) (same H-M symbol)
- Space group: C2/c

Identification
- Mohs scale hardness: 2–2 1/2
- Streak: red
- Specific gravity: 5.2
- Melting point: 514°C

Miargyrite, formerly known as ruby blende or garnet blende is a mineral, a sulfide of silver and antimony with the formula AgSbS_{2}. It is a dimorph of cuboargyrite. Originally discovered in the Freiberg district of Germany in 1824, it has subsequently been found in many places where silver is mined. It usually occurs in low temperature hydrothermal deposits. and forms black metallic crystals which may show a dark red internal reflection. The streak is also red.

Miargyrite is named from the Greek meyon, "smaller" and argyros, "silver", as its silver content is lower than most silver sulfides.
