= Matthew Kepnes =

American travel blogger

- Born: June 12, 1981 (age 45); Boston, Massachusetts, U.S.
- Occupation: Travel writer

Matthew Kepnes is an American travel blogger also known by his online alias Nomadic Matt.

Kepnes was born in Boston. He attended the University of Massachusetts to become a history teacher and graduated in 2003. At 23, he had never left the United States but in 2005 he took a trip to Thailand. The trip convinced Kepnes to quit his job, finish his MBA, and begin traveling the world and blogging about his experiences.

Kepnes' first book, How to Travel the World on $50 a Day: Travel Cheaper, Longer, Smarter, was published in 2013 by Penguin. A second edition was published in 2015 and was a New York Times bestseller. He used an initial coin offering to crowdfund his eBook Nomadic Matt's Guide to Backpacking Europe in 2018. In July 2019, Kepnes published his memoir, Ten Years a Nomad: A Traveler's Journey Home.

Kepnes has traveled to more than 100 countries.
