= Pyrargyrite =

Sulfosalt mineral of silver and antimony

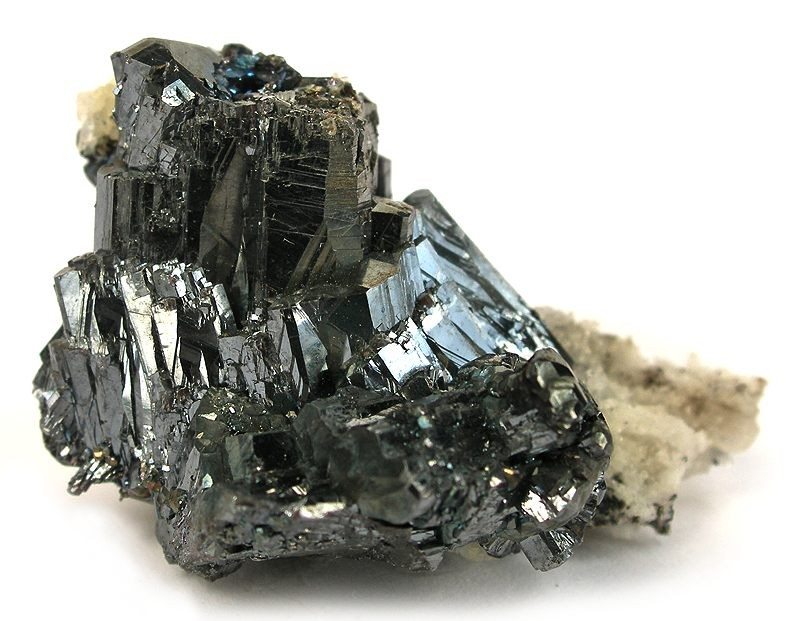

General
- Category: Sulfosalt
- Formula: Ag_{3}SbS_{3}
- IMA symbol: Pyg
- Strunz classification: 2.GA.05
- Crystal system: Trigonal
- Crystal class: Ditrigonal pyramidal (3m) (same H-M symbol)
- Space group: R3c
- Unit cell: a = 11.047 Å, c = 8.719 Å; Z = 6

Identification
- Color: Deep red to red gray
- Crystal habit: Include prismatic crystals with rhombohedral and scalenohedral faces forming terminations. massive, granular
- Twinning: Complex to lammellar
- Cleavage: Distinct on {101̅1}, imperfect on {011̅2}
- Fracture: Conchoidal, uneven
- Tenacity: Brittle
- Mohs scale hardness: 2.5
- Luster: Adamantine
- Streak: dark cherry red
- Diaphaneity: Translucent to nearly opaque
- Specific gravity: 5.82
- Optical properties: Uniaxial (–)
- Refractive index: n_{ω} = 3.084 n_{ε} = 2.881
- Birefringence: δ = 0.203
- Pleochroism: Distinct
- Other characteristics: Darkens upon exposure to light; crystals are frequently striated

Pyrargyrite is a sulfosalt mineral consisting of silver sulfantimonite, Ag_{3}SbS_{3}. Known also as dark red silver ore, ruby blende, garnete blende or ruby silver, it is an important source of the metal.

It is closely allied to, and isomorphous with, the corresponding sulfarsenide known as proustite or light red silver ore. Ruby silver or red silver ore (German Rotgültigerz) was mentioned by Georg Agricola in 1546, but the two species so closely resemble one another that they were not completely distinguished until chemical analyses of both were made.

Both crystallize in the ditrigonal pyramidal (hemimorphic-hemihedral) class of the rhombohedral system, possessing the same degree of symmetry as tourmaline. Crystals are perfectly developed and are usually prismatic in habit; they are frequently attached at one end, the hemimorphic character being then evident by the fact that the oblique striations on the prism faces are directed towards one end only of the crystal. Twinning according to several laws is not uncommon. The hexagonal prisms of pyrargyrite are usually terminated by a low hexagonal pyramid or by a drusy basal plane.

The color of pyrargyrite is usually greyish-black and the lustre metallic-adamantine; large crystals are opaque, but small ones and thin splinters are deep ruby-red by transmitted light, hence the name, from the Greek pyr and argyros, "fire-silver" in allusion to color and silver content, given by E. F. Glocker in 1831. The streak is purplish-red, thus differing markedly from the scarlet streak of proustite and affording a ready means of distinguishing the two minerals. The Mohs hardness is 2.75, and the specific gravity 5.85. The refractive indices (nω = 3.084 nε = 2.881) and birefringence (δ = 0.203) are very high. There is no very distinct cleavage and the fracture is conchoidal. The mineral occurs in metalliferous veins with calcite, argentiferous galena, native silver, native arsenic, etc. The best crystallized specimens are from Sankt Andreasberg in the Harz, Freiberg in Saxony, and Guanajuato in Mexico. Very high-quality pyrargyrite specimens were also found in the silver mines of Guadalcanal (Seville) and Hiendelaencina (Guadalajara), in Spain. It is not uncommon in many silver mines in the United States, but rarely as distinct crystals; and it has been found in some Cornish mines.

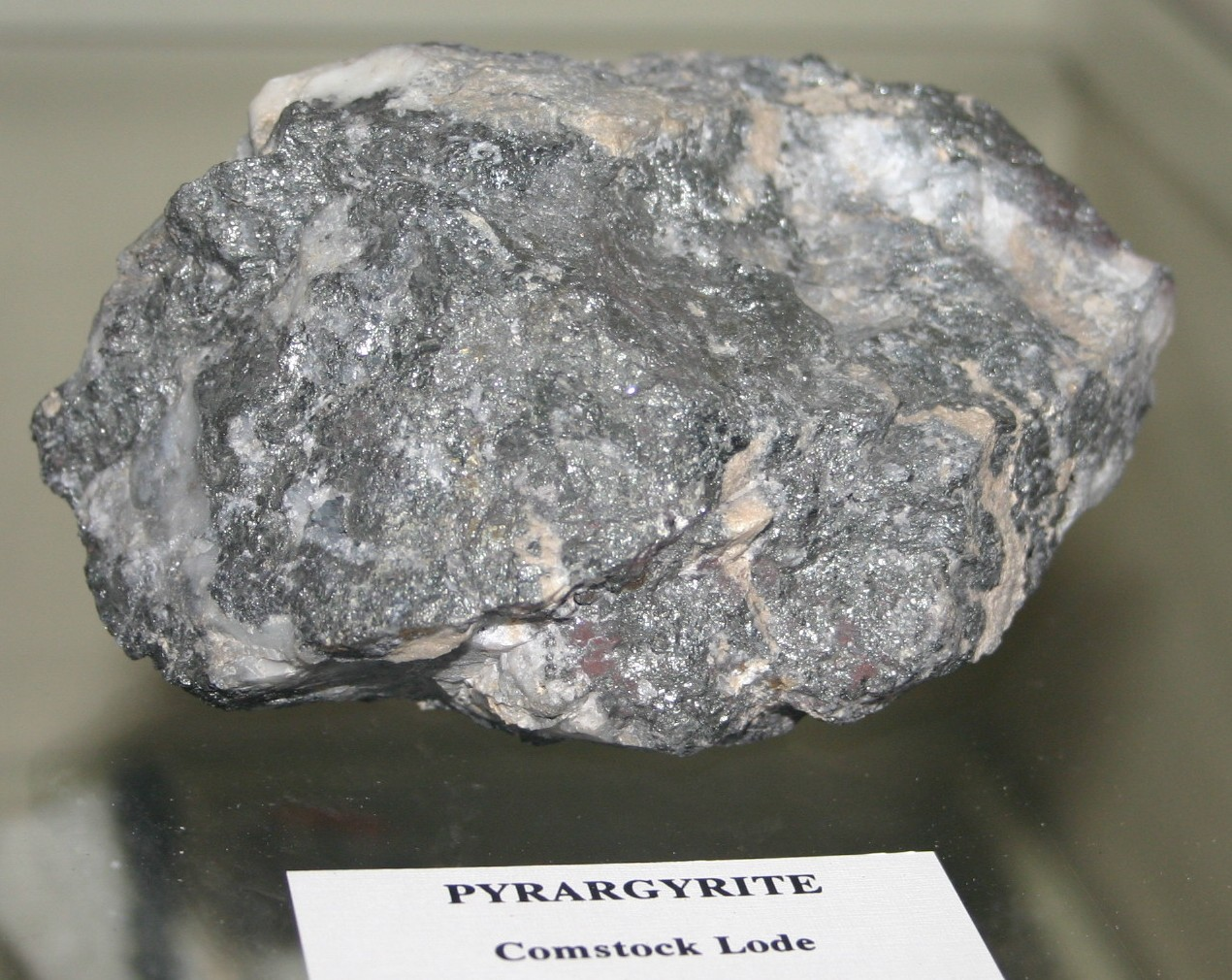
Pyrargyrite silver ore from the Comstock Lode, Storey Co., Nevada, US

Although the red silver ores afford a good example of isomorphism, they rarely form mixtures; pyrargyrite rarely contains as much as 3% of arsenic replacing antimony, and the same is true of antimony in proustite. Dimorphous with pyrargyrite and proustite respectively are the rare monoclinic species pyrostilpnite or fireblende (Ag_{3}SbS_{3}) and xanthoconite (Ag_{3}AsS_{3}): these four minerals thus form an isodimorphous group.
