= Moroccan manuscripts =

Moroccan manuscripts refers to documents traditionally written by hand rather than printed or typed from the Kingdom of Morocco. Manuscript production in Morocco was highly regulated by the ‘ulama, an authoritative body of Muslim scholars versed in Islamic law, who saw that manuscripts adhered to the Maliki school of law in Sunni Islam. The muhtasib, or market inspector, similarly ensured the quality of the ink, paper, and handwriting of manuscripts met Islamic and/or moral code in public markets.

== Manuscripts ==
=== Script ===
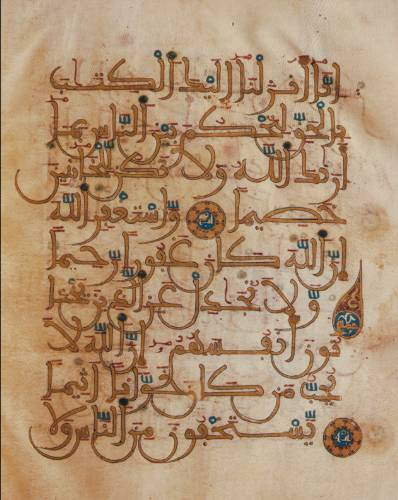
Example of Maghribi script in a Qur'anic manuscript.

The Maghribi script, developed from Kufic in the Maghreb and al-Andalus, was the standard system for handwriting in Morocco. Most manuscripts are written in the Andalusi script, a school of Maghribi; however, Berber writing systems were commonly used in southern parts of the Kingdom. Additional styles within the Maghribi script can be found in Moroccan manuscripts as well, including mujawar, mabsut, and zimani. Naskh script was occasionally used for a manuscript’s title page and/or chapter headings.

=== Materiality ===
Analytical studies of Moroccan manuscripts have identified coloring materials used to make ink between the 10th and 19th centuries. Black ink was regularly used for writing the main body of text in manuscripts. Iron-based black ink is more commonly found throughout manuscripts than carbon ink, seemingly due to the ink’s permanency and legibility. In addition to decoration, colored ink was often used for identifying headings and marking text. Cinnabar or vermilion made red inks while carmine was used for pink tones. Blue ink came from either azurite, lazurite, and/or indigo, and green was often a mixture of orpiment and indigo. However, other studies have found copper-based green ink in Moroccan manuscripts. Orpiment, realgar, and occasionally vermilion made up most brown, yellow, and orange inks.

=== Genres ===
Moroccan manuscripts may be religious, including Islamic and Jewish texts, or secular works.

==== Islamic manuscripts ====
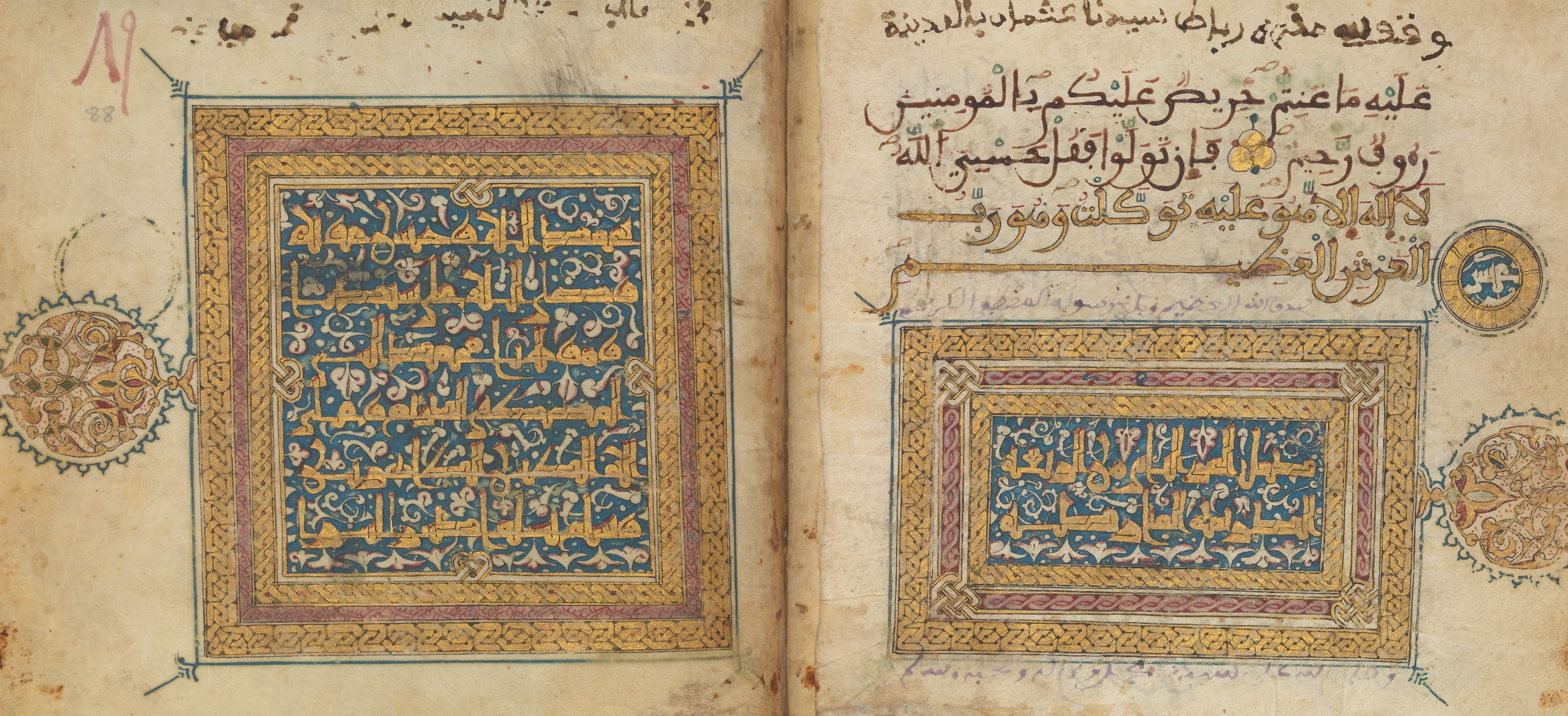
A section from a Qur'an manuscript, ca. 1300.

Hadith literature was one of the largest genres of Islamic manuscripts produced under the Alaouite dynasty in the 19th century, especially the Sahih al-Bukhari and its shuruh (“explanations”). The Sahih was first introduced to Morocco in the 11th century, and it is regarded as the second most important text after the Qur’an. The Sahih became especially salient under the Sa’dids in the 17th century. According to Dr. Fawzi Abdulrazak, a leading scholar on the history of printing in Morocco, the Sultan’s used the Sahih al-Bukhari as a tool in times of political crisis and war. As a descendant of the Prophet, the Sahih was seen as an extension of authority and legitimacy. The Sahih was often read in public by the ‘Ulama.

Islamic jurisprudence (fiqh) was another common type of Islamic manuscript. The Mukhtasar by Khalil ibn Ishaq al-Jundi is highly regarded in the Maliki madhhab, and it is an authoritative source of law in Morocco. al-Jundi’s mukhtasar had replaced Sahnun ibn Sa'id ibn Habib at-Tanuki's al-Mudawwana al-Kubra by the 18th century. Manuscripts with commentary on the Mukhtasar were produced as well.

Religious monasteries (zawiyah) produced many Sufi manuscripts, as well as their own prayer texts.

== Introduction of the Printing Press ==
The first lithographic printing press was introduced to Morocco by Muhammad al-Tayyib al-Rudani in 1864. al-Rudani bought the press in Cairo, and he contracted Muhammad al-Qabbani, an Egyptian printer, to work it for the first year. However, the press was confiscated by the authorities shortly after al-Rudani’s return to Morocco. al-Rudani died in 1865, before Morocco’s first printed book was completed later that year in Meknes. Upon completion, the printing press was moved to Zanqat Jaza’ Barquqah in Fez, where it remained until the mid-20th century. Muhammad al-Tayyib al-Azraq, a student of al-Qabbani, is recognized as Morocco’s first professional lithographic printer. The government owned all printing presses in Morocco until 1871, when private ownership was first authorized. However, printed books continued to be heavily regulated. In 1897, Sultan Mulai Abd al-Aziz tasked qadi, or magistrates and judges, with sanctioning the publication of books before they were printed. This dahir also led to the standardization of colophons as well, including documentation of when (ie. the date) a book was printed, and the names of all printers and publishers involved.

Typographical printing was introduced to Morocco in 1906.
