= Blending =

Blending may refer to:

- The process of mixing in process engineering
- Mixing paints to achieve a greater range of colors
- Blending (alcohol production), a technique to produce alcoholic beverages by mixing different brews
- Blending (linguistics), the process of forming a word from two or more letters that represent the sounds of a word
- Blending (music), a technique used in instrument playing
- Blending (vocal technique), a technique used in vocal warm up
- Blending curves, in mathematics
- Blending inheritance, a hypothetical model prior to the discovery of genetics
- Alpha blending, a transparency technique in computer image generation
- Conceptual blending, a general theory of cognition
- Gas blending, the filling of diving cylinders with non-air breathing gases such as nitrox, trimix and heliox
- Tea blending, the process of blending different teas to produce a final product
- The Blending (novel series), a fantasy series by Sharon Green
- Travel blending, a technique, developed in Australia, for encouraging people to make more efficient and environmentally sound transportation choices
- Blending in hairstyling, a technique used to transition between different hair lengths smoothly.

== See also ==
- Blend (disambiguation)
