= Claudetite =

Arsenic oxide mineral

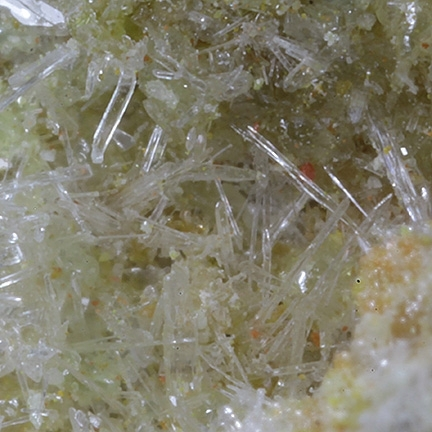

General
- Category: Oxide minerals
- Formula: As_{2} O_{3}
- IMA symbol: Ctd
- Strunz classification: 4.CB.45
- Crystal system: Monoclinic
- Crystal class: Prismatic (2/m) (same H-M symbol)
- Space group: P2_{1}/n
- Unit cell: a = 5.33 Å, b = 12.98 Å, c = 4.54 Å; β = 94.27°; Z = 4

Identification
- Color: Colorless to white
- Crystal habit: Thin tabular crystals, fibrous crusts
- Twinning: Contact or penetration on {100}
- Cleavage: Perfect on {010} micaceous
- Fracture: Splintery
- Tenacity: Flexible
- Mohs scale hardness: 2.15
- Luster: Vitreous, pearly on cleavage surfaces
- Diaphaneity: Transparent
- Specific gravity: 4.14–4.15
- Optical properties: Biaxial (−)
- Refractive index: n_{α} = 1.870 n_{β} = 1.920 n_{γ} = 2.010
- Birefringence: δ = 0.140
- 2V angle: 58° (measured)

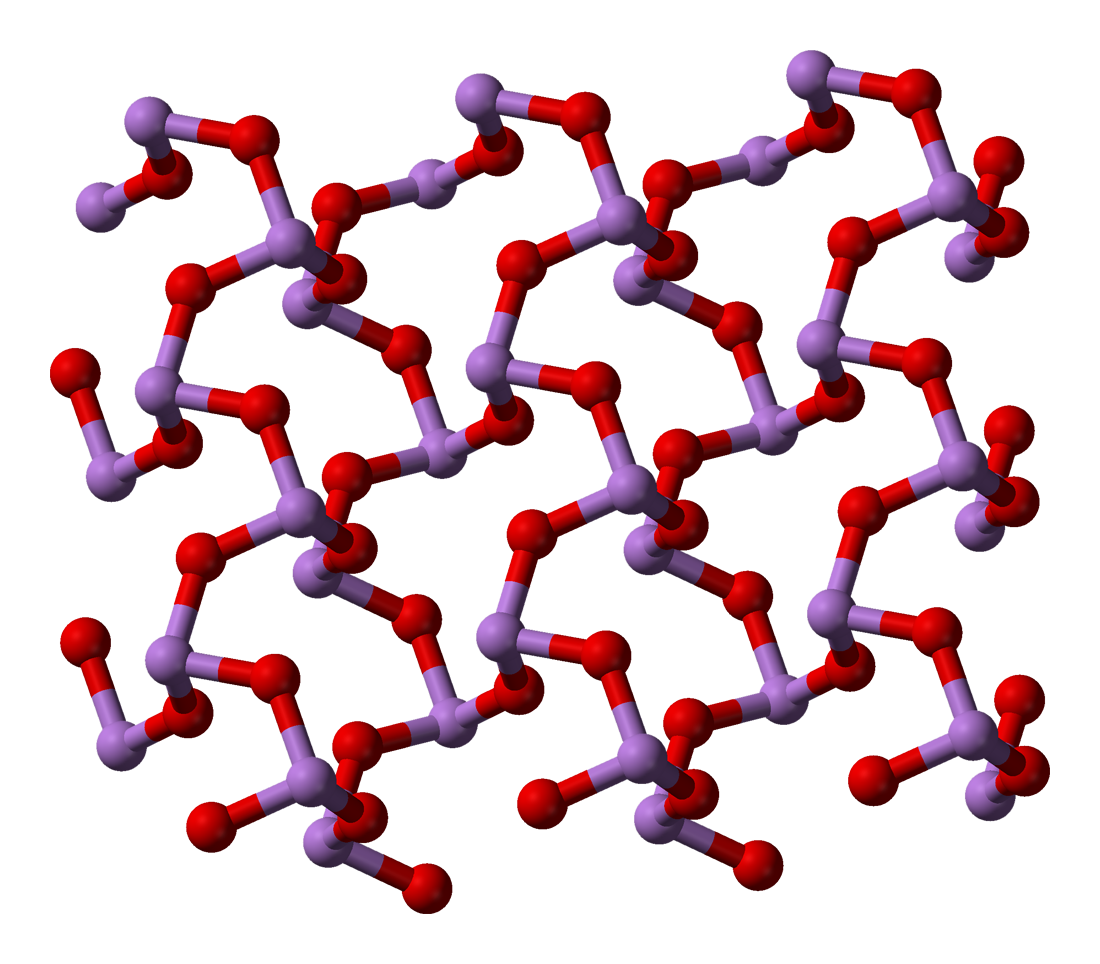

Claudetite is an arsenic oxide mineral with chemical formula As_{2}O_{3}. Claudetite is formed as an oxidation product of arsenic sulfides and is colorless or white. It can be associated with arsenolite (the cubic form of As_{2}O_{3}) as well as realgar (As_{4}S_{4}), orpiment (As_{2}S_{3}) and native sulfur.

It was first described in 1868 for an occurrence in the San Domingo mines, Algarve, Portugal. It was first described by and named for the French chemist Frederick Claudet.
