= Blend =

A blend is a mixture of two or more different substances.

Blend may also refer to:

== Arts and entertainment ==
- Blend (album), a 1996 album by BoDeans
- The Blend (Sirius XM), a North American satellite radio channel
- "Blend", a 2017 song on Party (Aldous Harding album)

== Computing ==
- .blend (file format), used by Blender, a 3D graphics tool
- Microsoft Blend, a UI design tool for WPF and Silverlight

== Linguistics ==
- Blend word, a word formed from parts of other words
- Consonant blend, a cluster of consonants without an intervening vowel

== Other uses ==
- Blend (cigarette), a Swedish brand
- Blend (textile), made from two or more fibers

== See also ==
- Polymer blend, a member of a class of materials analogous to metal alloys
- Blended (film), a 2014 film starring Adam Sandler and Drew Barrymore
- Blender (disambiguation)
- Blending (disambiguation)
- Blende (disambiguation)
