= Paint mixing =

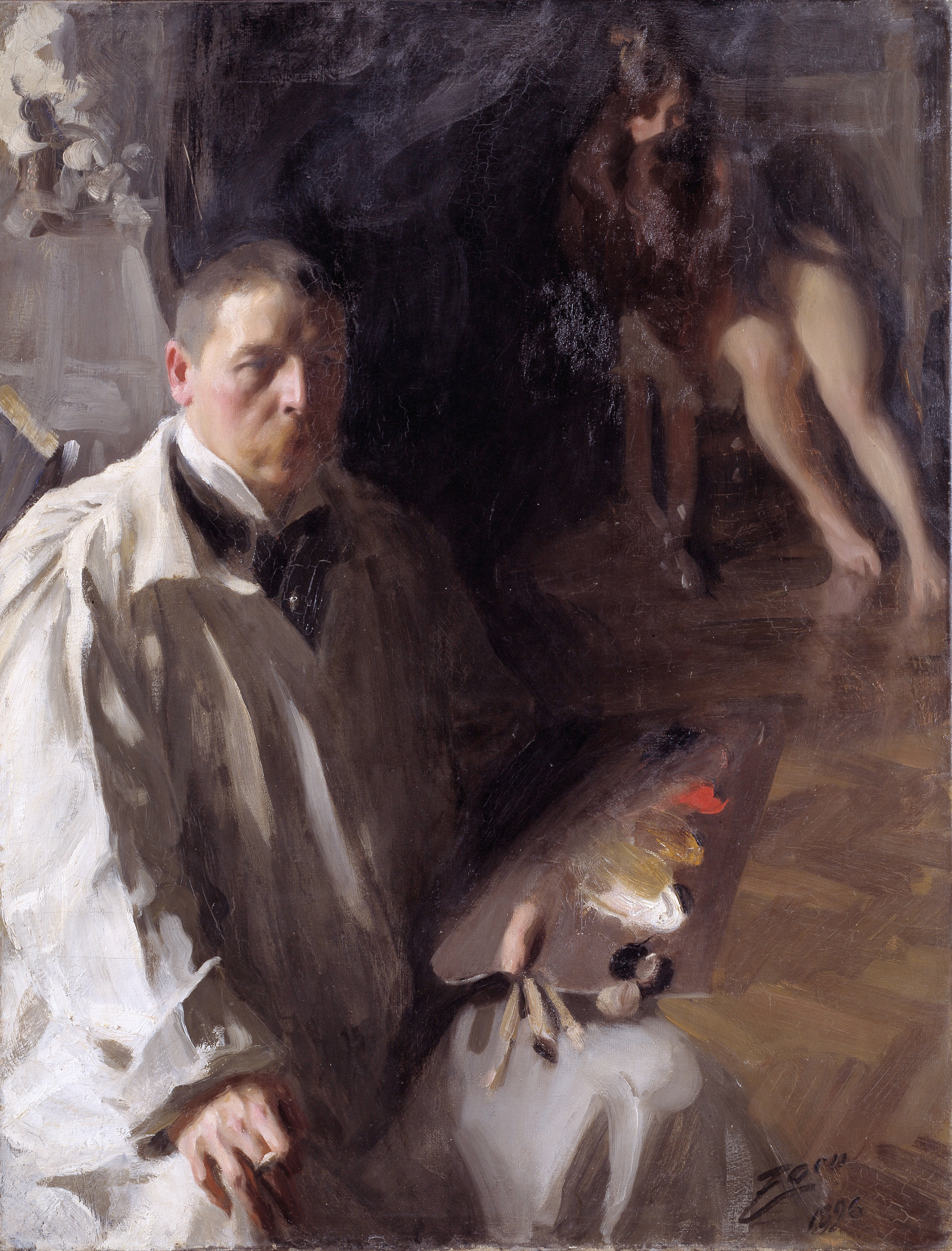
A self-portrait by Anders Zorn clearly showing a four pigment palette of what are thought to be white, yellow ochre, red vermilion and black pigments.

Paint mixing is the practice of mixing components or colors of paint to combine them into a working material and achieve a desired hue. The components that go into paint mixing depend on the function of the product sought to be produced. For example, a painter of portraits or scenery on a canvas may be seeking delicate hues and subtle gradiations, while the painter of a house may be more concerned with durability and consistency of colors in paints presented to customers, and the painter of a bridge or a ship may have the weatherability of the paint as their primary concern.

== History ==
Mixing pigments for the purpose of creating realistic paintings with diverse color gamuts is known to have been practiced at least since Ancient Greece. The identity of a/the set of minimal pigments to mix diverse gamuts has long been the subject of speculation by theorists whose claims have changed over time, for example Pliny's white, black, one or another red, and "sil", which might have been yellow or blue; Robert Boyle's white, black, red, yellow, and blue; and variations with more or fewer "primary" color or pigments. Some writers and artists have found these schemes difficult to reconcile with the actual practice of painting. Nonetheless, it has long been known that limited palettes consisting of a small set of pigments are sufficient to mix a diverse gamut of colors.

In the 1910 edition of his treatise on the subject, Paint and Color Mixing, Seymour Arthur Jennings noted:

If half a dozen practical painters, experienced in color mixing, were asked separately to mix a given color, say sea green, it is almost certain that when the six colors were compared there would be no two alike. Each of the six painters might have precisely the same make of colors to work with, and yet the sea green in each case would be different. The explanation, of course, is that opinions differ as to what is sea green.

To remedy this, Jennings included sample cards showing 48 different colors, and described the method of mixing these and other colors, and for mixing graining grounds and testing colors. Jennings recommended that painters offering paints for commercial uses should similarly employ cards to explain color options to their customers, so the customer would not be surprised by the result.

In the 1920s, radioluminescent paint was developed by mixing small amounts of a radioactive isotope (radionuclide) with a radioluminescent phosphor chemical, but the radium originally used for this purpose was discovered to be harmful, leading to the use of promethium and tritium for this purpose. In the 1930s, blacklight paint was invented by brothers Joseph and Robert Switzer; Robert had severed an optic nerve due to a head injury, and was confined him to a dark room while he waited for his sight to recover. Joseph, who was a chemistry major at the University of California, Berkeley, worked with Robert to investigate fluorescent compounds. They brought a blacklight into the storeroom of their father's drugstore looking for naturally fluorescing organic compounds and mixed those compounds with shellac to develop the first black light fluorescent paints.

== Methods and techniques ==
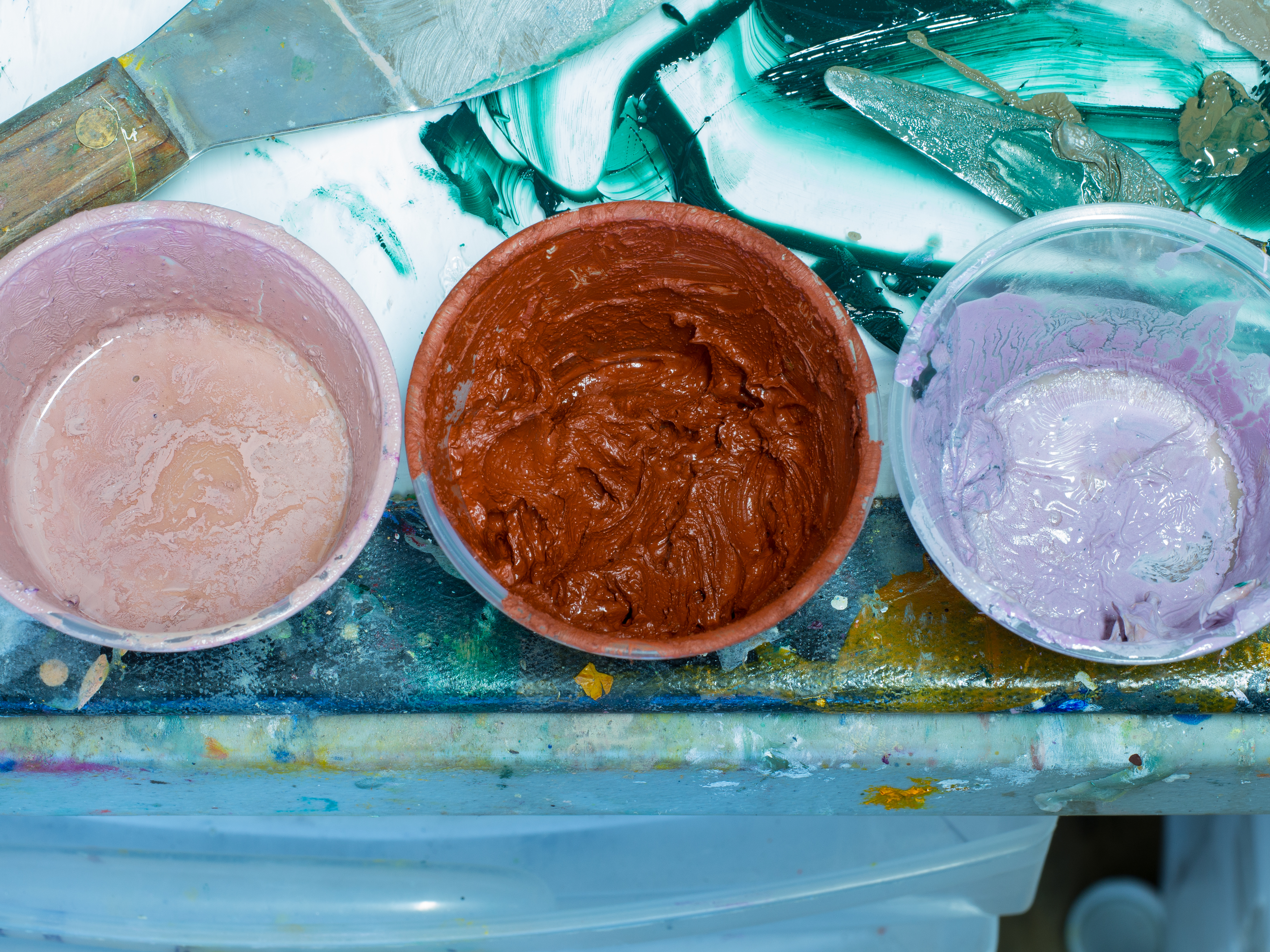
Three oil paints, one of which is mixed with wax

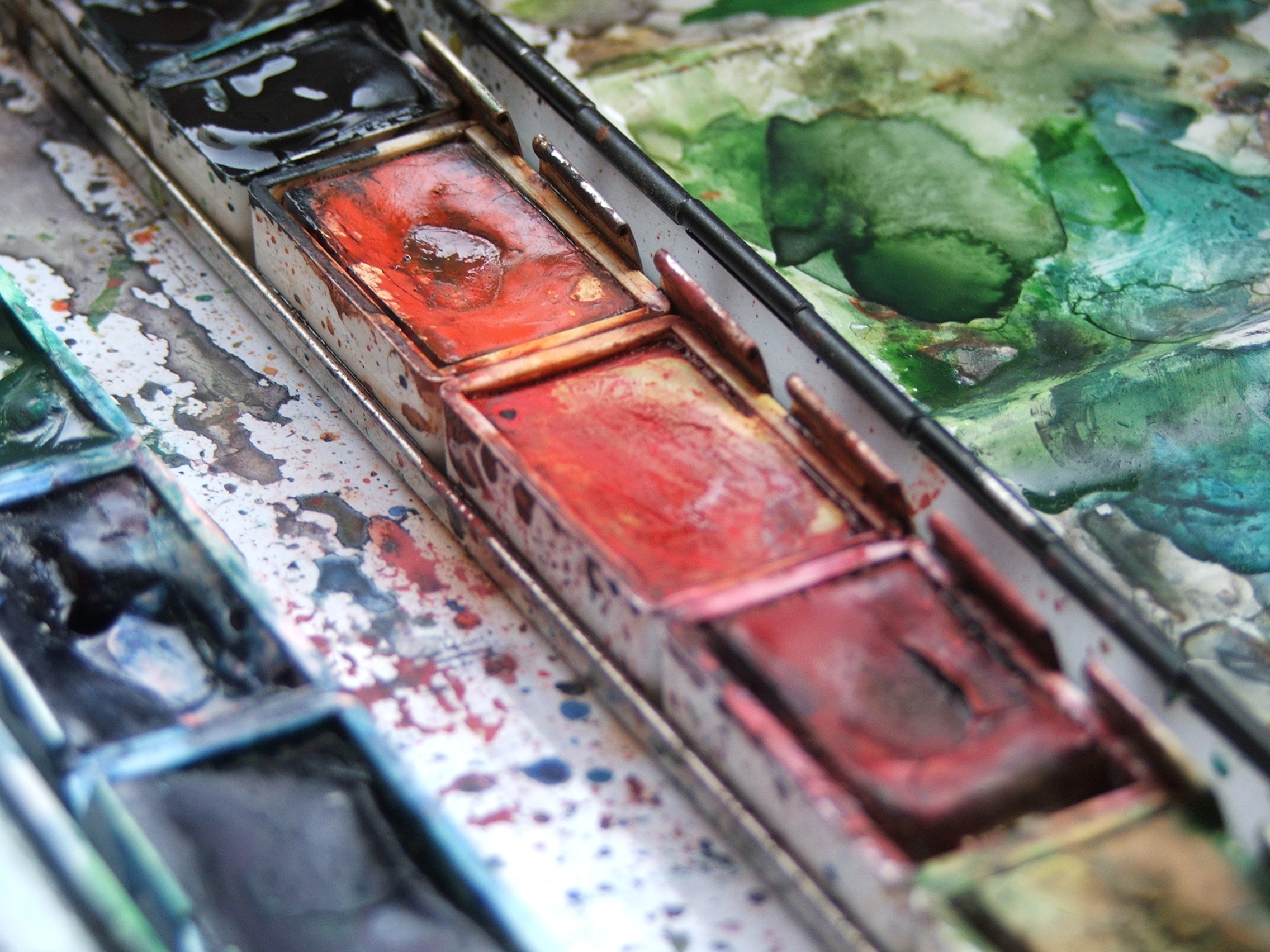
A set of watercolors

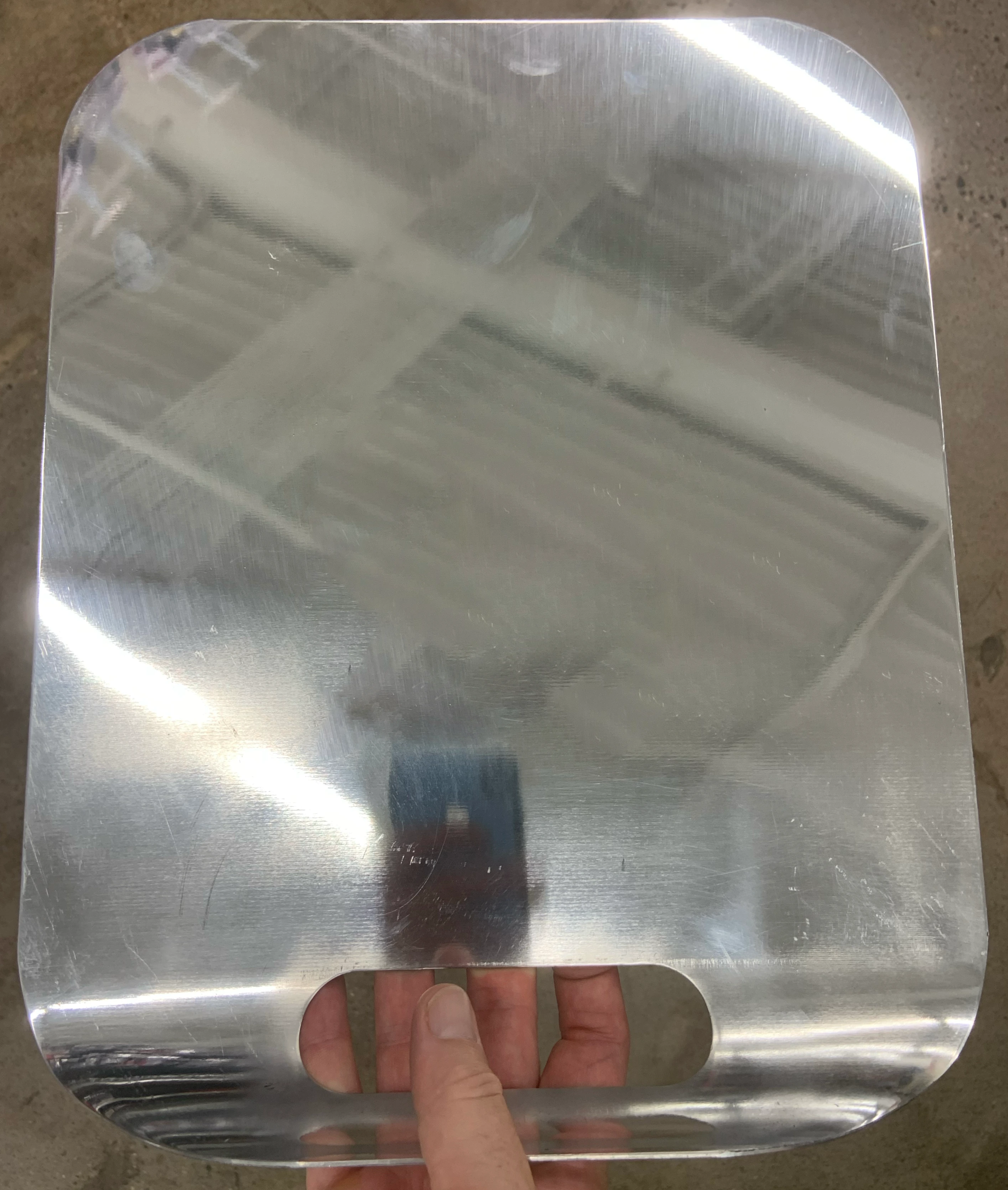
Paint mixing board

Acrylic artists' paints may be thinned with water or acrylic medium and used as washes in the manner of watercolor paints, but unlike watercolor the washes are not rehydratable once dry. For this reason, acrylics do not lend themselves to the color lifting techniques of gum arabic-based watercolor paints. Instead, the paint is applied in layers, sometimes diluting with water or acrylic medium to allow layers underneath to partially show through. Using an acrylic medium gives the paint more of a rich and glossy appearance, whereas using water makes the paint look more like watercolor and have a matte finish. Research has determined that "mixing durable paints with less durable paints can enhance the durability of the mixture". In particular, "all paints whether durable or not will develop considerably enhanced durability if they are applied over a white lead ground", and mixtures of other paints with a white paint pigmented with lead carbonate and zinc oxide "developed the greatest strength even after drying for only a short time when compared to the much older paints".

Many paints tend to separate when stored, the heavier components settling to the bottom, and therefore require mixing before use. A machine called a paint shaker can be used to achieve either effect by shaking the can vigorously for a few minutes. A wide variety of paint shakers are available. In the 1980s, a home-use version was sold that attached to an electric drill, using vibrations from the drill to mix the paint.

== Mixing paints in limited palettes ==
The set of pigments available to mix diverse gamuts of color (in various media such as oil, watercolor, acrylic, gouache, and pastel) is large and has changed throughout history. There is no consensus on a specific set of pigments that are considered primary colors – the choice of pigments depends entirely on the artist's subjective preference of subject and style of art as well as material considerations like lightfastness and mixing behavior. A variety of limited palettes have been employed by artists for their work.

The color of light (i.e., the spectral power distribution) reflected from illuminated surfaces coated in paint mixes, slurries of pigment particles, is not well approximated by a subtractive or additive mixing model. Color predictions that incorporate light scattering effects of pigment particles and paint layer thickness require approaches based on the Kubelka–Munk equations. Even such approaches cannot predict the color of paint mixtures precisely since small variances in particle size distribution, impurity concentrations etc. can be difficult to measure but impart perceptible effects on the way light is reflected from the paint. Artists typically rely on mixing experience and "recipes" to mix desired colors from a small initial set of primaries and do not use mathematical modelling.

There are hundreds of commercially available pigments for visual artists to use and mix (in various media such as oil, watercolor, acrylic, gouache, and pastel). A common approach is to use just a limited palette of primary pigments (often between four and eight) that can be physically mixed to any color that the artist desires in the final work. There is no specific set of pigments that are primary colors, the choice of pigments depends entirely on the artist's subjective preference of subject and style of art as well as material considerations like lightfastness and mixing heuristics. Contemporary classical realists have often advocated that a limited palette of white, red, yellow, and black pigment (often described as the "Zorn palette") is sufficient for compelling work.

A chromaticity diagram can illustrate the gamut of different choices of primaries, for example showing which colors are lost (and gained) if you use RGB for subtractive color mixing (instead of CMY).
