= OPSS =

OPSS may refer to:

- Office for Product Safety & Standards, part of the Department for Business, Energy and Industrial Strategy of the Government of the United Kingdom
- OPSS, the ICAO airport code for Saidu Sharif Airport, Pakistan
