= Arsenolite =

Toxic arsenic oxide mineral

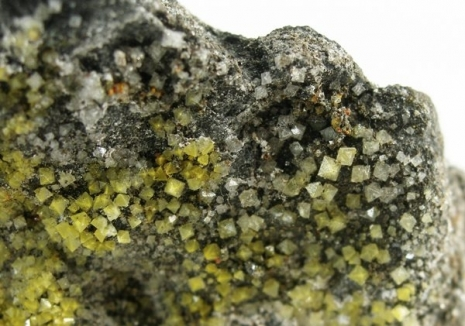
- Arsenolite from the White Caps Mine, Manhattan District, Nye County, Nevada (size: 6.0 x 4.3 x 2.9 cm)

General
- Category: Oxide mineral
- Formula: As_{2}O_{3}
- IMA symbol: Aso
- Strunz classification: 4.CB.50
- Crystal system: Cubic
- Crystal class: Hexoctahedral (m3̅m); H-M symbol: (4/m 3̅ 2/m)
- Space group: Fd3̅m
- Unit cell: a = 11.074 Å; Z = 16

Identification
- Formula mass: 197.841 g/mol
- Color: White, pale blue, pink to pale yellow if impure
- Crystal habit: Common as tiny octahedra; aggregates or crusts; botryoidal, stalactitic
- Cleavage: On {111}
- Fracture: Conchoidal
- Mohs scale hardness: 1.5
- Luster: Vitreous to silky; may be earthy or dull
- Streak: white /pale white
- Diaphaneity: Transparent
- Specific gravity: 3.87
- Optical properties: Isotropic; may be anomalously anisotropic
- Refractive index: n = 1.755
- Other characteristics: Astringent, sweetish taste; toxic

Arsenolite is an arsenic mineral, with chemical formula As_{2}O_{3}. It is formed as an oxidation product of arsenic sulfides. Commonly found as small octahedra, it is white, but impurities of realgar or orpiment may give it a pink or yellow hue. It can be associated with its dimorph claudetite (a monoclinic form of As_{2}O_{3}) as well as realgar (As_{4}S_{4}), orpiment (As_{2}S_{3}) and erythrite, Co_{3}(AsO_{4})_{2}·8H_{2}O.

Arsenolite belongs to the minerals which are highly toxic.

== Occurrence ==
It was first described in 1854 for an occurrence in the St Andreasberg District, Harz Mountains, Lower Saxony, Germany.

It occurs by the oxidation of arsenic-bearing sulfides in hydrothermal veins. It also occurs as a result of mine or coal seam fires.
