= Blende =

Blende may refer to:

== Substances ==
- Sphalerite (Zinc blende, ZnS), the most common usage
- Hornblende, a complex inosilicate series of minerals
- Pitchblende, former name of uraninite

== Places ==
- Blende, Colorado
- Blende mine, lead and zinc mines in Canada
- Blende River, watercourse in Canada

== Other uses ==
- an alternative name for Rana Niejta

== See also ==
- Blend (disambiguation)
- Ruby blende (disambiguation)
- Arsenic blende
