= Skaife =

Skaife is an English surname, a variant of the surname Scaife. Notable people with the surname include:

- Mark Skaife (born 1967), Australian motor racing driver
- Sydney Skaife (1889–1976), South African entomologist and naturalist
- Christopher Skaife (born 1965), Yeoman Warder and Ravenmaster, Tower of London
