= Arsenic (disambiguation) =

Arsenic is the chemical element with symbol As and atomic number 33.

Arsenic may also refer to:

- Arsenic trioxide, a poison commonly referred to as simply as "arsenic"
- Arsenic acid, a chemical compound with the formula H_{3}AsO_{4}
- Arsenic Lake, a lake in Ontario, Canada
- Ärsenik, a French rap group
- Mr. Arsenic, an America anthology television series
- Zoran Arsenić, a Croatian footballer

== See also ==
- Arsenic and Old Lace (disambiguation)
- As (disambiguation)
- Category:Arsenic compounds
- Isotopes of arsenic
- Arsenic blende
