= Bob Switzer =

American inventor, businessman and environmentalist

- Born: May 19, 1914; Fromberg, Montana
- Died: August 20, 1997 (aged 83); Shaker Heights, Ohio
- Occupations: Inventor, businessman, and environmentalist
- Known for: Co-inventor of the first black light fluorescent paint

Robert C. Switzer (19 May 1914 – 20 August 1997) was an American inventor, businessman and environmentalist. Switzer was co-inventor of the first black light fluorescent paint along with his brother Joseph Switzer and the inventor of the Magnaglo process for nondestructive flaw-detection in machined parts. The brothers founded the Day-Glo Color Corp. in 1946 to develop and manufacture fluorescent paints, pigments and other products.

== Biography ==
=== Early life ===
Switzer was born in Fromberg, Montana, to parents Maud (Slocum) and Emmet Switzer and was raised in Berkeley California. In 1932, he received a scholarship from the Scaife Scholarship Foundation of Oakland, California, so he attended the College of Chemistry at the University of California, Berkeley, in hopes of becoming a physician.

During the summer of 1933, while working to unload tomatoes from a freight car at a H. J. Heinz Company laboratory in Berkeley, California, Switzer fell and suffered several serious injuries, including a skull fracture and severed optic nerve. Medical doctors told him to stay in a dark room until he recovered his eyesight, a period which lasted several months.

=== Career ===
While convalescing from his injuries, Switzer and his brother Joseph searched for fluorescent materials, which Joseph had read about and wished to use in his amateur magic shows. The brothers inspected various products from their father's pharmacy, using a black light to identify fluorescent compounds. After Bob's recovery, the brothers continued to experiment with these, mixing them with shellac and eventually succeeding in producing the first black light fluorescent paints. They founded the Fluor-S-Art Co. in 1934 to develop and market their products for advertising displays.

The brothers moved their company to Cleveland, Ohio, to partner with Continental Lithograph, a subsidiary of Warner Brothers Pictures, that specialized in movie posters and advertisements. They developed and tested new applications for their fluorescent paints, including lithography, make-up, and fabric dyes.

In 1938, Switzer invented Zyglo and Magnaglo, two nondestructive testing processes that use fluorescent dyes to identify defects in machined parts. The dyes penetrate small defects and are seen when inspecting the parts under black light.

During World War II, the company developed daylight fluorescent pigments, which are highly visible in daylight. Bob produced the first piece of high-visibility clothing by dyeing his wife's wedding dress.

=== Personal life and legacy ===
Switzer married his wife Patricia (a Berkeley native) in 1936. The couple had three children. Switzer died in 1997 at his home in Shaker Heights, Ohio from complications from Parkinson's disease. He was 83 years old

When Day-Glo Color Corp. was sold to Nalco in 1985, Bob and his wife used the proceeds to establish the Robert and Patricia Switzer Foundation to fund students working on applied environmental problem solving.

In 2009, "The Day-Glo Brothers," a children's book about Bob and Joseph Switzer's invention of fluorescent materials, was published by author Chris Barton and illustrator Tony Persiani.
