= Scaife =

Origin
- Origin: Scandinavia
- Meaning: "boat-born", "awry, difficult"
- Region of origin: Old Norse

Scaife is a surname meaning "Boat born" in English. It is derived from Old Norse. Other references include "awry, difficult". The first recorded instance of this surname was in the Old English epic Beowulf. Notable people with the surname include:

- Adam Scaife (born 1970), British physicist and meteorologist
- Anna Scaife (born 1981), radio astronomer
- Brendan Scaife (born 1928), Irish engineer and physicist
- Bo Scaife (born 1981), American football player
- Bobby Scaife (born 1955), English football player
- Cordelia Scaife May (1928–2005), American philanthropist; sister of Richard
- J. G. Scaife (1934–1991) British molecular biologist
- John Scaife (1908–1995) Australian cricketer
- Michael Scaife (1948–2001), British biologist and psychologist
- Nicola Scaife, Australian balloonist
- Nicky Scaife (born 1975), English footballer
- Richard Mellon Scaife (1932–2014), American newspaper publisher
- Ross Scaife (1960–2008), American academic and scholar

Other uses:

- Scaife Foundations
- Scaife Mountains

== See also ==
- Scaif
- Skaife
