= Day-Glo Color Corp. =

American paint and pigments manufacturer (founded 1946)

Day-Glo Color Corp

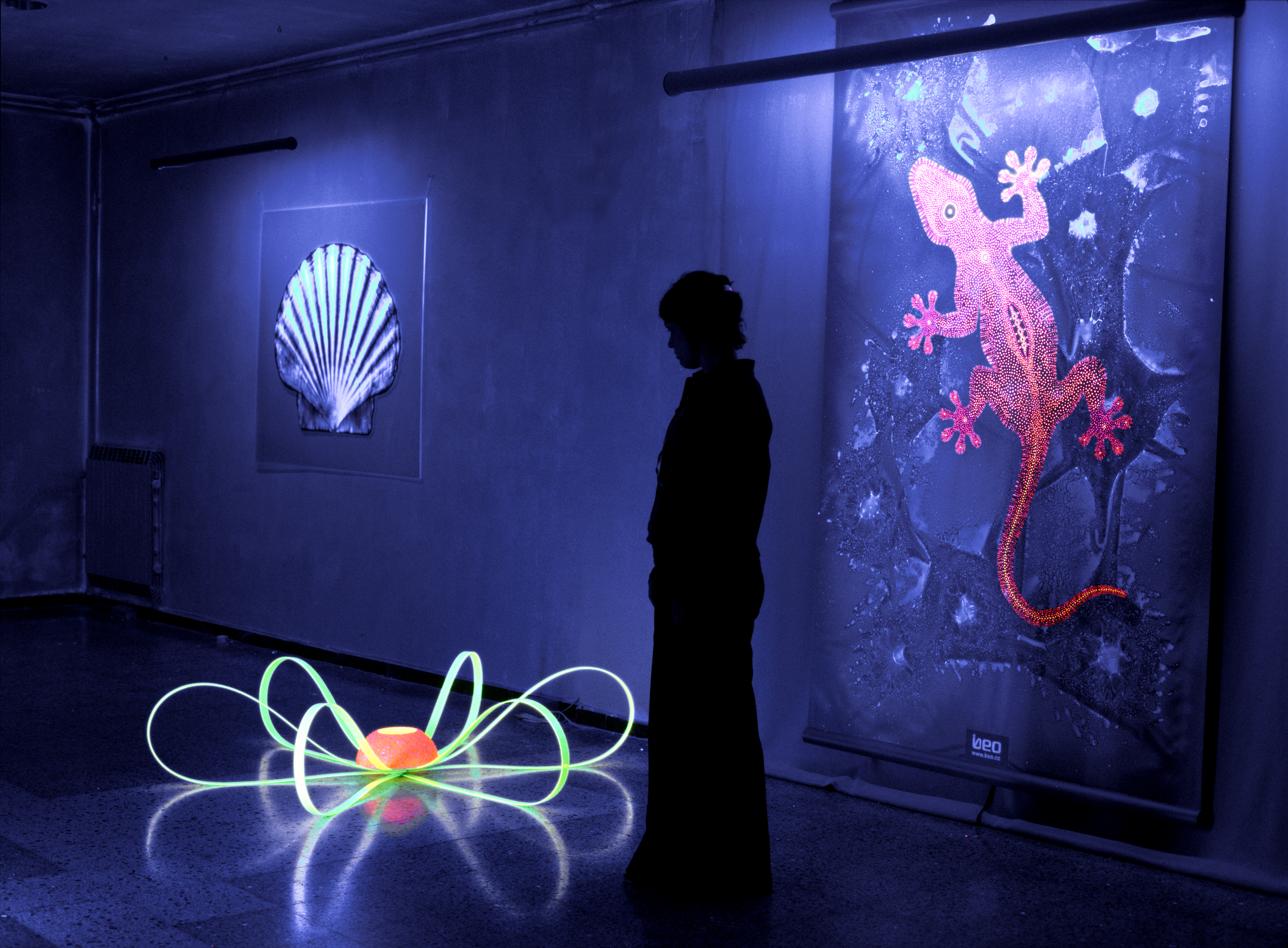
- Black light fluorescent paints were first developed by Fluor-S-Art Co. in the 1930s.
- Type: Private
- Industry: Paint and pigments production
- Predecessor: Switzer Brothers, Inc.
- Founded: 1946; 80 years ago in Berkeley, California, U.S.
- Founders: Robert and Joseph Switzer
- Headquarters: Cleveland, Ohio, U.S.
- Area served: Worldwide
- Key people: Frank 'Sully' Sullivan, President
- Products: Fluorescent paints
- Website: www.dayglo.com

The Day-Glo Color Corp. (also styled as DayGlo) is a privately held American paint and pigments manufacturer based in Cleveland, Ohio. It was founded in 1946 by brothers Joseph and Robert Switzer and is currently owned by RPM International. It specializes in fluorescent paint and pigments, such as those used in safety applications, artwork and signage. It invented black-light fluorescent and daylight fluorescent paints and nondestructive testing methods using fluorescent dyes.

== History ==
Robert and Joseph Switzer of Berkeley, California began investigating fluorescence in the 1930s using a black light to identify naturally occurring fluorescent compounds. By mixing these compounds with shellac, they invented the first black light fluorescent paints. Joseph used these paints in his amateur magic show and sold magic kits based on the black light fluorescent costumes they created.

The brothers established the Fluor-S-Art Co. in 1934 to develop and sell black light paints for advertising purposes. They later partnered with Continental Lithograph (a subsidiary of Warner Brothers Pictures) of Cleveland, Ohio, to develop fluorescent paints for movie posters and advertising displays. In 1936, they moved the company to Cleveland, a center of the paint industry.

In 1938, they invented Zyglo and Magnaglo, two flaw-detection processes using fluorescent dyes. The dyes are suspended in fluids which emphasize defects in parts (by penetrant action in the case of Zyglo and by the attraction of magnetic particles in the case of Magnaglo), both allowing the defects to be detected by inspecting the parts under black light. After a dispute with Continental Lithograph over the rights to Zyglo and Magnaglo, the brothers established the independent Switzer Brothers, Inc. in 1946 to continue developing and marketing new uses for fluorescent materials. The company changed its name to Day-Glo Color Corp. in 1969.

In the 1940s, the company began developing a new class of pigments that fluoresced in daylight by converting ultraviolet light to visible light, resulting in brighter colors than other types of pigments. These daylight fluorescing pigments are also known as DayGlo.

During World War II, DayGlo products were used extensively by the U.S. military where high visibility was required. U.S. ground troops in North Africa used daylight fluorescent fabric panels to identify themselves and prevent friendly fire bombings, and DayGlo paints were used on aircraft to prevent midair collisions. Navy aircraft carriers used DayGlo's black light fluorescent paints to allow planes to land at night, an advantage enemy pilots did not have. Military equipment manufacturers, particularly those of aircraft parts, employed DayGlo's Zyglo and Magnaglo processes to identify defects in fabricated metal parts.

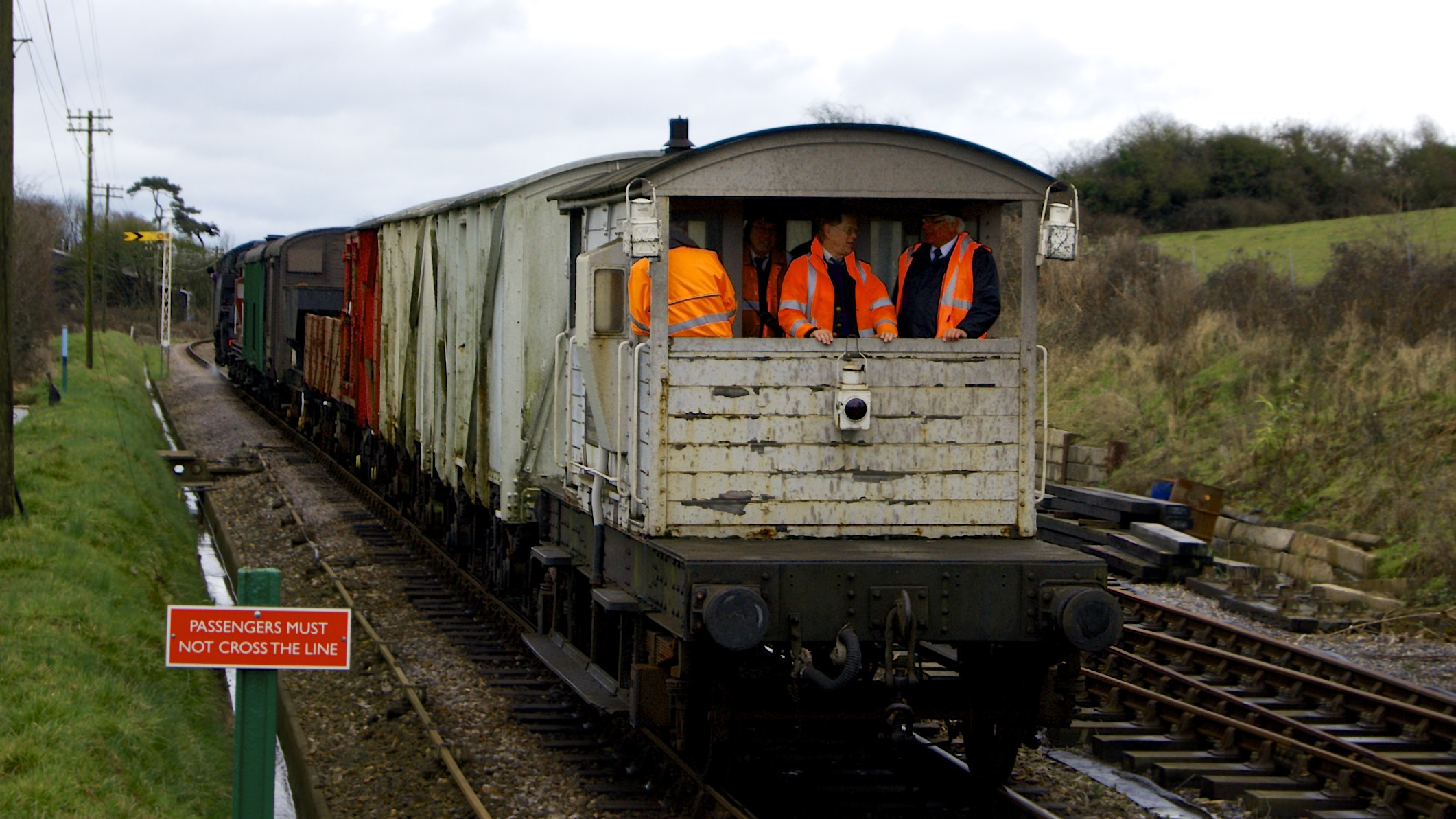
High-visibility vests use daylight fluorescent pigments.

After the war, advertisers used daylight fluorescent paints to make their products more visible to consumers. Tide detergent became known for its fluorescent packaging beginning in 1959, but other products such as clothing, posters and hula hoops also used fluorescent colors. Daylight fluorescent pigments were also used in safety products such as construction cones, street signs and safety vests due to their high visibility.

DayGlo pigments were popularized in the 1960s by their extensive use in psychedelic art, such as the album artwork for Cream's 1967 album Disraeli Gears. In February 1969, the company changed its name from Switzer Brothers, Inc. to DayGlo Color Corp.

In September 1985, the Nalco Chemical Company of Oak Brook purchased Day-Glo Color for approximately $40 million. They then sold it to RPM International in 1991 for an undisclosed price.

In 2012, Day-Glo Color Corp. was recognized as a National Historic Chemical Landmark for its development of daylight fluorescent pigments.

The company has manufacturing plants in Twinsburg, Ohio; Cudahy, California; and Houthalen, Belgium.

== Community involvement ==
For its annual DayGlo Show, Day-Glo donates its paint to artists in Northeast Ohio who use it to create original two- and three-dimensional art that is displayed in a gallery lighted with UV light (black light).
