= Arsenic blende =

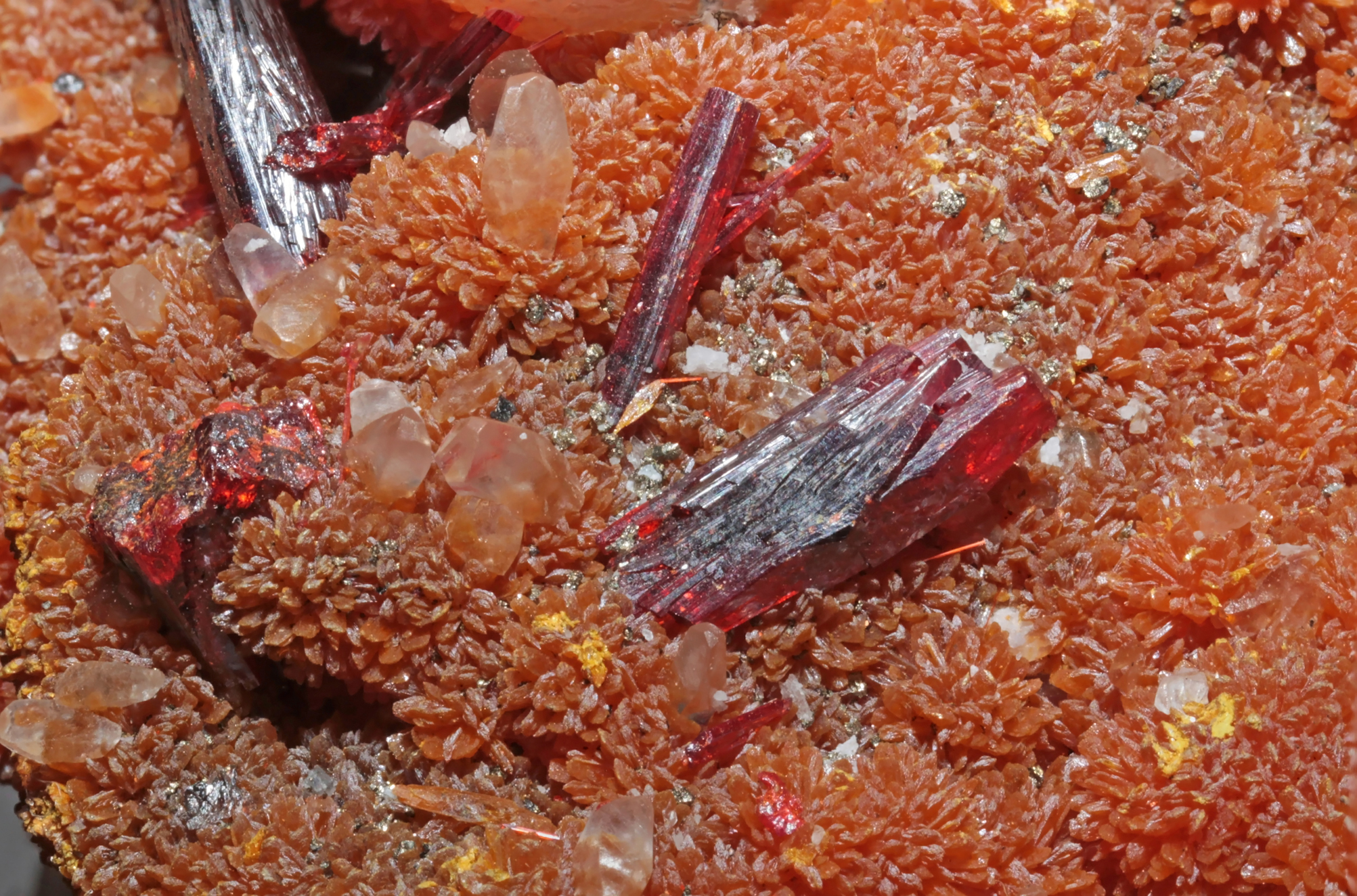
- Orpiment and realgar

General
- Category: Minerals

Arsenic blende or Arsenblende (German: Arsenblende, arsenik-blende) is a trivial name that has partially fallen out of scientific use, used by mineralogists, as well as representatives of mining and craft professions in relation to at least two similar ore minerals — orpiment and realgar, in composition — arsenic sulfides.

== History of the term ==
Both of these minerals, realgar and orpiment, have been mined for a very long time, for thousands of years. They were mined as natural pigments, as medicinal agents, and as preparations that were important in alchemical practice. Their use as pigments was very significant, both in pure form and in mixed form; for example orpiment was mixed with indigo or with lapis lazuli to make green paint for illumination both in medieval Europe and in the medieval Islamic world. Arsenic blende was used even more widely in medicine; for example, in Hebrew (orpiment) and ancient Greek medicine (realgar and orpiment). This use is entirely preserved in the folk medicine of some tribes in Asia (Japan, China), Caucasus and Europe (Russia). In China and Japan, realgar served as a raw material for jewelry crafts at the beginning of the 20th century, despite its toxicity.

Initially, the phrase ″arsenic blende″ was mostly used to refer to orpiment. This name was given to a natural mineral with a high arsenic content, as well as a bright golden or lemon-yellow paint based on it. This pigment was highly valued for its color and was called "royal yellow"; it was widely used in fresco painting and icon painting, despite its strong toxicity and chemical instability.

The purity and brightness of color, rare for nature, combined with the diamond lustre of the mineral, often deceived ignorant people. From a distance, the orpiment could in fact be mistaken for native gold, not distinguished by such brilliance. In addition, well-formed realgar crystals look impressive and often give the impression of red gemstones: rubies or garnets. For this, realgar also earned two other trivial names: ″ruby sulphur″ and ″ruby of arsenic″.

In the scientific literature, until the first half of the 19th century, both of these minerals were more often called "arsenic blende" (red or yellow). As minerals that are old, bright and widespread, realgar (″sandarac″) and orpiment are very often cited as the most famous examples of the group of blendes.

Until the second half of the 19th century, ″arsenic blende″ remained a conventionally accepted scientific mineralogical term. Used in its pure form, without additional definition, as a rule, it meant orpiment or, more generally, arsenic sulfide in the form of a mineral. However, more often in the texts there was still a color clarification that made it possible to avoid confusion: red arsenic blende was called realgar, and yellow arsenic blende was called orpiment. However, such a distinction often seems more than arbitrary, since realgar and orpiment are very often found together in close fusions or associations. In addition, realgar as a mineral is unstable, it gradually oxidizes in the light, and often directly turns into orpiment, as a result of which the red color gradually fades and turns into orange or yellow.

In the 20th century, there was an almost complete displacement of arsenic blende as a term from the scientific glossary — into the colloquial language of geologists, miners, engineers, metallurgists, mineral collectors and other categories of amateurs. Nevertheless, the phrase has remained alive and relevant to this day in the study of the history of mineralogy, and also as one of the striking examples of minerals included in the group of blendes.

== Essential minerals ==
- Arsenic blende, orpiment, also yellow arsenic blende — arsenic sulfide, ore mineral of the composition As_{2}S_{3}. It has a bright color from lemon yellow to golden orange.
- Arsenic blende, realgar, also red arsenic blende or sandarac — arsenic sulfide, ore mineral with the composition AsS. It also has a bright color ranging from fiery red to orange-yellow.

In addition, another widely known ore mineral, which in its chemical composition belongs to a different group, has a similar trivial name:

- Arsenical silver blende or arsenic-silver blende, proustite — silver thioarsenide, an ore mineral with the composition Ag_{3}AsS_{3}, forms dark purplish-red crystals with a lead-gray tint.

== Gallery ==
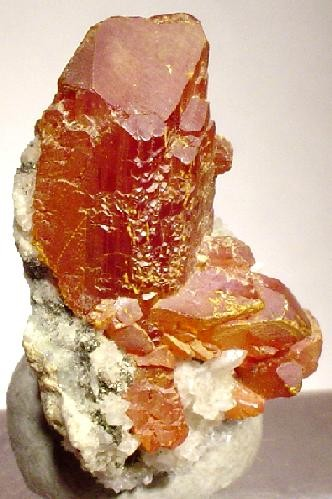
Orpiment

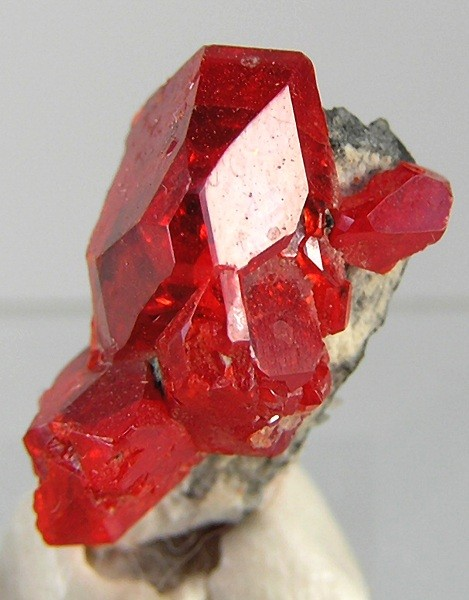
Realgar

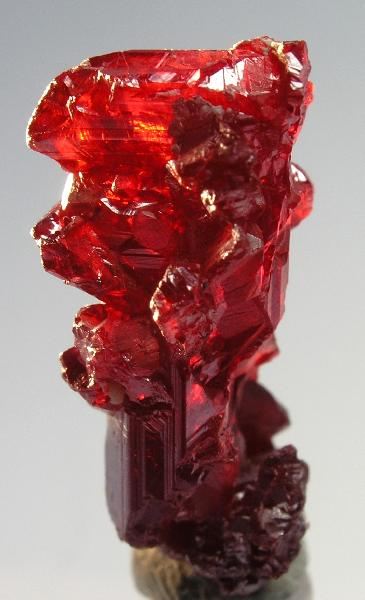
Proustite

== See also ==
- Blende (disambiguation)
- Arsenic (disambiguation)
