= Blacklight paint =

Luminous paint that glows

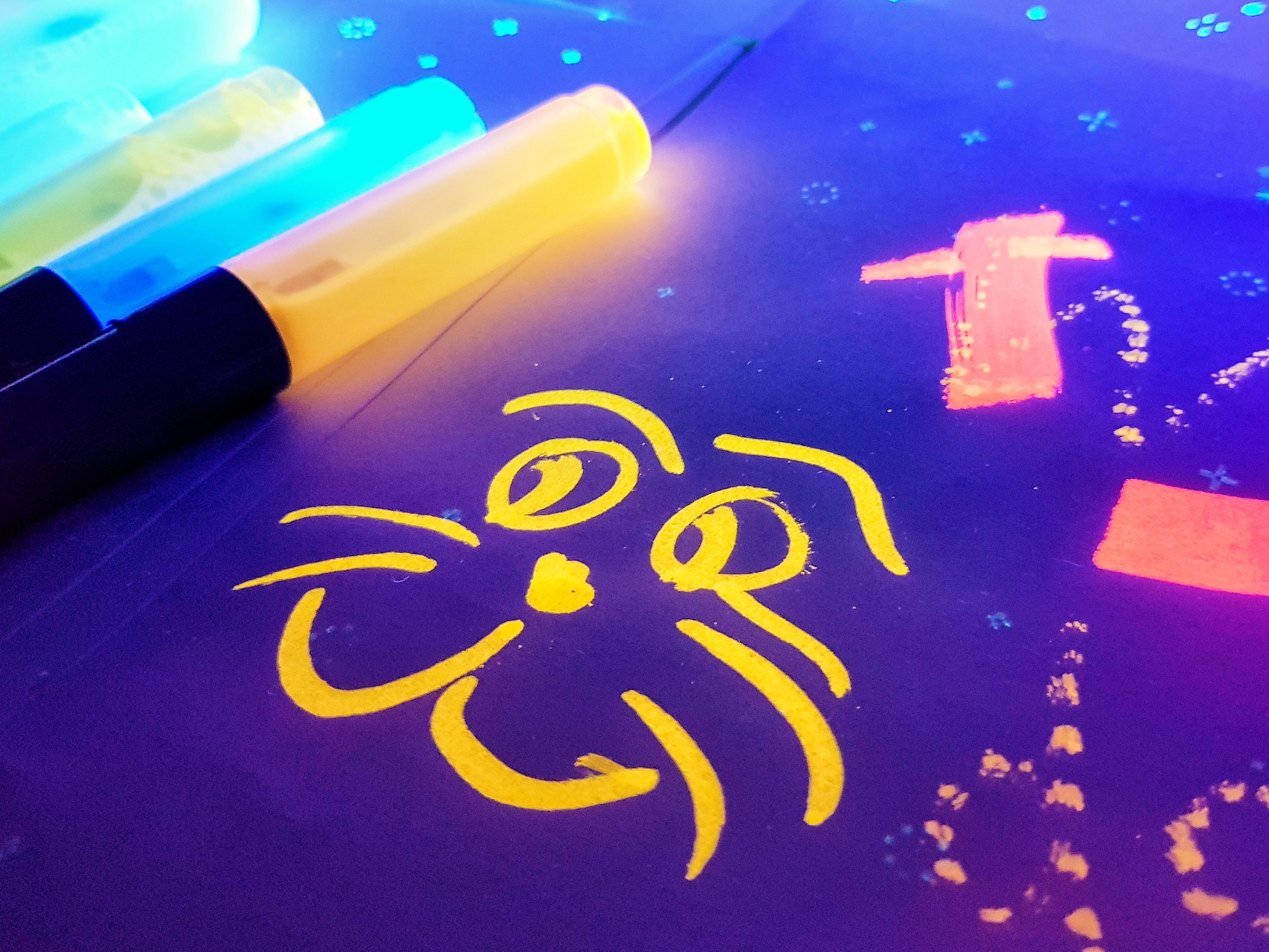
Luminous ink under ultraviolet light

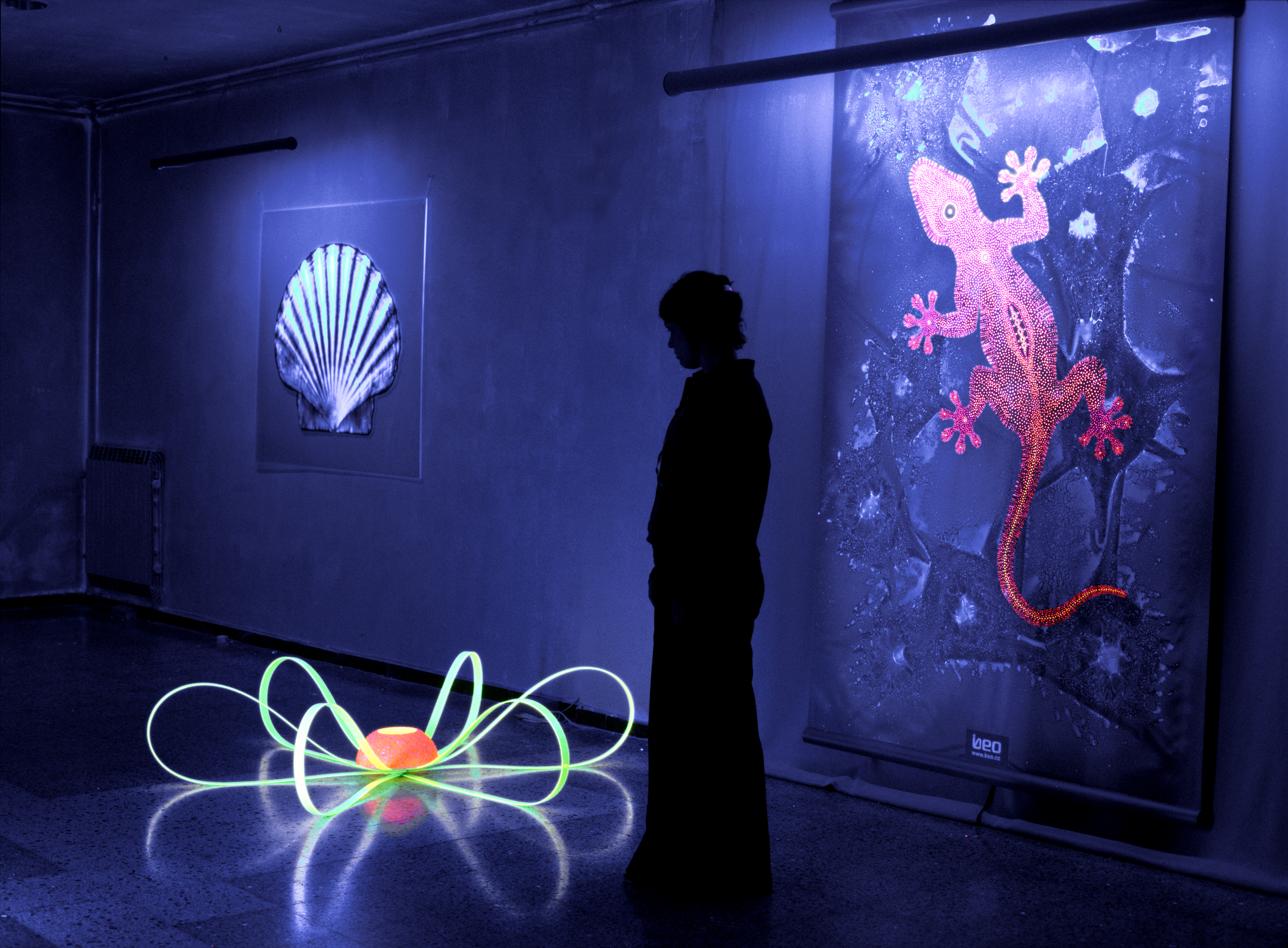
Fluorescent paintings lit by black light

Black light paint or black light fluorescent paint is luminous paint that glows under a black light. It is based on pigments that respond to light in the ultraviolet segment of the electromagnetic spectrum. The paint may or may not be colorful under ordinary light. Black light paint should not be confused with phosphorescent (glow-in-the-dark) or daylight fluorescent paint.

== History ==
The invention of black light paint is attributed to brothers Joseph and Robert Switzer in the 1930s. After a fall, Robert suffered a severe head injury that resulted in a severed optic nerve. His doctor confined him to a dark room while he waited for his sight to recover. Joseph, who was a chemistry major at the University of California, Berkeley, worked with Robert to investigate fluorescent compounds. They brought a black light into the storeroom of their father's drugstore looking for naturally fluorescing organic compounds and mixed those compounds with shellac to develop the first black light fluorescent paints. The first use of these paints was for Joseph's amateur magic shows.

The brothers founded the Fluor-S-Art Company, later named Day-Glo Color Corp., to develop and sell their products. Day-Glo is a registered trademark of the Day-Glo Color Corporation. The first commercial uses of black light fluorescent paints were for store displays and movie theaters. During World War II, black light fluorescent paints were used on U.S. naval carriers to allow planes to land at night.

== Characteristics and uses ==
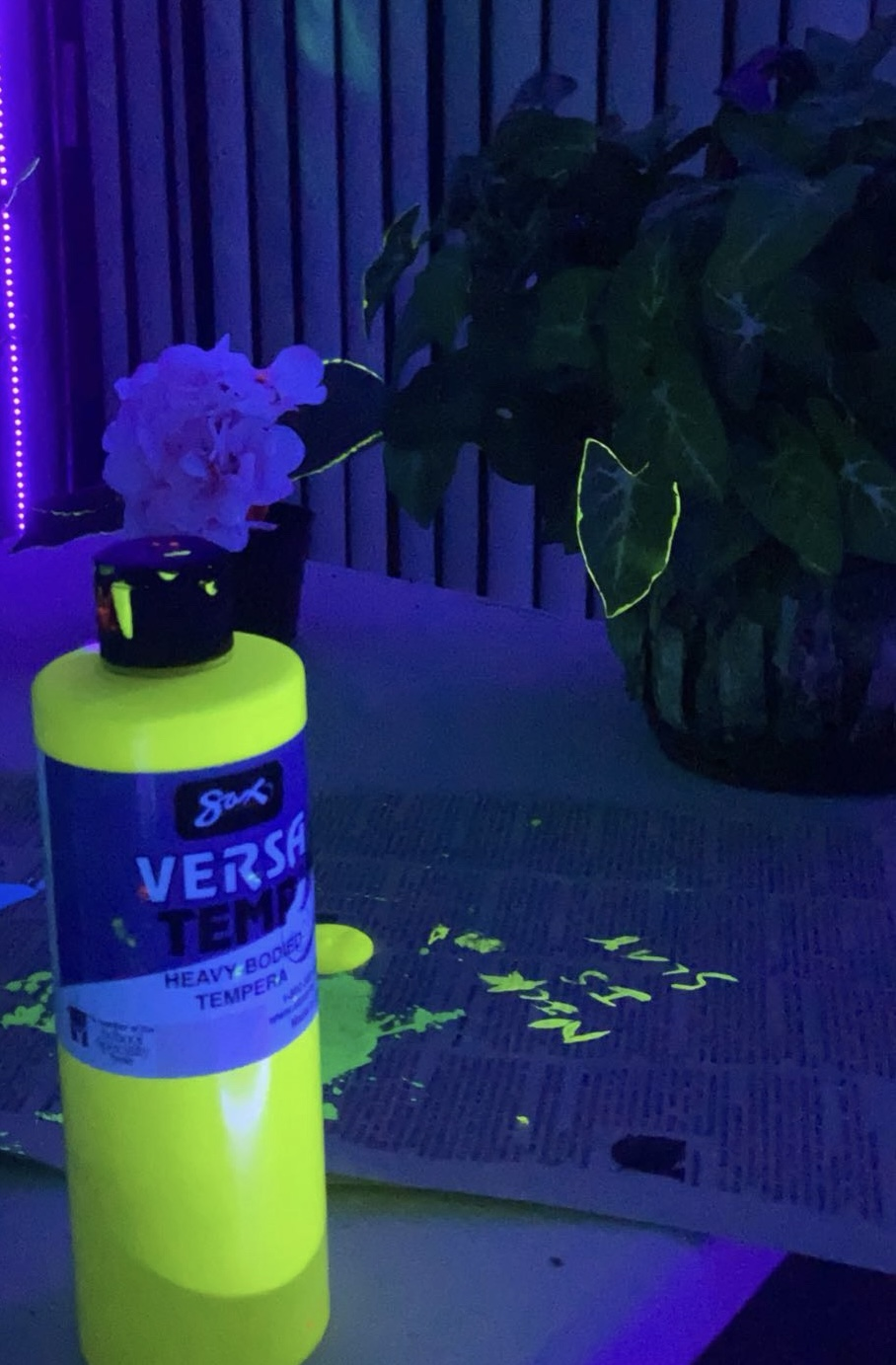
Blacklight painting project with artificial plant

Black light paints and inks are commonly used in the production of black light posters. Under daylight, the poster may or may not be vibrant in color, but under black light (with little or no visible light present), the effect produced can be psychedelic. The inks are normally highly sensitive to direct sunlight and other powerful light sources. The fluorescent dyes cause a chemical reaction when exposed to high intensity light sources (HILS) and the visual result is a fading in the colors of the inks. With paper, significant visible change in the color saturation can typically be observed within 45 minutes to one hour of exposure to the HILS. To date, there is no absolute method to prevent this phenomenon, although certain laminations, lacquer coatings and glass or plastic protective sheets can effectively slow the fading characteristics of the dyes.

Other common usage of the black light pigments is in security features of money notes, various certificates printed on paper, meal coupons, tickets and similar things that represent a value (monetary or otherwise). The black light printed figures used for this purpose are usually invisible under normal lighting, even when they are exposed to direct sunlight (which contains ultraviolet light) but they show up glowing when exposed to black light source. This defeats simple and inexpensive attempts to counterfeit them by scanning the original using a high resolution scanner and printing them using an inexpensive high resolution printer (most if not all inexpensive printers do not allow using black light inks for printing) and no special equipment is needed to verify the presence and correctness of this feature (an inexpensive black light source being all that is required). Some coupons and tickets use colorful black light inks.

On many German locomotives the control panel labels were printed with black light paint and a black light source was provided in the cab. This left the driver with full night vision while still enabling him to distinguish between the different switches and levers to operate his locomotive.

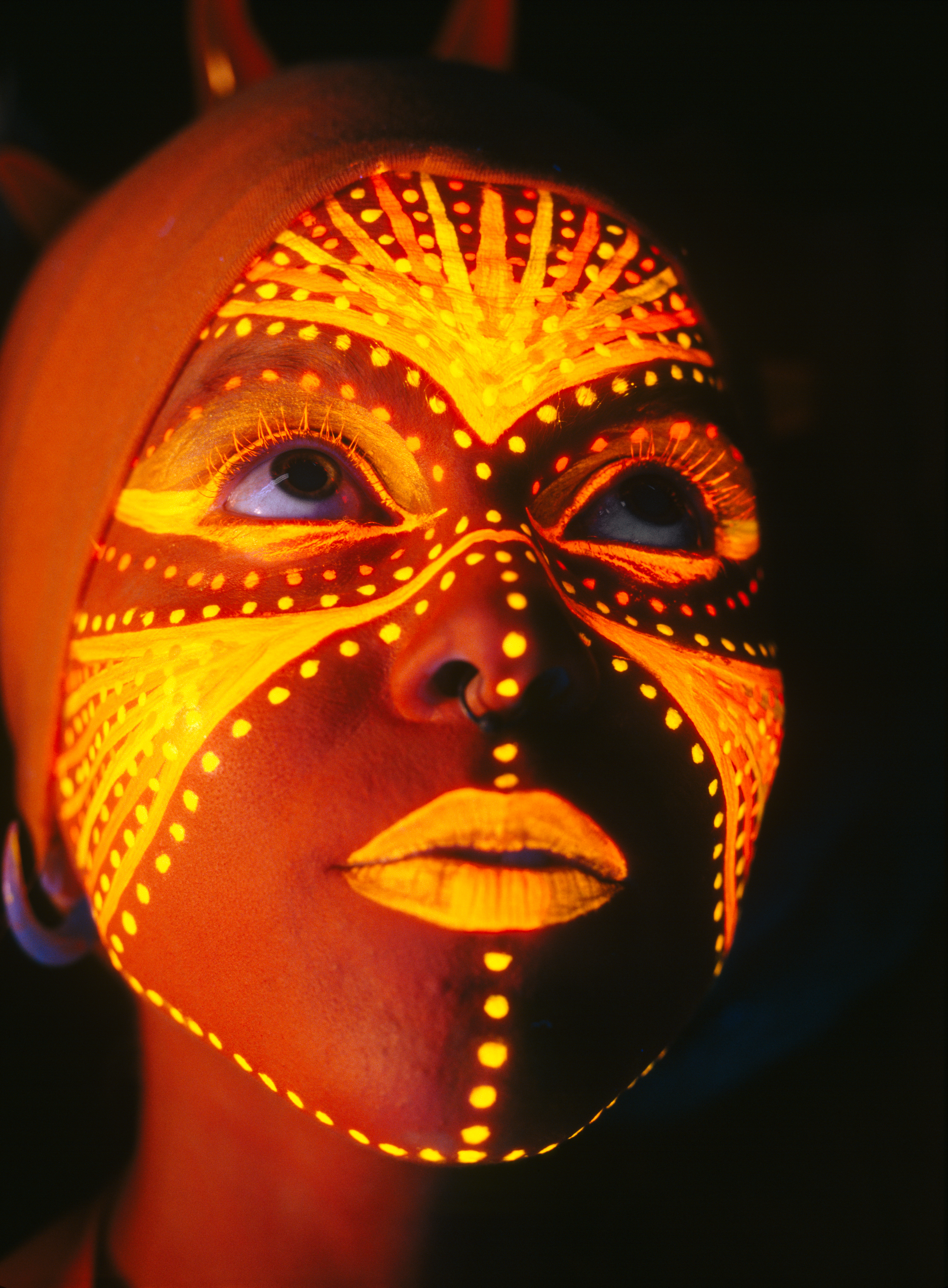
Bodypainting with fluorescent paint

Black light paints are sometimes used in the scenery of amusement park dark rides: a black light illuminates the vivid colors of the scenery, while the vehicle and other passengers remain dimly lit or barely visible. This can enhance the effect of being in a fantasy world.

Black light paints may be fluorescent or, more rarely, phosphorescent, containing a phosphor that continues to glow for a time after the black light has been removed. Black light paint can be mixed with similar shades of normal pigments, ‘brightening’ them when viewed in sunlight.
