= Blende mine =

Mine in Yukon, Canada

- Location: Yukon, Canada
- Products: Lead, Zinc

The Blende mine is one of the largest lead and zinc mines in Canada. The mine is located in north-western Canada in Yukon. The mine has reserves amounting to 19.6 million tonnes of ore grading 2.81% lead, 3.04% zinc, 1.72 million oz of gold and 35.1 million oz of silver.
