= The Blending (novel series) =

- Convergence: Book One of The Blending, Competitions: Book Two of The Blending, Challenges: Book Three of The Blending, Betrayals: Book Four of The Blending, Prophecy: Book Five of The Blending, Intrigues: Book One of The Blending Enthroned, Deceptions: Book Two of The Blending Enthroned, Destiny: Book Three of The Blending Enthroned
- Author: Sharon Green
- Cover artist: Thomas Canty
- Country: United States
- Language: English
- Genre: Fantasy novel
- Publisher: Eos

The Blending is a fantasy series by Sharon Green. There are five novels in The Blending series, and an additional three novels in The Blending Enthroned. The covers for all the books were illustrated by Thomas Canty.

- Convergence: Book One of The Blending, Avon, November 1996
- Competitions: Book Two of The Blending, Avon, March 1997
- Challenges: Book Three of The Blending, Avon, May 1998
- Betrayals: Book Four of The Blending, Avon, February 1999
- Prophecy: Book Five of The Blending, Avon, July 1999
- Intrigues: Book One of The Blending Enthroned, Eos, October 3, 2000
- Deceptions: Book Two of The Blending Enthroned
- Destiny: Book Three of The Blending Enthroned, Eos, April 2, 2002

== Overview ==
Every twenty-five years, those with magical talents, called adepts, compete for a position within The Blending, a group of five adepts who rule the land. Tamrissa (the Fire adept), Lorand (the Earth adept), Jovvi (Spirit), Clarion (the Air), and Vallant (the Water) combine into The Blending, but another group of adepts attempt to usurp the position for themselves.
