= J. G. Scaife =

John Graham Scaife FRSE (23 September 1934–5 June 1991) was a 20th-century British pioneer of molecular parasitology.

== Life ==
Scaife was born in Leeds on 23 September 1934. He was educated at Leeds Modern School, where he performed in plays with Alan Bennett.

In the 1950s he did National Service with the Royal Navy Volunteer Reserve. Attending the University of London he graduated BSc in 1959. He then attended the Postgraduate Medical School in London, specialising in bacterial genetics and gaining a doctorate (PhD) in 1964. He then spent four years at Harvard Medical School in the Department of Medical Microbiology.

Scaife returned to Britain in 1968 first (briefly) to the MRC Molecular Genetics Unit in London, then to the University of Edinburgh in autumn of 1968 as a lecturer under William Hayes. He became a senior lecturer in molecular biology in 1974 and reader in 1978. He started in the new field of molecular parasitology in 1979. He was created Professor of Molecular Biology in 1984. In 1991 he was elected a Fellow of the Royal Society of Edinburgh. His proposers were E. C. R. Reeve, G. H. Beale, A. E. H. Emery, John O. Bishop, Douglas Scott Falconer and Aubrey Manning.

Scaife died in Edinburgh on 5 June 1991.
