= Blender =

Blender may refer to:

== Music ==
- Blender (band), a Swedish dansband
- The Blenders, an American vocal quartet
- Blender (Collective Soul album), 2000
- Blender (The Murmurs album), 1998
- ’’Blender” a song by 5 Seconds Of Summer from 5SOS5, 2022
- "Blender", a song by Moka Only from the album Sex Money Moka, 2014
- "Blender" a song by Yello from the album Baby, 1995

== People ==
- Everton Blender (born 1954) Everton Dennis Williams, Jamaican reggae singer and producer
- Jr Blender, German producer and songwriter
- Neil Blender (born 1963), American skateboarder, skate company owner, and artist

== Other uses ==
- Blender, Germany, a municipality in Lower Saxony, Germany
- Blender (appliance), a kitchen appliance for chopping, mixing or liquefying food
- Blender (mountain), Bavaria, Germany
- Blender (magazine), an American music magazine 1994–2009
- Blender (software), a free and open-source software program for 3D modeling, animation, and rendering
  - The Blender Foundation, a nonprofit organization responsible for the development of Blender
- Blender, a character from the fourth season of Battle for Dream Island, an animated web series

== See also ==
- Bender (disambiguation)
- Blendr, a geosocial networking application
