= Realgar =

Arsenic sulfide mineral

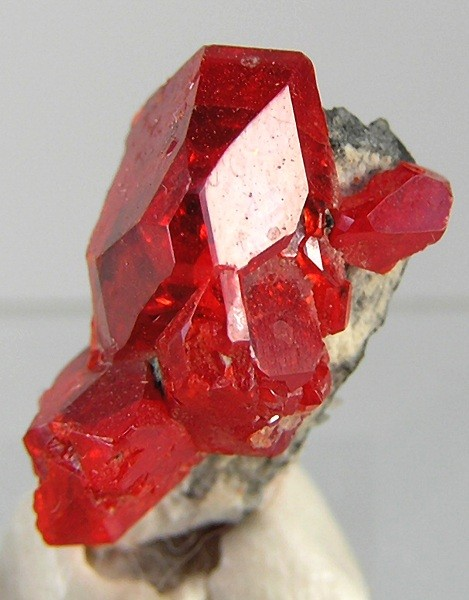
- Realgar crystals, Royal Reward Mine, King County, Washington, US

General
- Category: Sulfide mineral
- Formula: As_{4}S_{4} or AsS
- IMA symbol: Rlg
- Strunz classification: 2.FA.15a
- Crystal system: Monoclinic
- Crystal class: Prismatic (2/m) (same H-M symbol)
- Space group: P2_{1}/n (no. 14)
- Unit cell: a = 9.325(3) Å b = 13.571(5) Å c = 6.587(3) Å β = 106.43°; Z = 16

Identification
- Color: Red to yellow-orange; in polished section, pale gray, with abundant yellow to red internal reflections
- Crystal habit: Prismatic striated crystals; more commonly massive, coarse to fine granular, or as incrustations
- Twinning: Contact twins on {100}
- Cleavage: Good on {010}; less so on {101}, {100}, {120}, and {110}
- Tenacity: Sectile, slightly brittle
- Mohs scale hardness: 1.5–2
- Luster: Resinous to greasy
- Streak: Red-orange to red
- Diaphaneity: Transparent
- Specific gravity: 3.56
- Optical properties: Biaxial (−)
- Refractive index: n_{α} = 2.538 n_{β} = 2.684 n_{γ} = 2.704
- Birefringence: δ = 0.166
- Pleochroism: Nearly colorless to pale golden yellow
- 2V angle: 40°
- Dispersion: r > v, very strong
- Other characteristics: Toxic and carcinogenic. Disintegrates on long exposure to light to a powder composed of pararealgar or arsenolite and orpiment.

Realgar (/riˈælɡɑːr, -ɡər/ ree-AL-gar, -gər), also known as arsenic blende, ruby sulphur or ruby of arsenic, is an arsenic sulfide mineral with the chemical formula α-As_{4}S_{4}. It is a soft mineral occurring in monoclinic crystals, or in granular, compact, or powdery form, often in association with the related mineral, orpiment (As_{2}S_{3}). It is orange-red in color, and burns with a bluish flame releasing fumes of arsenic and sulfur. It is trimorphous with pararealgar and bonazziite.

== Etymology ==
Its name comes from the Arabic rahj al-ġār (رهج الغار [rahdʒælɣaːr], "powder of the mine"), via Medieval Latin, and its earliest record in English is in the 1390s.

== Uses ==
Realgar is a minor ore of arsenic extracted in China, Peru, and the Philippines.

=== Historical uses ===
Realgar was used by firework manufacturers in white flame and star compositions and to produce yellow smoke in daytime fireworks.

Realgar has been used to kill weeds, insects, and rodents, even though more effective arsenic-based anti-pest agents are available such as cacodylic acid, (CH_{3})_{2}As(O)OH, an organoarsenic compound used as an herbicide.

Realgar was also used by Ancient Greek apothecaries to make a medicine known as "bull's blood". The Greek physician Nicander described a death by "bull's blood", which matches the known effects of arsenic poisoning. Bull's blood is the poison that is said to have been used by Themistocles and Midas for suicide.

The Chinese name for realgar is 雄黃 (Mandarin xiónghuáng), literally 'masculine yellow', as opposed to orpiment which is 'feminine yellow'.

Realgar was, along with orpiment, traded in the Roman Empire and was used as a red paint pigment. Early occurrences of realgar as a red paint pigment are known for works of art from China, India, Central Asia, and Egypt. It was used in Venetian fine-art painting during the Renaissance era, though rarely elsewhere in Europe, a use which died out by the 18th century. It was also used as medicine. Other traditional uses include manufacturing lead shot, printing, and dyeing calico cloth. It was used to poison rats in medieval Spain and in 16th century England.

== Occurrence ==
Realgar most commonly occurs as a low-temperature hydrothermal vein mineral associated with other arsenic and antimony minerals. It also occurs as volcanic sublimations and in hot spring deposits. It occurs in association with orpiment, arsenolite, calcite and barite.

It is found with lead, silver and gold ores in Hungary, Bohemia and Saxony. In the US it occurs notably in Mercur, Utah; Manhattan, Nevada; and in the geyser deposits of Yellowstone National Park.

After a long period of exposure to light, realgar changes form to a yellow powder known as pararealgar (β-As_{4}S_{4}). It was once thought that this powder was the yellow sulfide (orpiment), but is a distinct chemical compound.

== Gallery ==
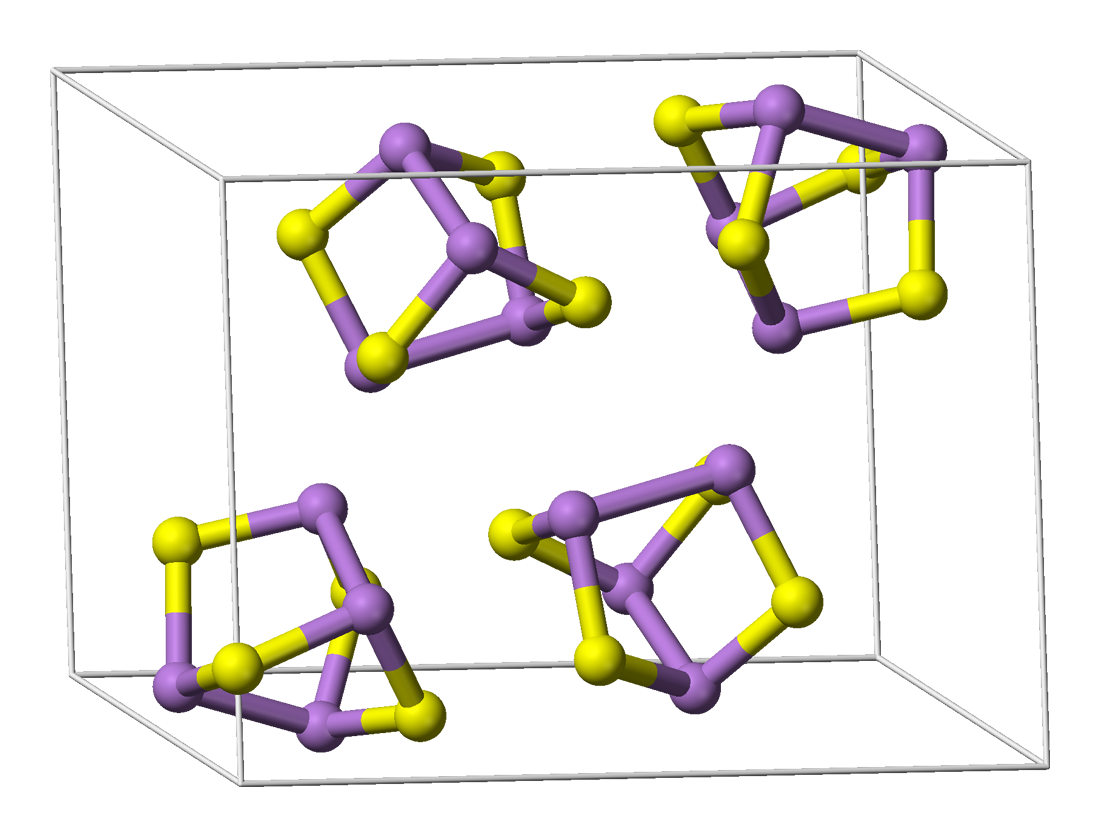
The unit cell of realgar, showing clearly the As_{4}S_{4} molecules it contains

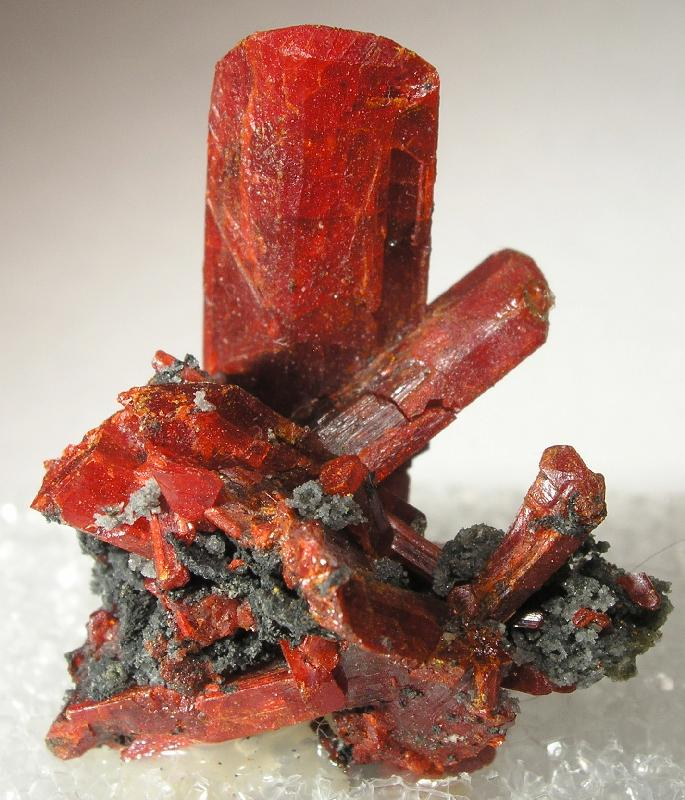
Cluster of realgar crystals from Getchell Mine, Adam Peak, Potosi District, Humboldt County, Nevada, United States

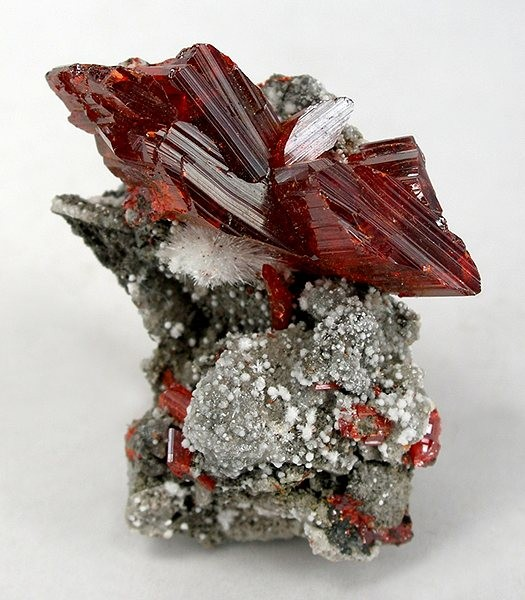
Cherry-red realgar crystals atop a matrix, and a sharp acicular spray of the rare species picropharmacolite (white needles) below

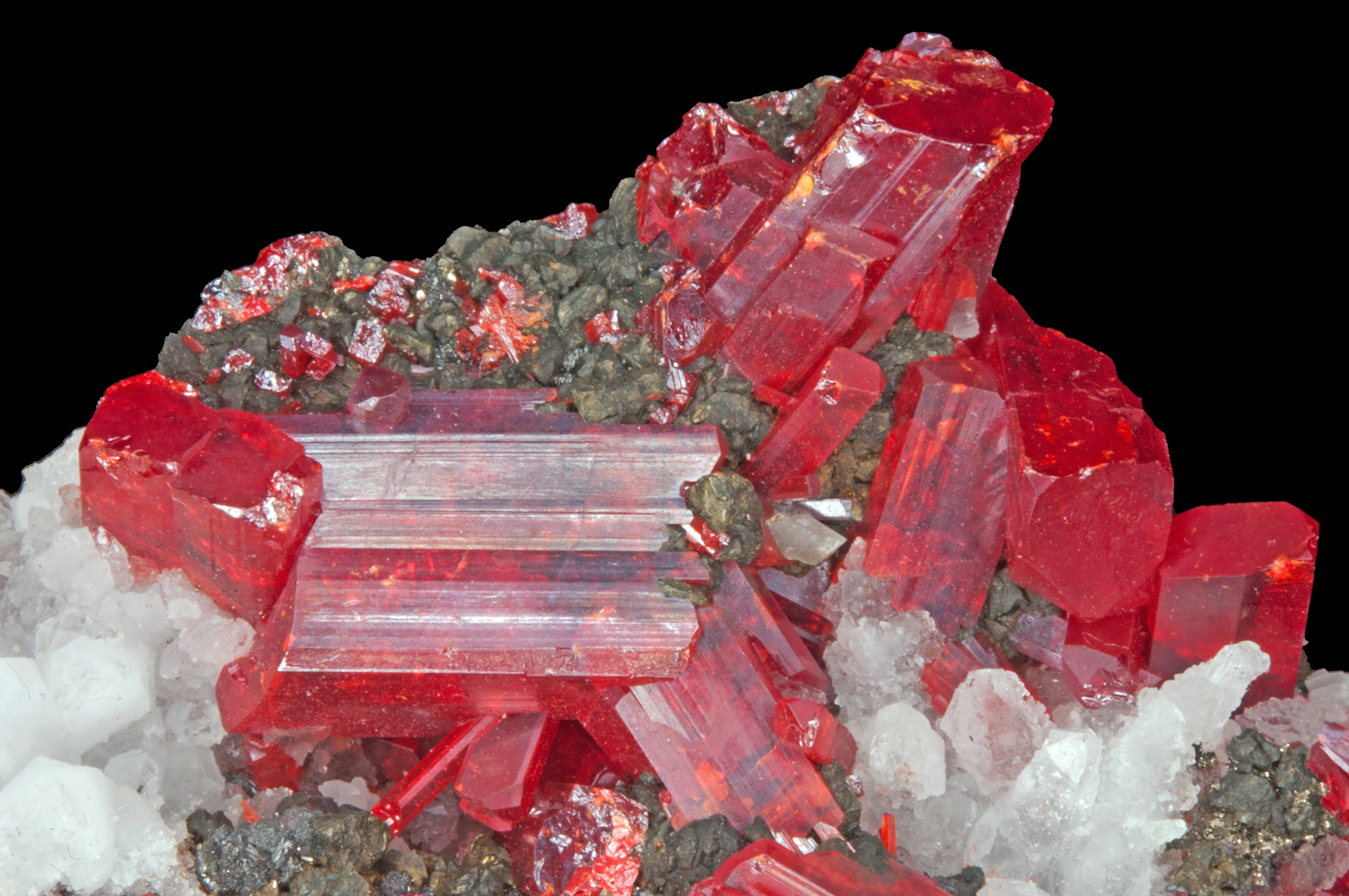
Crystals of realgar, quartz, chalcopyrite and galena, from Quiruvilca Mine, La Libertad, Peru

== See also ==
- Classification of minerals
- List of inorganic pigments
- List of minerals
- Realgar wine or Xionghuang wine is a Chinese alcoholic drink that is made from Chinese liquor dosed with powdered realgar.
