= Office for Product Safety and Standards =

British government department

The Office for Product Safety and Standards is a British government department that is responsible for the safety of consumer products, and the regulation of measurement standards. It is part of the Department for Business and Trade of the Government of the United Kingdom. It was previously part of the Department for Business, Energy and Industrial Strategy until that department's dissolution in February 2023.

== Role ==
The OPSS was created in January 2018 from the Regulatory Delivery directorate of the Department for Business, Energy and Industrial Strategy.

OPSS is the regulator for all consumer products in the United Kingdom, except for vehicles (regulated by the Driver and Vehicle Standards Agency), medicines (the Medicines and Healthcare products Regulatory Agency) and food (the Food Standards Agency). It leads on government policy on product safety matters and is also the national regulator for legal metrology, ensuring weighing and measuring instruments are accurate and reliable.

The Office was established with a plan to develop its capability over time. It became part of the Department for Business and Trade in 2023, but a longer-term proposal is to establish it as an arm's length independent body.

== See also ==
- Standards Department
- National Measurement and Regulation Office
- U.S. Consumer Product Safety Commission
