= Orpiment =

Orange-yellow arsenic sulfide mineral

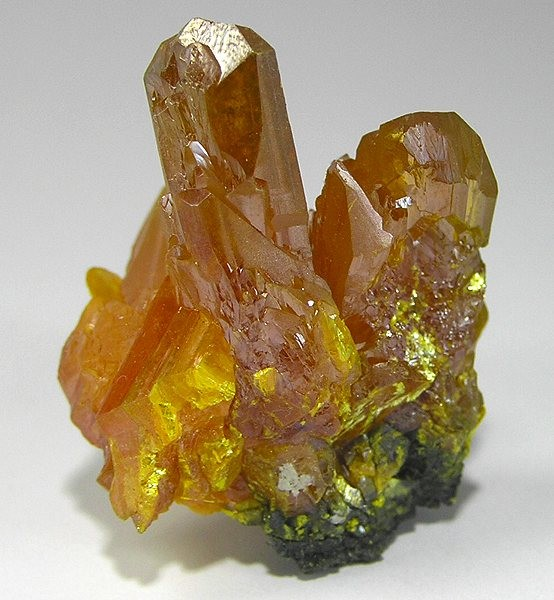
- Orpiment crystal from Twin Creeks Mine, Potosi District, Humboldt County, Nevada, United States (Size: 3.3 cm × 2.1 cm × 2.1 cm)

General
- Category: Sulfide mineral
- Formula: As_{2}S_{3}
- IMA symbol: Orp
- Strunz classification: 2.FA.30
- Crystal system: Monoclinic
- Crystal class: Prismatic (2/m) (same H-M symbol)
- Space group: P2_{1}/n
- Unit cell: a = 11.475(5), b = 9.577(4) c = 4.256(2) [Å], β = 90.45(5)°; Z = 4

Identification
- Color: Lemon-yellow to golden or brownish yellow
- Crystal habit: Commonly in foliated columnar or fibrous aggregates; may be reniform or botryoidal; also granular or powdery; rarely as prismatic crystals
- Twinning: On {100}
- Cleavage: Perfect on {010}, imperfect on {100};
- Tenacity: Sectile
- Mohs scale hardness: 1.5–2
- Luster: Resinous, pearly on cleavage surface
- Streak: Pale lemon-yellow
- Diaphaneity: Transparent
- Specific gravity: 3.49
- Optical properties: Biaxial (−)
- Refractive index: n_{α} = 2.400 n_{β} = 2.810 n_{γ} = 3.020
- Birefringence: δ = 0.620
- Pleochroism: In reflected light, strong, white to pale gray with reddish tint; in transmitted light, Y = yellow, Z = greenish yellow
- 2V angle: Measured: 30° to 76°, Calculated: 62°
- Dispersion: r > v, strong

Orpiment, also known as yellow arsenic blende, is a deep-colored, orange-yellow arsenic sulfide mineral with formula As_{2}S_{3}. It is found in volcanic fumaroles, low-temperature hydrothermal veins, and hot springs and may be formed through sublimation.

Orpiment takes its name from the Latin auripigmentum (aurum, "gold" + pigmentum, "pigment"), due to its deep-yellow color. Orpiment once was widely used in artworks, medicine, and other applications. Because of its toxicity and instability, its usage has declined.

== Etymology ==
The Latin auripigmentum (aurum, "gold" + pigmentum, "pigment") referred both to its deep-yellow color and to the historical belief that it contained gold. The Latin term was used by Pliny in the first century CE.

The Greek for orpiment was arsenikon, deriving from the Greek word arsenikos, meaning "male", from the belief that metals were of different sexes. This Greek term was used by Theophrastus in the fourth century BC.

The Sanskrit name for orpiment is haritāla (हरिताल), derived from harita (हरित), meaning "yellowish" or "greenish". Another Sanskrit name is kanakarasa (कनकरस), meaning "liquid gold".

The Chinese term for orpiment is Ci-Huang (in Pinyin), meaning "female yellow".

The Persian for orpiment is zarnikh, deriving from the word "zar", the Persian for gold.

== Physical and optical properties ==
Orpiment is a common monoclinic arsenic sulfide mineral. It has a Mohs hardness of 1.5 to 2 and a specific gravity of 3.49. It melts at 300 °C (570 °F) to 325 °C (620 °F). Optically, it is biaxial (−) with refractive indices of a = 2.4, b = 2.81, g = 3.02.

== Visual characteristics ==
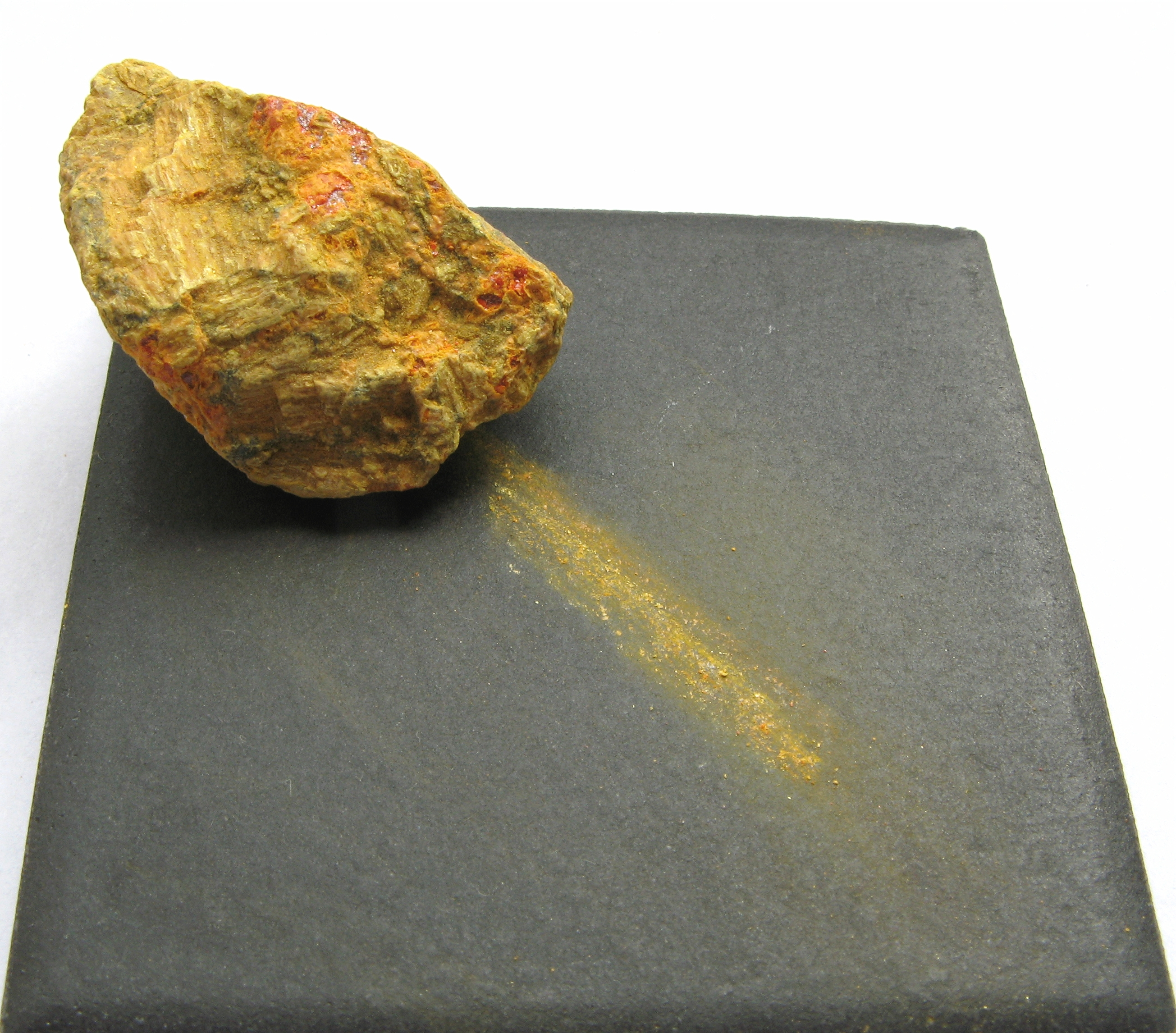
Bright golden-yellow streak color of orpiment

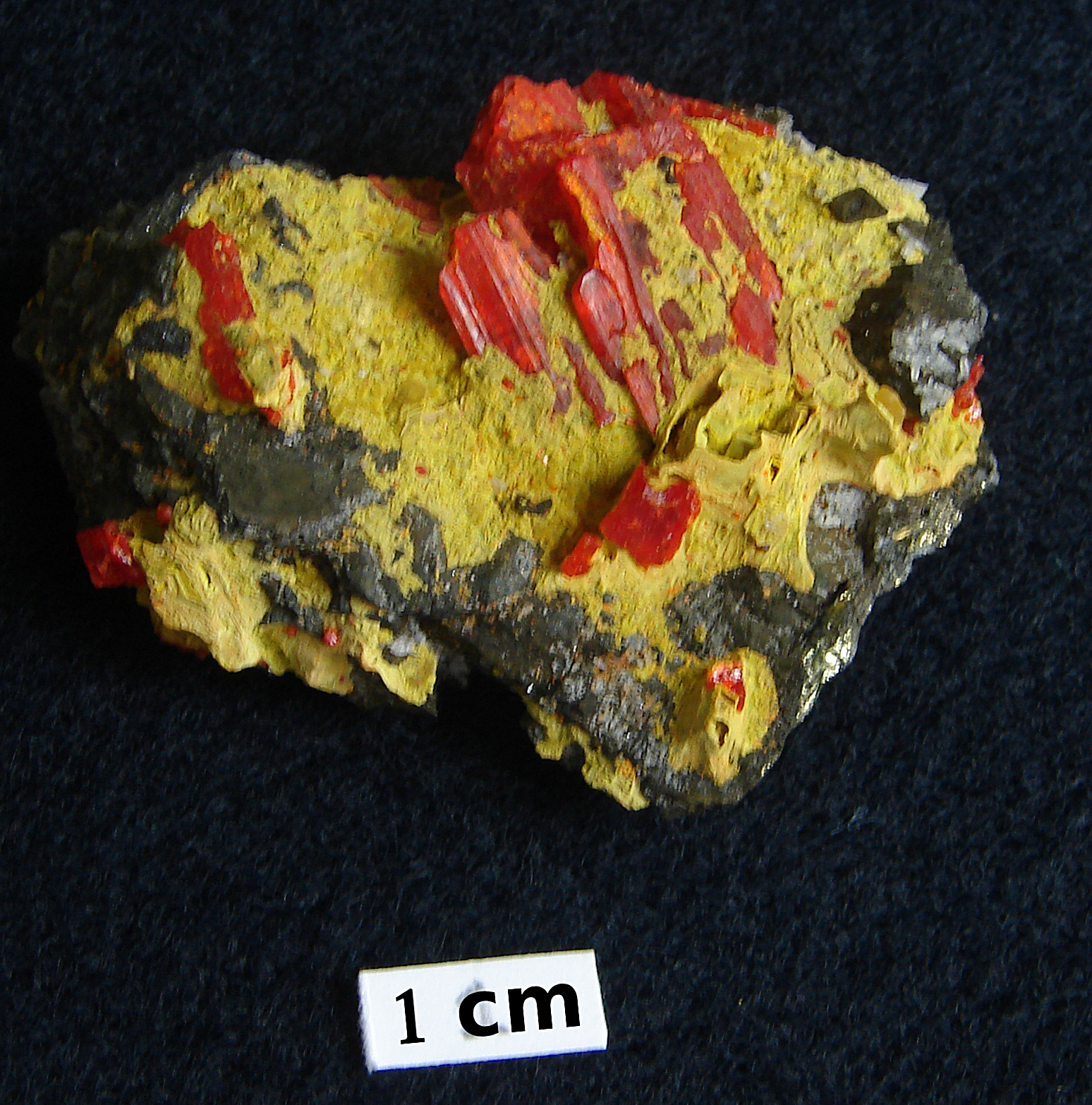
Orpiment and Realgar on the same rock

Orpiment is a type of lemon-yellow to golden- or brownish-yellow crystal commonly found in foliated columnar or fibrous aggregates, may alternatively be botryoidal or reniform, granular or powdery, and, rarely, as prismatic crystals. Used as a pigment, orpiment's color is often described as a lemon- or canary-yellow, and occasionally as a golden- or brownish-yellow.

In the Munsell color system, "orpiment" is designated "brilliant yellow", Munsell notation 4.4Y 8.7 /8.9.

=== Orpiment and realgar ===
Orpiment and realgar are closely related minerals and are often categorized in the same group. They are both arsenic sulfides and belong to the monoclinic crystal system. They are found in the same deposits and can form in the same geologic environments. As a result, orpiment and realgar share similar physical properties and histories of use by humans.

In Chinese, the names for orpiment and realgar are Ci-Huang and Xiong-Huang, respectively meaning "female yellow" and "male yellow". Their names symbolize their close natural conjunction, both physically in terms of their occurrence and properties and culturally in Chinese traditions.

Orpiment and realgar can be distinguished by their different visual characteristics. While orpiment typically has a vibrant golden-yellow color, realgar, in contrast, normally has an orange or reddish hue.

== Permanence and conservation ==
Yellow orpiment (As_{2}S_{3}) degrades into arsenic oxides. Because of their solubility in water, arsenic oxides readily migrate to the surrounding environment. In painted works using orpiment, migrating, degraded arsenic oxides are often detectable throughout the multi-layered paint system. This widespread arsenic migration has consequences for the conservation of orpiment as a pigment in works of art.

Orpiment is also sensitive to light exposure, decaying into a friable white arsenic trioxide over time. Similarly, on ancient, orpiment-coated manuscript paper in Nepal, orpiment used to deter insects has often turned white over time.

Because of orpiment's solubility and instability as a pigment, preventing the degradation of orpiment may need to be prioritized in art conservation. Proper conservation methods should minimize exposure to strong light. Such methods should emphasize humidity control and avoid the use of water-based cleaning agents.

== Use by artists ==
Orpiment has historically been used in artworks in many locales in the Eastern Hemisphere. It was one of the few clear, bright-yellow pigments available to artists until the 19th century.

=== Historical and regional use of orpiment ===
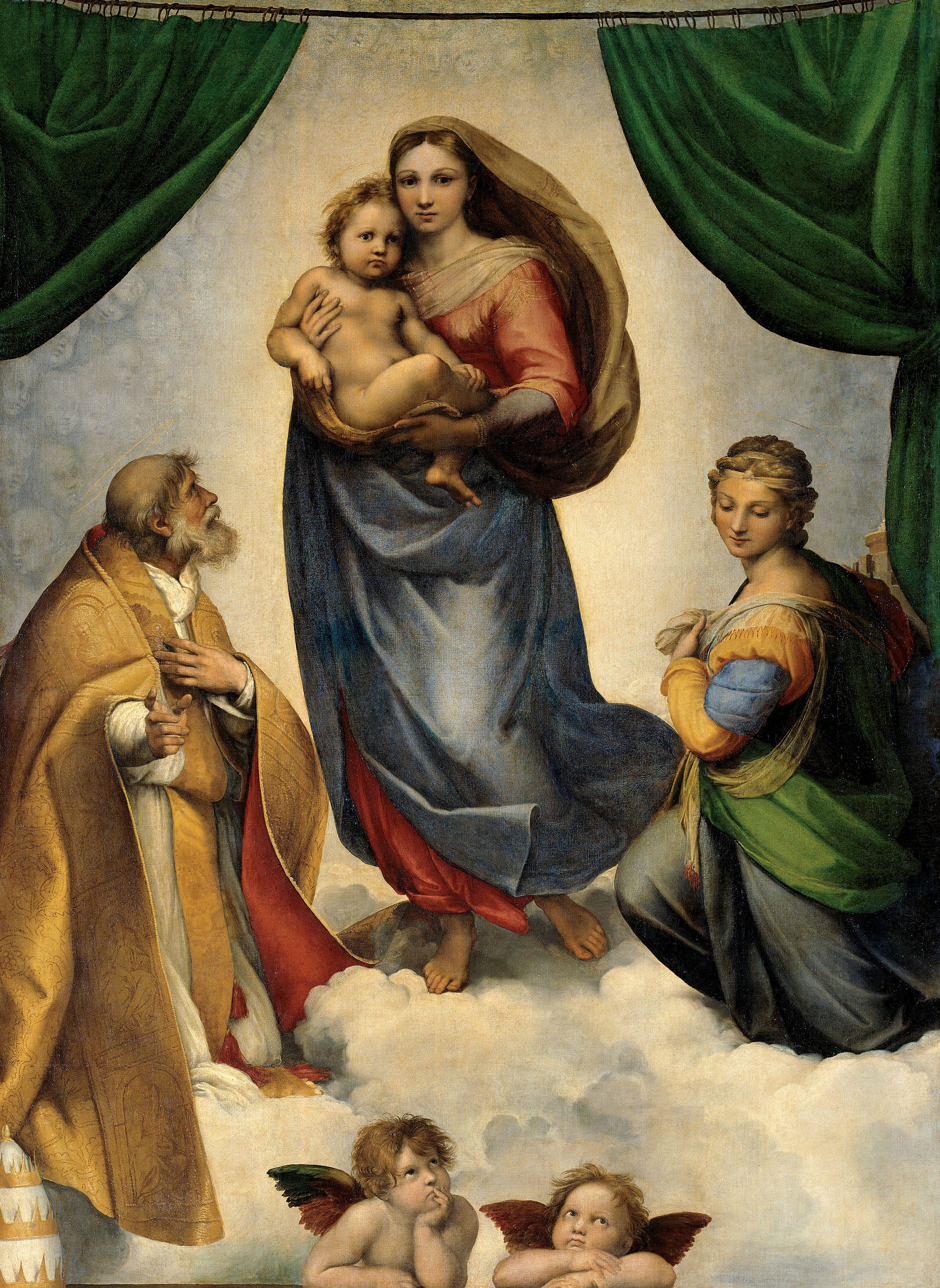
Raphael (1483–1520), Sistine Madonna (1513–14)

In India, orpiment was used as a yellow pigment in actors' facial makeup for dramatic performances. A verse in Hāla's Sattasaī compares a flowering field to an actress whose face is painted with yellow orpiment. Peter Khoroche and Herman Tieken date the anthology's compilation to between the third and seventh centuries CE. Sanskrit names for orpiment include naṭabhūṣaṇa (नटभूषण) and naṭamaṇḍana (नटमण्डन), both meaning "actor's ornament".

In Egypt, lumps of orpiment pigment have been found in a fourteenth-century BC tomb. In China, orpiment is known to have been used to color Chinese lacquer, despite no written sources mentioning this. Orpiment has also been identified on Central Asian wall paintings from the sixth to the thirteenth centuries. In a traditional Thai painting technique, still in use today, yellow ink for writing and drawing on black paper manuscripts is made using orpiment.

Medieval European artists imported orpiment from Asia Minor. Orpiment has been identified on Norwegian wooden altar frontals, polychrome sculptures, and folk art objects, including a crucifix. It was also used in twelfth- to sixteenth-century Eastern Orthodox icons from Bulgaria, Russia, and the former Yugoslavia. In Venice, records show that orpiment was purchased for a Romanian prince in 1600. European use of orpiment was uncommon until the nineteenth century, during which it saw use as a pigment in Impressionist paintings.

Anonymous, The Wilton Diptych (c 1395-9), The National Gallery, London.

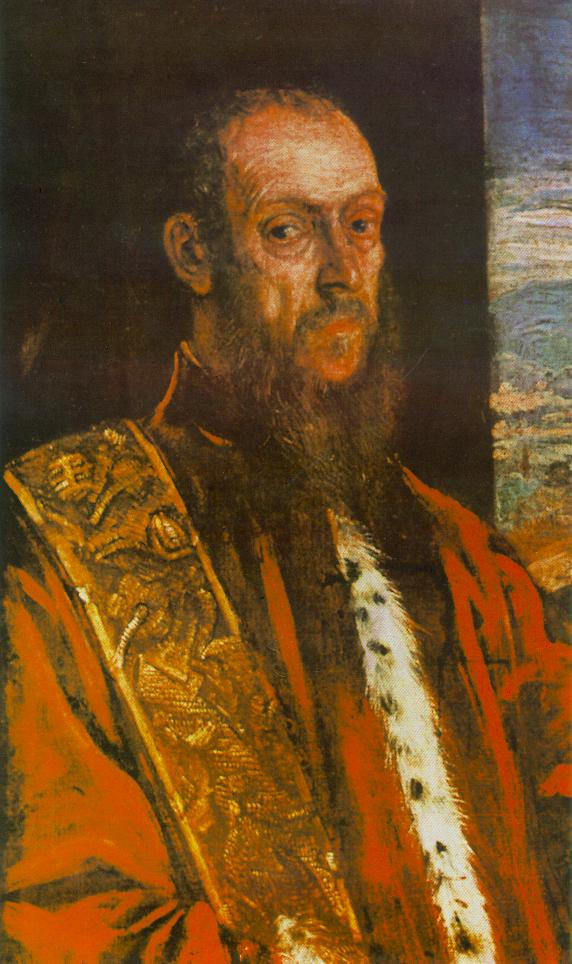
Jacopo Tintoretto (c 1518–1594), Portrait of Vincenzo Morosini, The National Gallery (Presented by the Art Fund), London.

=== Orpiment as a pigment ===
In the Medieval Norwegian church of Tingelstad, orpiment was used in painting the altar frontal.

Orpiment was commonly combined with indigo dye to make a dark, rich green. In the Wilton Diptych (c. 1395–9), this green pigment was used in egg tempera on the left panel for the green cloak of Edmund the Martyr.

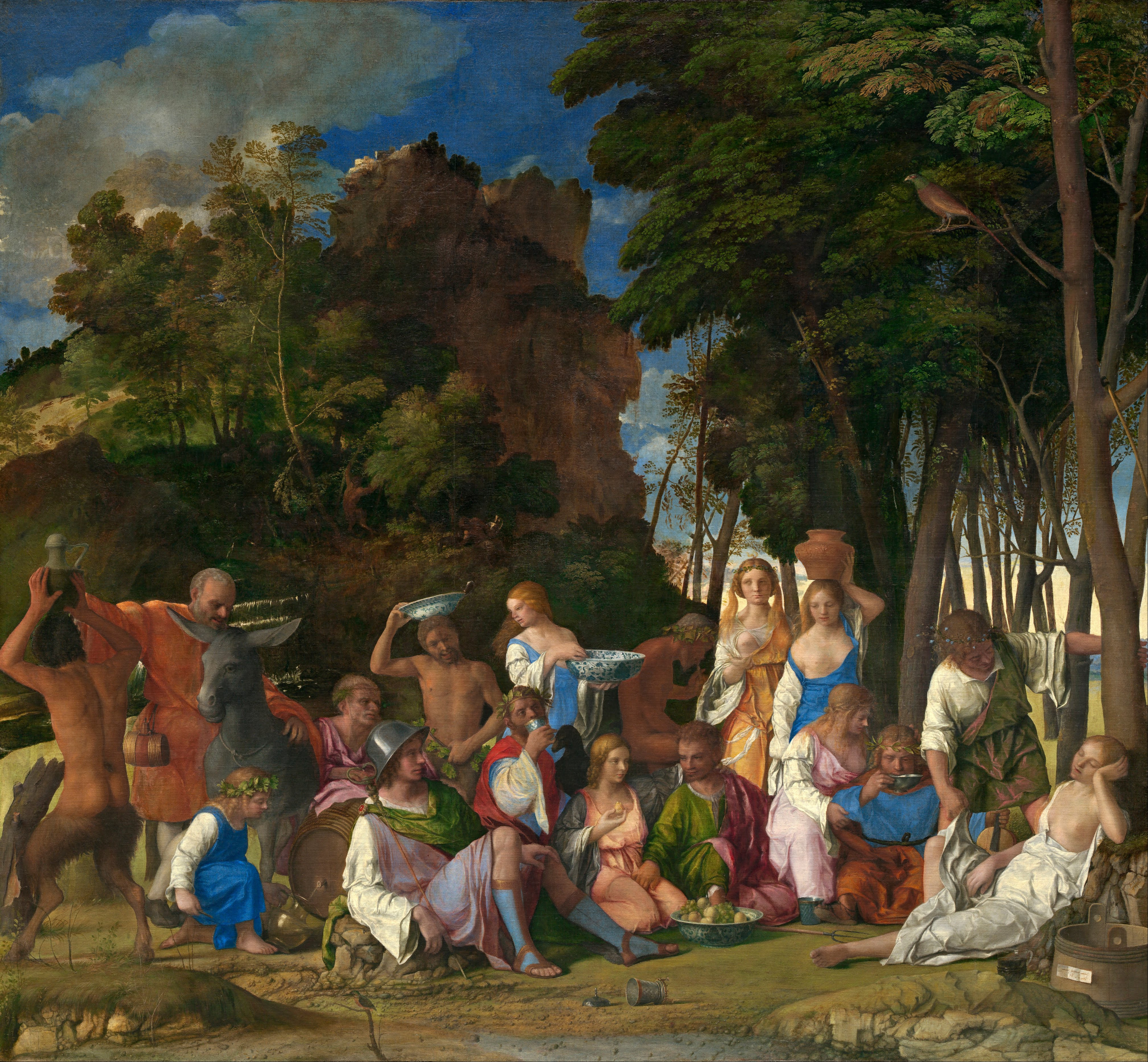
Giovanni Bellini (c. 1430–1516) and Titian (d. 1576), The Feast of the Gods (1514–1529), National Gallery of Art, Washington, DC; Wikimedia Commons

Renaissance artists such as Raphael also used orpiment as a yellow pigment. In Raphael's Sistine Madonna from 1513–14, orpiment is used to achieve yellow on the clothing of the figures and in the background.

Tintoretto's Portrait of Vincenzo Morosini from about 1575–80 uses the pigment in its details. Orpiment is used to replicate the gold embroidery on Morosini's embroidered stole and to highlight the fur of the spotted ferret on his chest.

=== Limitations ===
Orpiment was one of the few clear, bright-yellow pigments available to artists until the 19th century. Its extreme toxicity and incompatibility with other, common, pigments, including lead and copper-based substances such as verdigris and azurite, meant that its use as a pigment ended when cadmium yellows, chromium yellows and organic aniline dye-based colors were introduced during the 19th century.

== Other historical uses ==
Orpiment was traded in the Roman Empire and was used as a medicine in China, even though it is very toxic. It has been used as fly poison and to tip arrows with poison. Because of its striking color, it was of interest to alchemists, both in China and Europe, searching for a way to make gold. It also has been found in the wall decorations of Tutankhamun's tomb and ancient Egyptian scrolls, and on the walls of the Taj Mahal. For centuries, orpiment was ground down and used as a pigment in painting and for sealing wax, and was even used in ancient China as a correction fluid. Orpiment is mentioned in the 17th century by Robert Hooke in Micrographia for the manufacture of small shot. Scientists like Richard Adolf Zsigmondy and Hermann Ambronn puzzled jointly over the amorphous form of As_{2}S_{3}, "orpiment glass", as early as 1904.

== Industrial use ==
Orpiment is used in the production of infrared-transmitting glass, oil cloth, linoleum, semiconductors, photoconductors, pigments, and fireworks. Mixed with two parts of slaked lime (calcium hydroxide), orpiment is still commonly used in rural India as a depilatory. It is used in the tanning industry to remove hair from hides.

Orpiment has been used as bookends. In 2023, the UK Office for Product Safety and Standards recalled 40 pieces sold by TK Maxx between June and October 2022, due to the mineral's toxicity.

== Crystal structure ==
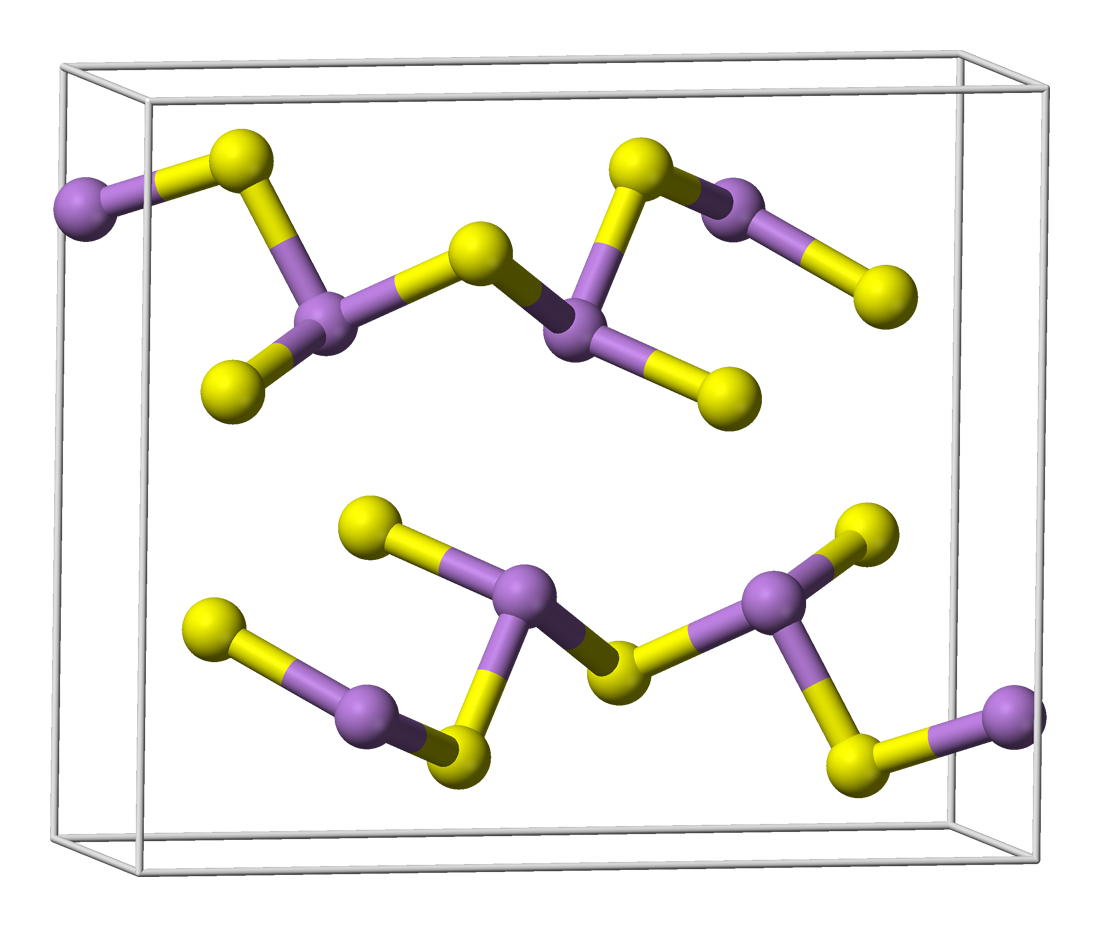
Orpiment's unit cell

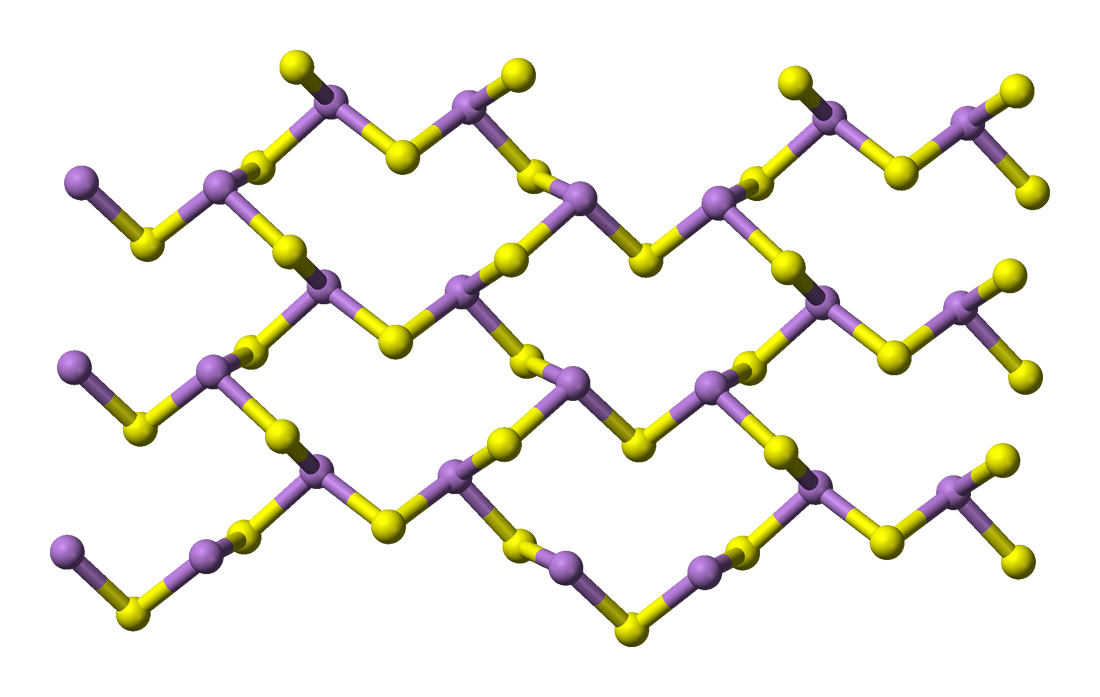
Orpiment's crystal structure consists of sheets

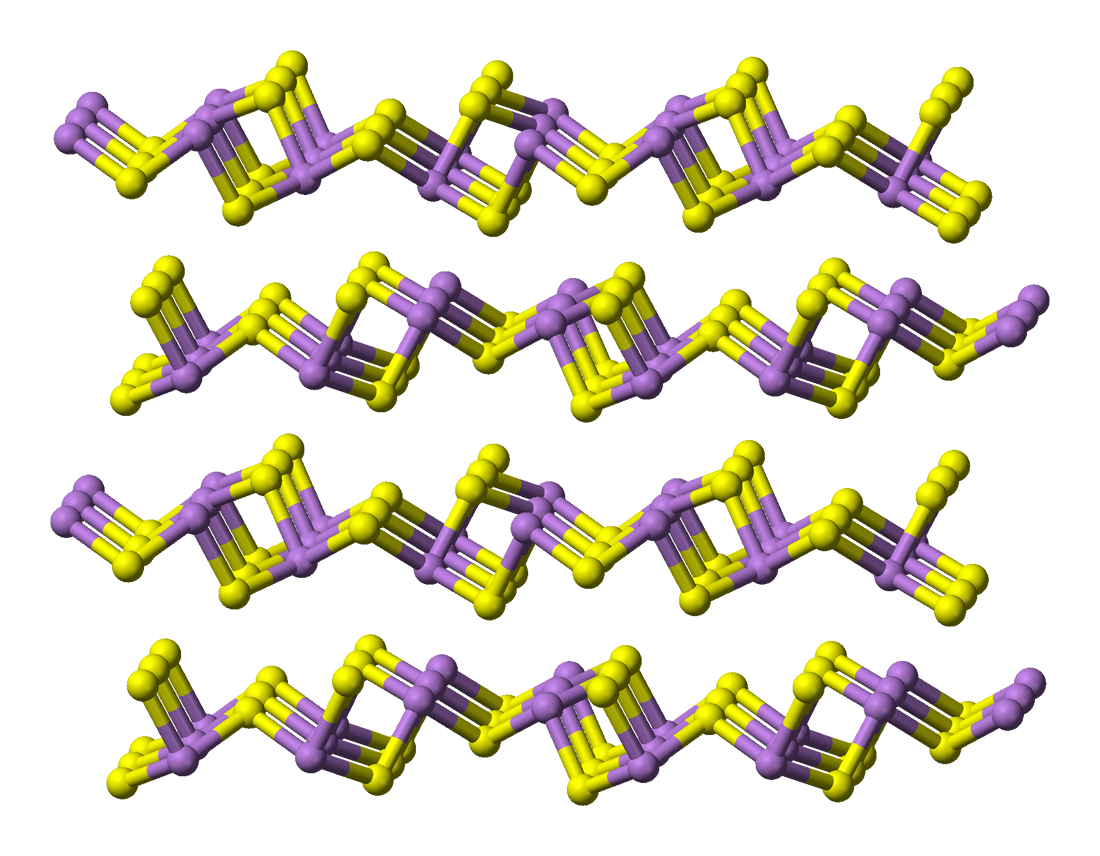
The sheets are stacked into layers

== Gallery ==
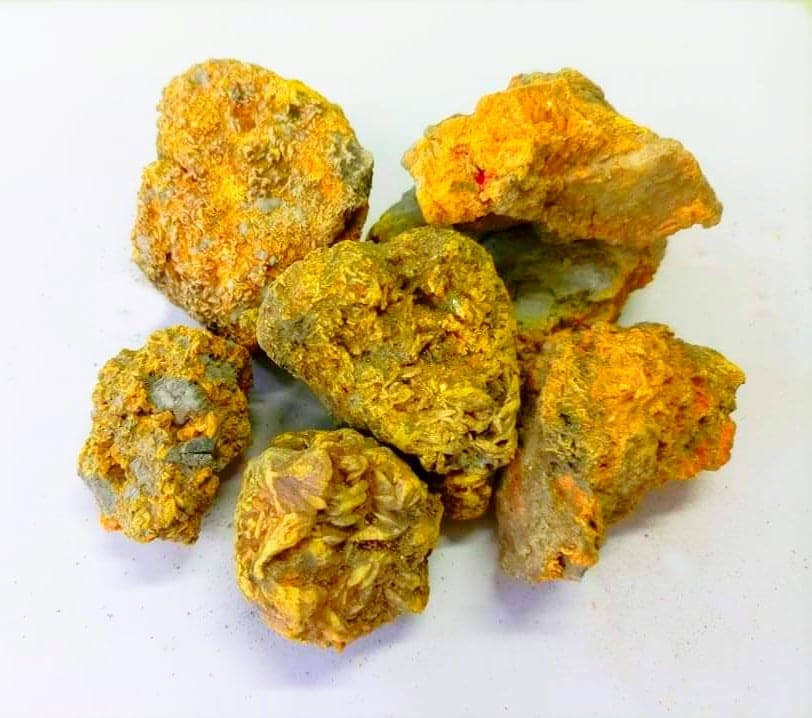
Orpiment from Racha, northern Georgia region

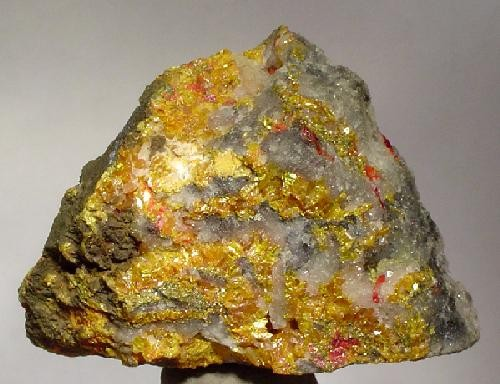
Orpiment and realgar on a vuggy, quartz matrix, Nishinomaki Mine, Gunma Prefecture, Japan

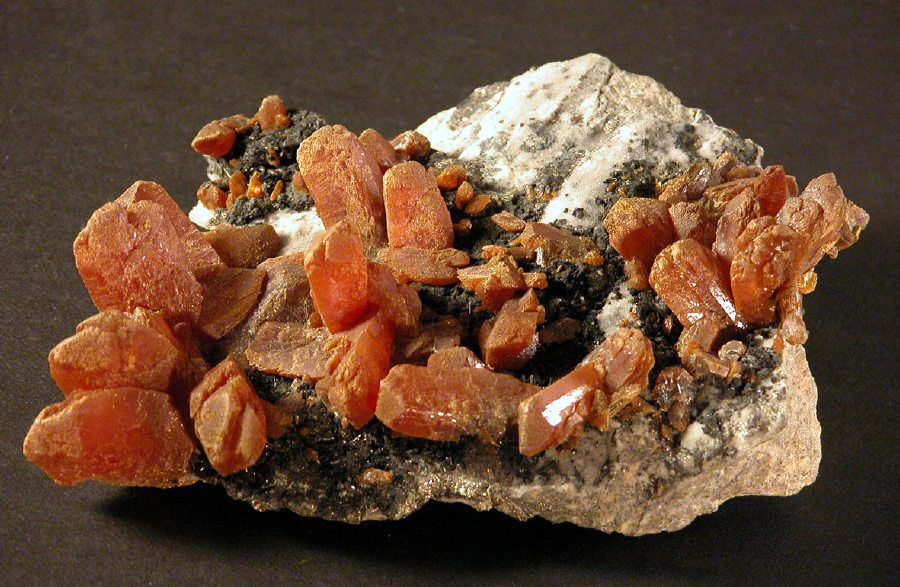
Orpiment from La Libertad, Quiruvilca, Peru

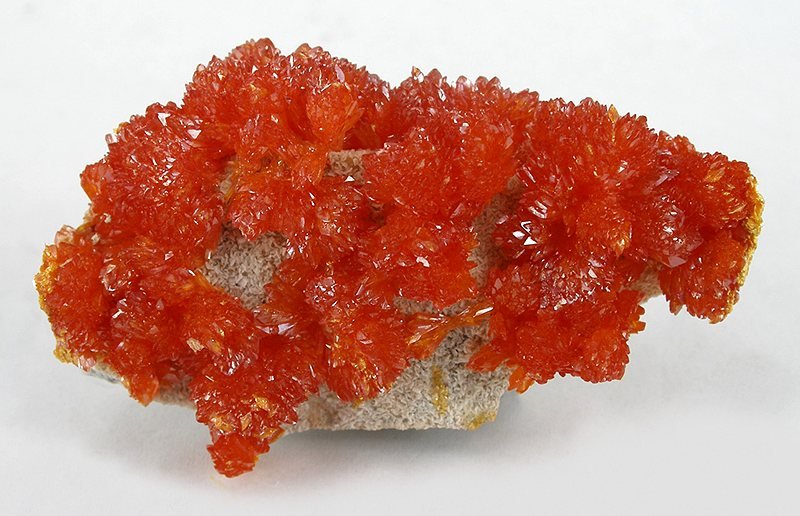
El'brusskiy arsenic mine, Kabardino-Balkarian Republic, Northern Caucasus Region, Russia

== See also ==
- List of inorganic pigments
