= Boveda (company) =

American manufacturing company

Boveda Inc.
- Boveda's official logo since 2012
- Type: Privately held company
- Industry: Manufacturing
- Founded: Minnetonka, Minnesota, United States; (July 1, 1997; 29 years ago, as Humidipak Inc.; March 2012; 14 years ago, re-branded as Boveda Inc.)
- Founder: Sean Knutsen; Timothy Swail; Robert Esse; Albert Saari
- Headquarters: 10237 Yellow Circle Drive Minnetonka, Minnesota, United States
- Area served: Worldwide
- Key people: Sean Knutsen (President & CEO); Timothy Swail (Executive Vice President for Marketing)
- Products: Boveda, humidipak, the humidor bag, Vivi
- Website: bovedainc.com

Boveda Inc., formerly known as Humidipak Inc., is a manufacturing company based in Minnetonka, Minnesota, United States. It specializes in humidity control for a multitude of industries and applications. It was founded on July 1, 1997.

The company's technologies are used by cigar companies for shipping and distributing cigars, cigar connoisseurs for storing and aging fine cigars, art museums and collectors for conserving fine art, food manufacturers for extending shelf-life and improving the flavor delivered to consumers, musical instrument manufacturers and musicians for maintaining instruments over a lifetime, to extend the shelf life of cannabis, and by users for many other applications.

== History ==
The official logo of Humidipak Inc. from 1997 until it was re-branded as Boveda Inc. in 2012.

The technology behind Humidipak was co-engineered by formulations chemist Albert Saari and by Robert Esse, a packaging expert, in 1996. Saari and Esse both came from General Mills Corporation. The company was then founded on July 1, 1997. The company owns patents related to two-way humidity control for packaging, including multi-purpose Humidipaks that manage moisture, absorb oxygen and control mold.

In 2008, Rocky Patel Premium Cigars started to manufacture a custom-printed Humidipak humidity control packet in order to make the cigars properly humidified. Between 2010 and 2014, Ashton Distributors Inc., was the exclusive U.S. distributor of the Humidipak and Boveda brands for the premium cigar market. Boveda now self-distributes.

Humidipak Inc. was re-branded as Boveda Inc. in the International Premium Cigar & Pipe Retailers Association (IPCPR) 2012 convention.

== Technology ==
Boveda produces small pouches for humidity buffering of an enclosed container. The pouches consist of an aqueous salt solution within a sealed vapor barrier package that can absorb or release water vapor until an equilibrium humidity is reached between the solution and relative humidity of the surrounding air.

The air, in turn, serves as the transfer medium to moderate the water content of articles in the container, such as a wooden musical instruments, food, cigars, or cannabis. Water is transferred between the article, the pouch, and the air within the container until an equilibrium condition is reached. The relation between relative humidity of the air in the container and the moisture content of the article is complex, and can be described by a moisture sorption isotherm curve.

The tendency for the solution in a pouch to retain rather than release water vapor is determined by the composition of the salts in solution. A single-salt solution will reliably produce an environment of a known equilibrium humidity. For example, at 20 °C, a saturated solution of table salt in distilled water will produce a relative humidity of approximately 75% within a container. Magnesium chloride will result in an equilibrium humidity of approximately 32%. Such salt solutions are accurate enough to be used to calibrate hygrometers. Other equilibrium humidity levels can be produced through mixtures of salts.

The pouches are made of a material that is permeable to water vapor but not to the solution within.

== Marketing and distribution ==
Numerous companies use the Boveda technology in their product packaging to maintain relative humidity throughout the supply chain. As of 2015, Boveda self-distributes their products for the cigar market in the United States. Internationally, Boveda has numerous distributors in Canada, South America, Southeast Asia & East Asia, Europe and South Africa. D'Addario distributes Boveda's line of Humidipak humidity control products for the music industry.

=== Market applications ===
The initial market application for Humidipak was engineered for cigars. As of 2014, Boveda is carried in over 2,500 stores globally.

Because 2-way humidity control is engineered to maintain a very specific, predetermined level of relative humidity (+/- 2% RH), the technology is being used to solve moisture-related packaging problems for many different industries and applications.

Some of these new applications are herbal medicine and medical cannabis, wooden instruments, pet food, and electronics.

Boveda products are available in many relative humidity (RH) levels ranging from 32% to 83% RH.

== Awards ==
Year	Organization	Awards	Category	Nominated	Results	Source
2023	Boisdale Cigar Awards	Smoker of the Year Awards 2023	Cigar Accessory of the Year	Boveda	Won	
2022	Business Journal	Best Places to Work 2022	Medium company			
2022	O'Cannabiz	O'Cannabiz Industry Awards Gala 2022	Cannabis Industry Brand of the Year	Boveda Inc.'s Boveda Humidity Control	Won	
2022	Grow Up	Best Packaging Equipment	Best Packaging Equipment	Boveda	Won	
2021	Business Journal	Best Places to Work 2021	Medium company		1st	
2021	MG Magazine	America's Top Cannabis Employers	Top Cannabis Employers	Boveda	Won	
2020	Business Journal	Best Places to Work 2020	Small company		16th	
2020	Cigar Journal Magazine	Cigar Journal Awards	Best Cigar Accessory	Boveda Inc.'s Boveda Humidity Control	Won	
2019	Business Journal	Best Places to Work 2019	Small company			
2019	O'Cannabiz	O'Cannabiz Industry Awards Gala 2019	People's Choice - Best Cannabis Accessory	Boveda Inc.'s Boveda Humidity Control	Won	
2019	MG Magazine	Top 50 Cannabis Employers of 2019				
2018	MG Magazine	Best Companies to Work for in Cannabis				
2018	GreenState	GreenState Cannabis Awards 2018	Excellence in Products - Accessories	Boveda Inc.'s Boveda Humidity Control	Won	
2017	Cigar Journal Magazine	Cigar Journal Awards	Best Cigar Accessory	Boveda Inc.'s Boveda Humidity Control	Won	
2015	Cigar Journal Magazine	Cigar Journal Awards	Best Cigar Accessory	Boveda Inc.'s Boveda Humidity Control	Won	
2012	Cigar Journal Magazine	Cigar Journal Awards	Best Cigar Accessory	Boveda Inc.'s Boveda Humidity Control	Won	
