= Dehydrating agent =

Dehydrating agent may refer to:

- a chemical compound used to drive a dehydration reaction
- a desiccant, a substance that absorbs moisture from its surroundings
