= Polycal =

Polycal can refer to:

- An ultra fine form of calcium oxide used as a desiccant.
- A commercial polymer of glucose used as an energy supplement.
