= Dehumidifier =

Device which reduces humidity

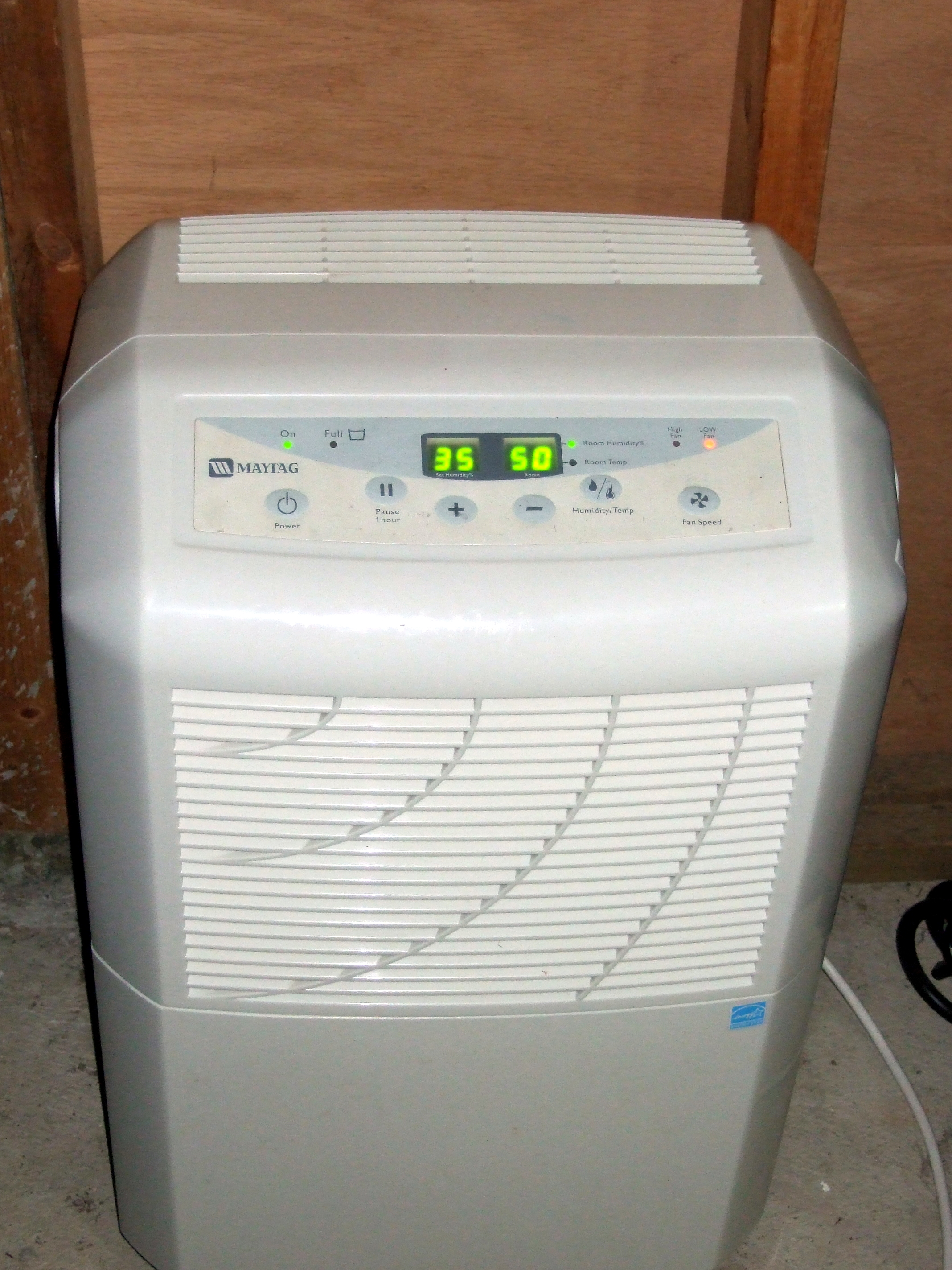
A typical "portable" dehumidifier can be moved about on built-in casters.

A dehumidifier is an air conditioning device which reduces and maintains the level of humidity in the air. This is done usually for health or thermal comfort reasons or to eliminate musty odor and to prevent the growth of mildew by extracting water from the air. It can be used for household, commercial, or industrial applications. Large dehumidifiers are used in commercial buildings such as indoor ice rinks and swimming pools, as well as manufacturing plants or storage warehouses. Typical air conditioning systems combine dehumidification with cooling, by operating cooling coils below the dewpoint and draining away the water that condenses.

Dehumidifiers extract water from air that passes through the unit. There are two common types of dehumidifiers: condensate dehumidifiers and desiccant dehumidifiers, and there are also other emerging designs.

Condensate dehumidifiers use a refrigeration cycle to collect water known as condensate, which is normally considered to be greywater but may at times be reused for industrial purposes. Some manufacturers offer reverse osmosis filters to turn the condensate into potable water.

Desiccant dehumidifiers (known also as absorption dehumidifiers) bond moisture with hydrophilic materials such as silica gel. Cheap domestic units contain single-use hydrophilic substance cartridges, gel, or powder. Larger commercial units regenerate the sorbent by using hot air to remove moisture and expel humid air outside the room.

An emerging class of membrane dehumidifiers, such as the ionic membrane dehumidifier, dispose of water as a vapor rather than liquid. These newer technologies may aim to address smaller system sizes or reach superior performance.

The moisture removal efficiency of dehumidifiers can vary widely.

== History ==
The first dehumidifier was created by American inventor Willis Carrier in 1902 to dehumidify a Brooklyn printing plant. Carrier cited the discovery as later motivating further discoveries in air conditioning. These "active" dehumidifiers condensed water from air. However, "passive" humidity control, such as increased natural ventilation, has been used since ancient times.

== Types ==
=== Thermal condensation ===
These methods rely on drawing air across a cold surface. Since the saturation vapor pressure of water decreases with decreasing temperature, the water in the air condenses on the surface, separating the water from the air.

==== Refrigeration (electric) ====
Electric refrigeration dehumidifiers are the most common type of dehumidifiers. They work by drawing moist air over a refrigerated evaporator with a fan. There are 3 main types of evaporators. They are coiled tube, fin and tube, and microchannel technology.

The cold evaporator coil of the refrigeration device condenses the water, which is removed, and then the air is reheated by the condenser coil. The now dehumidified, re-warmed air is released into the room. This process works most effectively at higher ambient temperatures with a high dew point temperature. In cold climates, the process is less effective. Highest efficiency is reached above 20 °C (68 °F) and 45% relative humidity. This relative humidity value is higher if the temperature of the air is lower.

This type of dehumidifier differs from a standard air conditioner in that both the evaporator and the condenser are placed in the same air path. A standard air conditioner transfers heat energy out of the room because its condenser coil releases heat outside. However, since all components of the dehumidifier are in the same room, no heat energy is removed. Instead, the electric power consumed by the dehumidifier remains in the room as heat, so the room is actually heated, just as by an electric heater that draws the same amount of power.

In addition, if water is condensed in the room, the amount of heat previously needed to evaporate that water also is re-released in the room (the latent heat of vaporization). The dehumidification process is the inverse of adding water to the room with an evaporative cooler, and instead releases heat. Therefore, an in-room dehumidifier will always warm the room and reduce the relative humidity indirectly, as well as reducing the humidity more directly, by condensing and removing water.

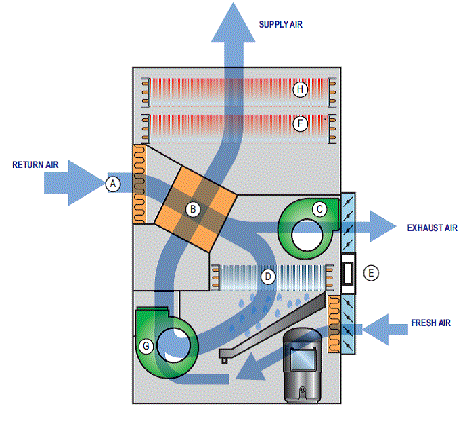
Diagram showing airflow through a heat-recovering dehumidifier

Warm, moist air is drawn into the unit at A in the diagram above. This air passes into a crossflow plate heat exchanger (B) where a substantial proportion of the sensible heat is transferred to a cool supply air stream. This process brings the extracted air close to saturation. The air then passes to the plenum chamber of the extract fan (C) where a portion of it may be rejected to outside. The amount that is rejected can be varied and is determined either by legislation on fresh air requirements, or by the requirement to maintain a fresh, odour free environment. The balance of the air then passes into the evaporator coil of the heat pump where it is cooled and the moisture is condensed. This process yields substantial amounts of latent energy to the refrigeration circuit. Fresh air is then introduced to replace the amount that was extracted and the mix is discharged by the supply fan (G) to the crossflow plate exchanger (B) where it is heated by the extract air from the pool. This pre-warmed air then passes through the heat pump condenser (F) where it is heated by the latent energy removed during the condensation process as well as the energy input to the compressor. The warm dry air is then discharged to the room.

==== Conventional air conditioners ====
A conventional air conditioner is very similar to an electric dehumidifier and inherently acts as a dehumidifier when chilling the air. In an air conditioner, however, the air passes over the cold evaporator coils and then directly into the room. It is not re-heated by passing over the condenser, as in a refrigeration dehumidifier. Instead, the refrigerant is pumped by the compressor to a condenser which is located outside the room to be conditioned, and the heat is then released to the outside air. Conventional air conditioners use additional energy exhausting air outside, and new air can have more moisture than the room needs, such as a pool room that already holds a high amount of moisture in the air.

The water that condenses on the evaporator in an air conditioner is usually routed to remove extracted water from the conditioned space. Newer high-efficiency window units use the condensed water to help cool the condenser coil by evaporating the water into the outdoor air, while older units simply allowed the water to drip outside.

==== Spray ====
When water is chilled below the atmospheric dew point, atmospheric water will condense onto it faster than water evaporates from it. Spray dehumidifiers mix sprays of chilled water and air to capture atmospheric moisture. They also capture pollutants and contaminants like pollen, for which purpose they are sometimes called "air washers".

==== Makeshift ====
Because window air conditioner units have condensers and expansion units, some of them can be used as makeshift dehumidifiers by sending their heat exhaust back into the same room as the cooled air, instead of the outside environment. If the condensate from the cooling coils is drained away from the room as it drips off the cooling coils, the result will be room air that is drier but slightly warmer.

However, many window air conditioners are designed to dispose of condensate water by re-evaporating it into the exhaust air stream, which cancels out the air humidity decrease caused by the condensation of moisture on the cooling coils. To be effective as a dehumidifier, an air conditioner must be designed or modified so that most or all of the water that condenses is drained away in liquid form, rather than re-evaporated. Even if condensate is drained, a modified air conditioner is still less efficient than a single-purpose appliance with a design optimized for dehumidification. Dehumidifiers are designed to pass air directly over the cooling coils and then the heating coils in a single efficient pass through the device.

In addition, most air conditioners are controlled by a thermostat which senses temperature, rather than a humidistat that senses humidity and is typically used to control a dehumidifier. A thermostat is not designed for the control of humidity, and controls it poorly if at all.

==== Ice buildup ====
Under certain conditions of temperature and humidity, ice can form on a refrigeration dehumidifier's evaporator coils. The ice buildup can impede airflow and eventually form a solid block encasing the coils. This buildup prevents the dehumidifier from operating effectively, and can cause water damage if condensed water drips off the accumulated ice and not into the collection tray. In extreme cases, the ice can deform or distort mechanical elements, causing permanent damage.

Better-quality dehumidifiers may have a frost or ice sensor. These will turn off the machine and allow the ice-covered coils to warm and defrost. Once defrosted, the machine usually will automatically restart. Most ice sensors are simple thermal switches and do not directly sense the presence or absence of ice buildup. An alternative design senses the impeded airflow and shuts off the cooling coils in a similar manner.

Certain malfunctions of dehumidifiers, such as partial loss of refrigerant, can cause repeated icing of the coils. This condition requires repair or replacement of the equipment.

==== Thermoelectric ====
Thermoelectric dehumidifiers use a Peltier heat pump to cool a surface and condense water vapor from the air. The design is simpler and has the benefit of being quieter compared to a dehumidifier with a mechanical compressor. However, because of its relatively poor coefficient of performance, this design is mainly used for small dehumidifiers. Ice buildup may be a problem, similar to problems with refrigeration dehumidifiers.

=== Absorption/desiccant ===
This process uses a desiccant (humidity-absorbing material) to absorb moisture. The saturated material is then moved and the collected moisture is discharged, typically via heating.

Dehumidifiers that work according to the absorption principle are well-suited for high humidity at low temperatures. They are often used in industry to achieve humidity levels below 35%.

Because of the absence of compressor parts, desiccant dehumidifiers are often lighter and quieter than compressor dehumidifiers. Desiccant dehumidifiers can operate at lower temperatures as the unit does not need cooled coils.

Initial installation costs have limited the acceptance of desiccant dehumidification, worsened by lack of understanding of operational benefits, lack of technology awareness, and company priorities.

=== Membrane ===
Several approaches can remove water vapor by flowing air past a membrane that allows vapor to enter. Dehumidification with membranes can allow for water vapor removal without condensation; this avoids the energy required with the enthalpy of vaporization, offering high efficiency for well-designed systems. Such dehumidification can be done passively with a rejected air stream; see Energy recovery ventilation. Active systems can use pressure gradients or electrocatalytic approaches.

==== Selective membrane ====
Selective membranes use materials that block other ambient gases besides water vapor. Water vapor will then diffuse through these membranes under a concentration difference. Such a difference in concentration (partial pressure) can be caused by vacuum pumping, or simply passing by an airstream with a lower concentration of water. The most efficient configurations save energy by using two membranes that isolate a vacuum pump from ambient air. This dramatically reduces the pressure across the vacuum pump, saving energy. While such systems are often termed "Isothermal Membrane Dehumidification," recent research has shown that these systems can be made more efficient by combining them with heat exchange. Such integration can improve performance by improving the vapor compression cycle's COP (by operating between closer temperatures), and enhancing air mixing near the membrane.. For these systems, flat-sheet membranes may significantly outperform Hollow fiber membranes as the higher pressure drop of the latter provides significant resistance for the large airflow rates of modern HVAC systems.

Selective membranes can be made by immobilizing a liquid that can absorb water (or another solute) within a membranes, dubbed "supported liquid membranes". Typically, there are two layer types; a highly porous membrane that contains the absorbing liquid, and a trapping layer that prevents the liquid from escaping. This liquid absorbing layer allows them to behave like selective membranes, without having a solid selective materials or very small pores. The liquids within which absorbs water well (hygroscopic) may include glycol mixtures or ionic liquids.

==== Ionic membrane ====
An ionic membrane can be used to move humidity into or out of a sealed enclosure, using chemical reactions rather than condensation or selective materials. These systems use electrodes and proton-conducting membranes to remove water vapor by electrolysis. At the anode, H_{2}O is split into protons, O_{2}, and electrons, where the protons travel through a material and react with ambient oxygen on the other side to create water again.

Perhaps the first materials for such electrolysis-based dehumidification were solid polymer electrolyte (SPE) membranes. This approach provides a low power, steady-state dehumidifier for enclosed areas where long-term maintenance is difficult. This electrolytic process delivers dehumidifying capacities ranging from 0.2 grams/day from a 0.2 m³ (7 cu ft) space to 58 grams/day from an 8m³ (280 cu ft). SPE systems generally do not have high dehydration capacities, but because the water vapor is removed through electrolysis, the process is maintenance-free. The process also uses very little electrical energy to operate, requiring no moving parts, making the ionic membranes silent in operation and very reliable over long periods of time. SPE dehumidifiers are typically used to protect sensitive electrical components, medical equipment, museum specimens, or scientific apparatus from humid environments.

The SPE consists of a proton-conductive solid polymer electrolyte and porous electrodes with a catalytic layer composed of noble metal particles. When a voltage is applied to the porous electrode attached to the membrane, the moisture on the anode side (dehumidifying side) dissociates into hydrogen ions (H+) and oxygen. The hydrogen ions migrate through membrane to be discharged on the cathode (moisture discharging) side where they react with oxygen in the air, resulting in water molecules (vapor), being discharged. Oxygen is released from the dehumidifying side, and if a large amount of water has been introduced to an airtight enclosure then oxygen can build up inside the enclosure.

== Condensate ==
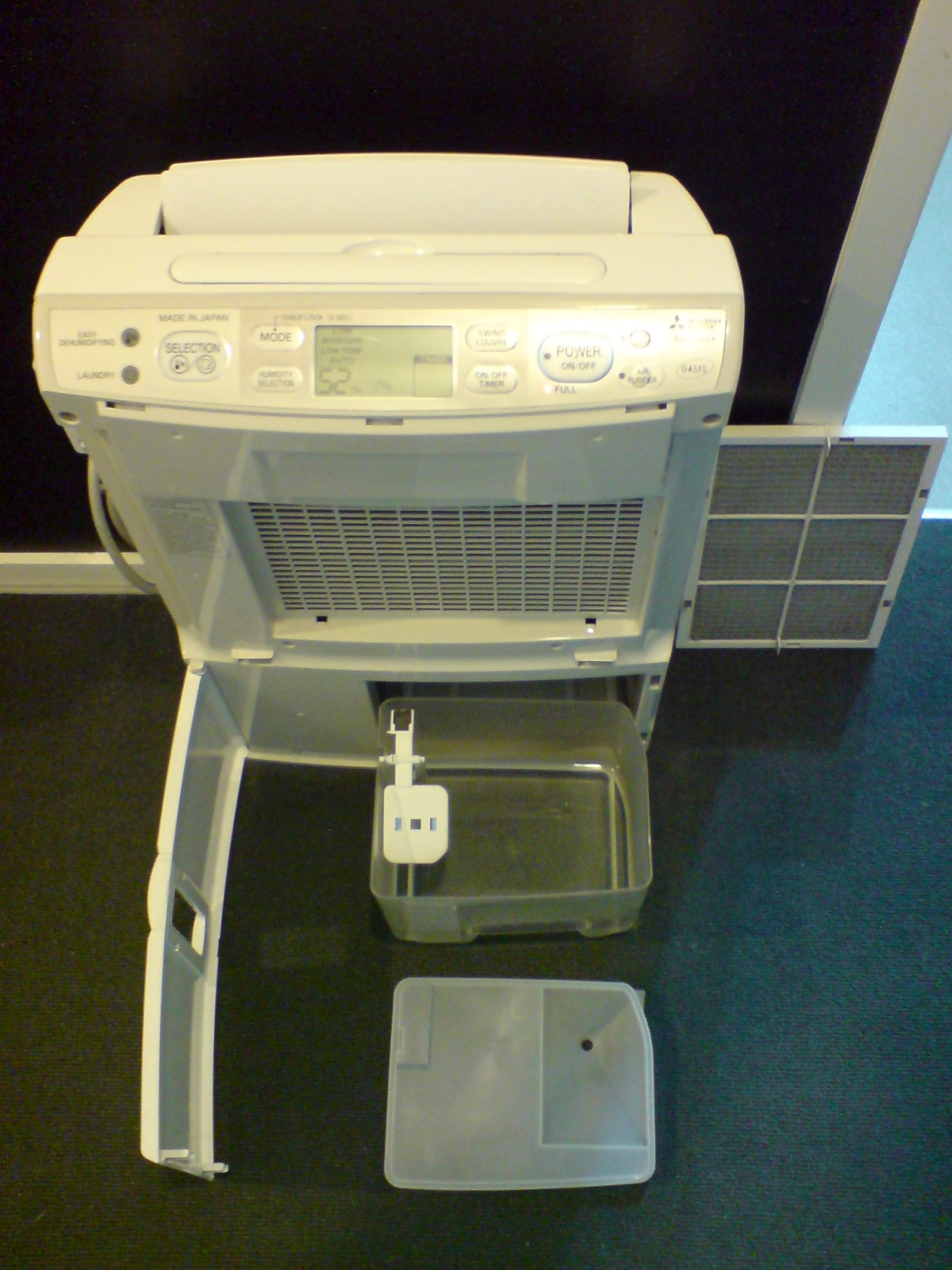
Partially disassembled portable dehumidifier (a Mitsubishi Electric Oasis), with condensate bucket and white-colored float sensor visible at center

Not all dehumidifiers collect condensate; for example, many desiccant types discharge an airflow from the heated desiccant which contains water-saturated air. This can either be recondensed and collected as condensate, or expelled outside. Also, some air conditioner types spray any collected condensate onto the exterior condenser coils to cool it by evaporation, improving overall efficiency.

=== Disposal ===
Products using condensation technology usually have a cold surface where humidity in warm air is condensed, this warm condensation technology allows for dehumidification at sub-zero temperatures.

Most portable dehumidifiers are equipped with a condensate collection receptacle, typically with a float sensor that detects when the collection vessel is full, to shut off the dehumidifier and prevent an overflow of collected water. In a warm humid environment, these buckets will generally fill with water in 8–12 hours, and may need to be manually emptied and replaced several times per day to ensure continued operation.

Many portable dehumidifiers can also be adapted to connect the condensate drip output directly to a drain via a hose. Some dehumidifier models can tie into plumbing drains or use a built-in water pump to empty themselves as they collect moisture. Alternatively, a separate condensate pump may be used to move collected water to a disposal location, when gravity drainage is not possible.

Central air conditioning units typically need to be connected to a drain, because frequent manual emptying of multiple containers of condensate water extracted by such systems is impractical. If the condensate water is directed into the sewer system, it should be suitably trapped to prevent septic odors and sewer gases from entering the building. The condensate should not be directed into a septic system of a house, because it does not need special treatment as effluent. When the height of the air handler (containing the evaporator) is above the level of the surface drains used for rainwater, the condensate drain lines can often be routed into them. Air handlers located below grade level, e.g. the basement of a house, may need to use a condensate pump to lift the water to a surface drain.

=== Potability ===
Generally, dehumidifier water is considered a rather clean kind of greywater: not suitable for drinking, but acceptable for watering plants, though not garden vegetables. The health concerns are:

- The water contains trace metals from the heat exchanger, such as copper and aluminum, or zinc from galvanized steel supporting the frame and drain pan. Condensate would only be exposed to tin-lead solder in copper drain pipe, but the lead content is particularly dangerous. Trace metals may pose a danger if used on edible plants, as they can bioaccumulate. However, the water is considered usable for irrigation of ornamental plants and lawns.
- Various pathogens, including fungal spores, may accumulate in the water, particularly due to its stagnancy. Unlike in distilled water production, the water is not boiled, which would kill pathogens (including bacteria).
- As with distilled water, beneficial minerals are largely absent.

Food-grade dehumidifiers, also called atmospheric water generators, are specifically designed to avoid toxic metal contamination and to keep all water contact surfaces clean. The devices are primarily intended to produce pure water, and the dehumidifying effect is viewed as secondary to their operation.

== Maintenance ==
If condensate water is handled automatically, most dehumidifiers require very little maintenance. Because of the volume of airflow through the appliance, dust buildup needs to be removed so it does not impede airflow; many designs feature removable and washable air filters. Condensate collection trays and containers may need occasional cleaning to remove debris buildup and prevent clogging of drainage passages, which can cause water leakage and overflow; if large amounts of certain particulates or dust are collected, then this may need to be performed frequently to avoid microbial growth.

== Applications ==
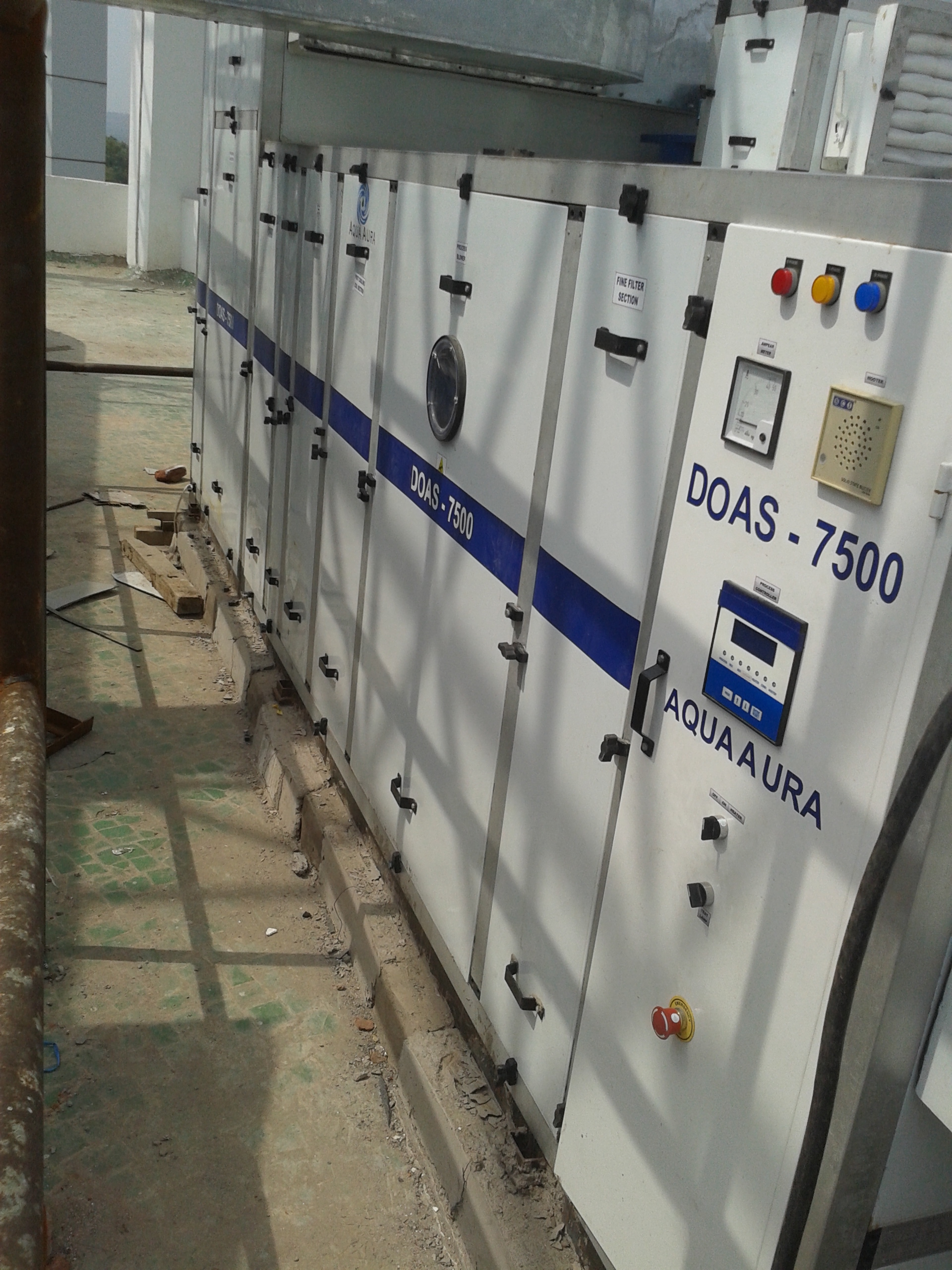
A large industrial dehumidifier for offices and homes

Relative humidity in dwellings should preferably range from 30% to 50%.

=== Homes and offices ===
Dehumidification within buildings can control:

- excessive body perspiration buildup that cannot evaporate in moisture-saturated air
- condensation dripping from cold-water pipes
- warping and sticking of furniture and doors
- mold and mildew, which can cause fabrics, books, and furnishings to develop mustiness
- clothes moths, fleas, cockroaches, silverfish, woodlice, millipedes, and dust mites, which thrive in damp conditions (basements, crawl spaces, kitchens, bedrooms, bathrooms, spas or indoor pool areas, warehouses, workshops)
- Drying clothes. Compared to a heated clothes dryer, dehumidifiers can dry clothes in confined spaces using a fraction of the energy.

=== Construction ===
Dehumidifiers are also used in construction areas and renovations of indoor space to remove excess humidity or mildew.

=== Industrial processes ===
Dehumidifiers are used in industrial climatic chambers, to reduce relative humidity and the dew point in many industrial applications from waste and fresh water treatment plants to indoor grow rooms where the control of moisture is essential.

== Market size ==
According to a 2015 estimate, the projected annual global total addressable market of dehumidifiers was about $3.5 billion by 2022. This includes various types and applications, encompassing different applications such as household and industrial and different technologies such as ventilating and desiccant.

== See also ==
- Air ionizer, a different device for conditioning air
- Atmospheric water generator, a machine that extracts pure drinking water from air
- Cromer cycle, a cycle that combines a desiccant with air conditioner as dehumidifier
- Food dehydrator, device for decreasing moisture in food, to prevent spoilage
- Humidifier, an appliance that increases the humidity of air
- Shoe dryer
- Thermoelectric cooling
