= Convectant drying =

Drying assembly method

Convectant drying is a drying assembly method. It was developed in 1999 by Charles Cressy as an alternative to conventional refrigerant and desiccant dehumidifier drying techniques. In July 2013 British Standards PAS 64 "Mitigation and recovery of water damaged buildings - Code of practice" was published recognising and including descriptions of the process within the document.

Convectant drying is described as: "the balanced manipulation and control of air exchanges, heat, and vapour pressure differential to create optimum conditions for evaporation, reduction and control of airborne moisture from the indoor environment".

Convectant drying equipment is available in portable and trailer mounted form.

The method has been granted international patents. US Patent 6662467: U.S. Provisional Application No. 61/194,062, US20100011612 and for a portable hand truck method. Also, a GB Patent No 0813169.0.

Both systems use heat, air exchanges and controlled manipulation of the indoor environment to reduce the drying time compared to traditional methods.

== Method of operation ==
The temperature in the target area is increased by recirculating its air through the machine's conditioning system. The system heats and lowers the relative humidity of the air being conditioned. The conditioned air is fed into the target drying area either directly or through ducts. The structure gradually warms up and vapor pressure is lowered - promoting evaporation. Evaporated water increases the relative humidity in the drying area. This could result in evaporation ceasing if saturation is achieved and secondary damage to the target area or to other areas of the property not originally damaged. So, to deal with this the process can either switch to exhaust mode in the portable systems, expelling the wet air to the outside or repeatedly venting the air to the outside via a heat exchanger in the trailer process. As wet air is expelled and at the same time, outside fresh air in equal amounts is drawn into the systems conditioning system and it is then introduced back into the room to repeat the process until the property is dry. A dry state is determined when the exhaust specific humidity drops below intake specific humidity at which stage the heater and machines air exchange fans are automatically turned off and the technician notified by email or text that the building is dry. Unlike traditional dehumidifiers, convectant systems work efficiently across all temperature ranges.

== Benefits of rapid drying ==
Added advantages of the convectant drying system are that the system controls the environment being dried, removing the potential for mold proliferation and expelling airborne particulates, odours and mold spores to the outside. In addition to the benefits of a faster drying process, use of the process can result in significant reduction in: the need to strip out structural components, secondary damage, environmental impacts, overall cost savings relating to the incident - in particular when being used on more severe water damage or construction drying projects.

== Other methods of drying ==
Refrigerant dehumidifiers, conventional Operation range 65 to 90 °F (18 to 32 °C). Temperatures above or below are out of the effective range. Inexpensive, portable, easy to set up. If used properly and in sufficient quantities can reduce RH to 60%.

Low Grain refrigerants (LGRs) Effective in lower temperature conditions than conventional refrigerants. Manufacturers claim 33 degrees Fahrenheit. Humidity levels to 40% RH. More expensive and more labor-intensive than conventional dehumidifiers. Can be an effective structural drying tool.

Desiccant dehumidifiers Work on the principle of adsorption. Wet air is attracted to moisture adsorbent material. Operation range is from 10 °F to 90 °F. Excellent structural drying tool, can lower RH to 5%. Does not operate on the principles of heat and therefore can be used year-round in all environments.

== See also ==
- Water damage
- Mold prevention
- Dehumidifier - primarily describes smaller units
