= M-SG reducing agent =

Chemical reagent prepared by absorbing alkali metal into silica gel

In M-SG an alkali metal is absorbed into silica gel at elevated temperatures. The resulting black powder material is an effective reducing agent and safe to handle as opposed to the pure metal. The material can also be used as a desiccant and as a hydrogen source.

The metal is either sodium or a sodium–potassium alloy (Na_{2}K). The molten metal is mixed with silica gel under constant agitation at room temperature. This phase 0 material must be handled in an inert atmosphere. Heating phase 0 at 150 °C (302 °F) takes it to phase I. When this material is exposed to dry oxygen the reducing power is not affected. At further heating to 400 °C (752 °F) phase II can be handled safely in an ambient environment.

M-SG reductions: benzyl chloride reduction to bibenzyl, dibenzothiophene reduction to biphenyl and naphthalene reduction to dihydronaphthalene

The metal reacts with the silica gel in an exothermic reaction in which Na_{4}Si_{4} nanoparticles are formed. The powder reacts with water to form hydrogen.

Compounds such as biphenyl and naphthalene are reduced by the powder and form highly coloured radical anions. The powder can also be introduced in a column chromatography setup and eluted with organic reactants in order to probe the reducing power. The powder is mixed with additional (wet) silica gel which provides additional hydrogen. A Birch reduction of naphthalene takes 5 minutes elution time. The column converts benzyl chloride to bibenzyl in a Wurtz coupling and in a similar fashion dibenzothiophene is reduced to biphenyl.

== See also ==
- Potassium graphite
