= Cromer cycle =

Thermodynamic cycle

The Cromer cycle is a thermodynamic cycle that uses a desiccant to interact with higher-relative-humidity air leaving a cold surface. When a system is taken through a series of different states and finally returned to its initial state, a thermodynamic cycle is said to have occurred. The desiccant absorbs moisture from the air leaving the cold surface, releasing heat and drying the air, which can be used in a process requiring dry air. The desiccant is then dried by an air stream at a lower relative humidity, where the desiccant gives up its moisture by evaporation, increasing the air's relative humidity and cooling it. This cooler, moister air can then be presented to the same cold surface as above to take it below its dew point and dry it further, or it can be expunged from the system.

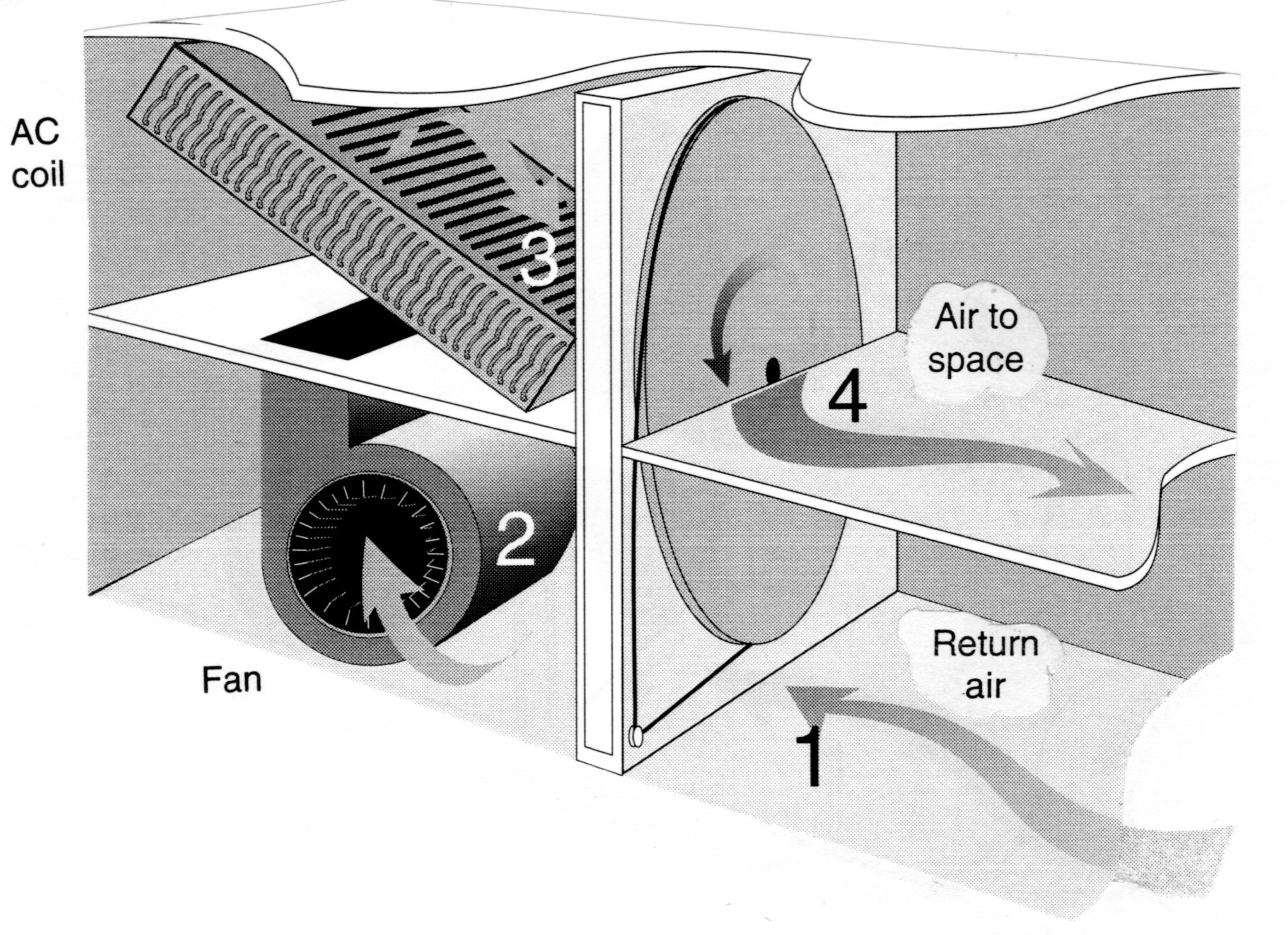
Figure 1: Cromer cycle

The desiccant undergoes a reversible process whereby in the first part of the cycle, it absorbs or adsorbs moisture from air leaving a cold surface, releasing heat, and then in the second part of the cycle evaporates moisture, absorbing heat and returning the desiccant to its original state to complete the cycle again. The result of the Cromer cycle is that the process air leaving the cycle is dehumidified further (higher latent ratio) than it would be leaving the cold surface without the cycle. The Cromer cycle concept was originally patented in the mid-1980's. Those patents have expired and thus the cycle is free for anyone to use. The cycle was first publicized in 1997 by Popular Mechanics in its Tech Update section.

== Psychrometrics ==
The Cromer cycle is primarily used in air conditioning and drying applications. The cold surface portion of the cycle is most often a result of a reversed Carnot or refrigeration cycle. For the Cromer cycle to operate, a desiccant must be exposed to two air streams, one with higher humidity from a cold surface, and one with lower humidity to dry it. This is most easily accomplished by moving the desiccant. Any cycling mechanism can be used, such as pumping a liquid desiccant; however, an easy mechanical application is a rotating wheel, loaded with desiccant, through which the different air streams pass. This is shown in Figure 1, where a desiccant wheel has been applied to a standard air conditioning set-up.

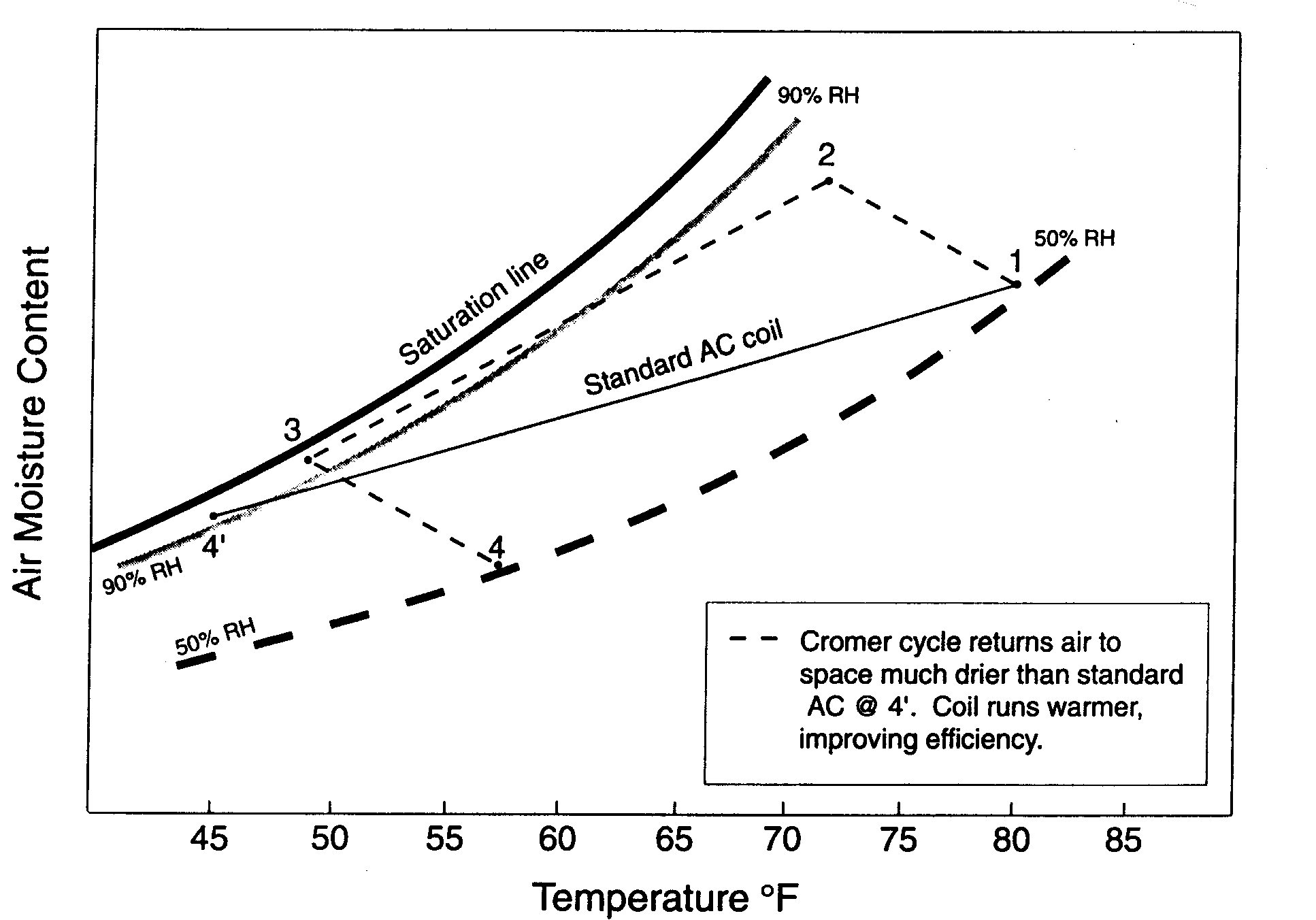
Figure 2: On a standard psychrometric chart, the air flow state points of the Cromer cycle are shown.

The psychrometric process of the air passing through the system with four state points is shown on the psychrometric chart of Figure 2 as 1, 2, 3 and 4. The state points of the air are also depicted in Figure 1. In this application, the air returning from the space, typically around 50% relative humidity (RH), is presented to the desiccant wheel and dries the desiccant. The air picks up moisture and cools in process 1 to 2. The moist air is now presented to the cooling surface (cooling coil of the air conditioner), which cools it below its dew point and dries the air in process 2 to 3. This represents the work done by the cold coil. In the meantime, the dried desiccant from below is rotated to the upper air stream. The saturated air leaving the coil, typically 93–98% RH, is presented to the desiccant at 3, where the air is dried further in process 3 to 4, where it is presented to the space as supply air. The desiccant, now loaded with moisture, rotates to the return air, where the cycle repeats.

Typical cooling and drying by the cold coil without the Cromer cycle is depicted on the psychrometric chart and is also shown in Figure 2. State point 1 is the air that returns from the space to the system (return air). For a typical air conditioning system, this air at state point 1 enters the cooling coil and leaves at about state point 4' after cooling and drying. State point 4' represents the temperature and moisture content of the air that leaves the typical unit, about 45–50 °F (7–10 °C) and 95–98% RH.

== Changes to a standard AC system by the Cromer cycle ==
The psychrometric chart depicts the changes of the cycle to the standard air conditioning cycle. First, the end state point 4 for air from the wheel represents a latent ratio increase (moisture removal) to about 45%, as opposed to the 25% of the typical coil shown. Secondly, the air quality delivered by the cycle is much drier, about 55% RH (state point 4), rather than 98% with the standard coil (state point 4'). Third, this is accomplished with a higher average evaporator temperature. Compare the midpoint of the evaporator's temperature, line 1 to 4’, to the midpoint of the Cromer cycle's evaporator's temperature, line 2 to 3. These lines represent the work done by the coil on the air stream (its change in enthalpy). This is significant because, given a constant condenser temperature and equivalent change in enthalpy, the higher the evaporator coil temperature, the more efficient is the Carnot refrigeration cycle and the greater the energy efficiency a particular system can deliver.

Common dehumidification strategies include: reheating (electric or hot-gas reheat), where sensible heat is added to the air leaving the equipment; recuperative heat (run-around coils or heat pipes), where sensible heat is transferred from the return air to the supply air; or the Cromer cycle, where the latent heat of moisture sorption and evaporation is transferred from the return air to the supply air. These various strategies were compared in an ASHRAE Journal article that found that "the Cromer cycle produces similar enhanced dehumidification performance as is obtained with recuperative configurations."

== Desiccants used ==
To operate in this cycle, the desiccant is required to absorb moisture from air coming off of the coil that is colder and about 98% RH and to desorb moisture to air that is warmer and at a lower RH. The desiccant is regenerated by the vapor pressure differential inherent in the RH differences rather than heat or temperature difference. Desiccants that have a moisture sorption isotherm of the type shown in Figure 3 (Type III) are common, such as many formulations of silica gel. Type III desiccants absorb little moisture below 70% RH but many will take up more than their own weight in water from the air when presented with over 90% RH. The absorption isotherm is very steep between 90 and 100% RH. Desiccants of Type III have plenty of potential for the cycling of moisture from the air off of the coil, around 98% RH, over to the return air stream, typically around 50% RH.

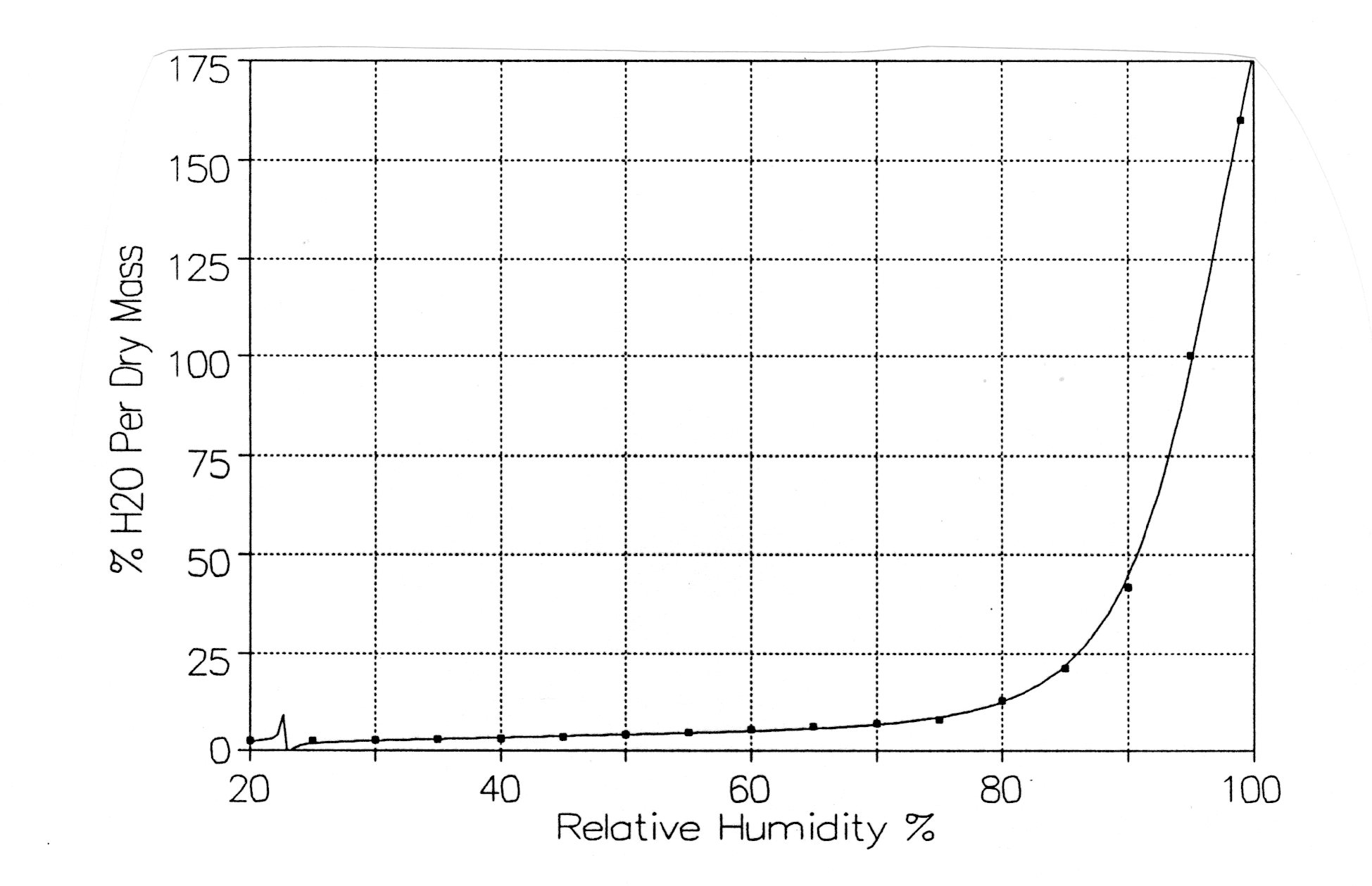

== Field tests ==
In 2011, Khalifa, Al-Omran, and Mohammed reported on a monitored study of a 2-ton-capacity air conditioner unit while exchanging out a silica gel wheel and a wheel made of activated carbon to determine if it would reduce the relative humidity in a small room in Baghdad when compared to the unit without the Cromer cycle added. They found that the "Cromer cycle can reduce the indoor relative humidity from 80% to about 60% using active carbon of 5 cm wheel thickness."

== Incorporating fresh air exchange ==
To maintain indoor air quality, it may be desirable to expunge return air from the conditioned space and replace it with fresh outdoor air, sometimes called "make-up air." The optimal location to expunge return air from a Cromer cycle system is just after the desiccant (location 2 on Figure 1). At this point, the return air has been loaded with moisture from the desiccant, and expunging it removes additional moisture from the space. Furthermore, this expunge air is cooled below the return air condition by the desiccant's evaporation of the moisture into it. Location 2 (but before the fan) is also the ideal place to bring outdoor air into the system, as the coil can then reduce its temperature and moisture before it enters the space. Also, if heat exchange is provided between the expunged air and the outdoor air, the incoming air can be cooled and brought near to or at saturation before it enters the cooling coil for process 2 to 3, enhancing its dehumidification.

== Dehumidifier ==
When the process needed is more dehumidification or drying, the Cromer cycle can be enhanced by using the free heat available from the condensing side of the reverse Carnot refrigeration cycle. This heat, sometimes called "hot gas bypass" can be added before the desiccant wheel to enhance the drying of the wheel at location 1 of Figure 1 (but after the filter), called pre-heat. Hot gas bypass heat can also be added to the process at location 4, called reheat, which delivers warmer but even lower RH supply air. Either one or both hot gas bypass locations can be used. When a Cromer cycle air conditioning system is enhanced with hot gas bypass, it is typically referred to as "active" Cromer cycle air-conditioning. When the cycle is used as equipment designed for dehumidification or drying, it is typically called a Cromer cycle dehumidifier or Cromer cycle dryer.

R&D magazine recognized the Cromer cycle in 2006 with an R&D 100 Award in the mechanical/materials category, recognizing the year's 100 most significant technological innovations.
