= Moisture removal efficiency =

Dehumidification measurement

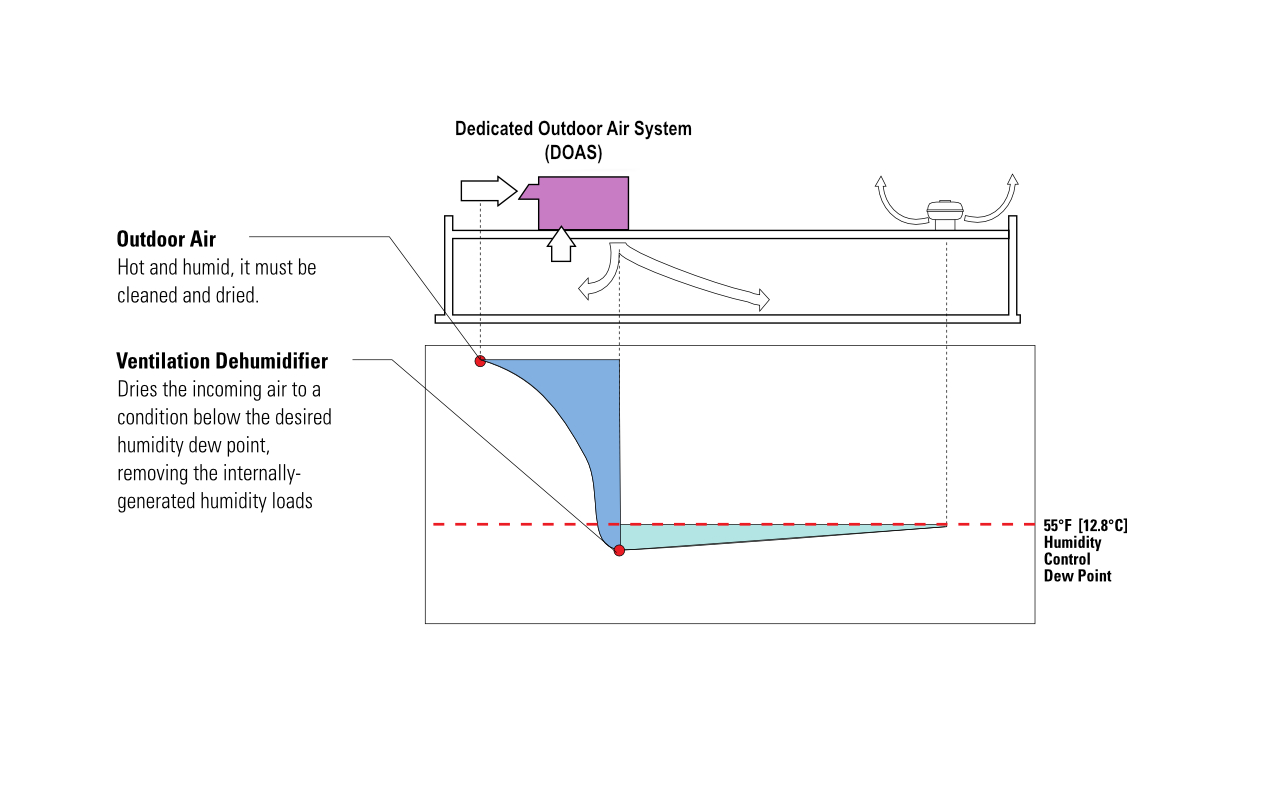
DOAS Diagram

Moisture Removal Efficiency (MRE) is a measure of the energy efficiency of any dehumidification process. Moisture removal efficiency is the water vapor removed from air at a defined inlet air temperature and humidity, divided by the total energy consumed by the dehumidification equipment during the same time period, including all fan and pump energy needed to move air and fluids through the system.

Water vapor removal is expressed as pounds or kilograms. Energy is usually expressed as kilowatt hours. Inlet air temperature is expressed in either degrees Fahrenheit or degrees Celsius. Inlet air humidity may be expressed in several ways, most commonly as the humidity ratio of the inlet air; the weight of water vapor in the air, compared to the weight of the dry air that contains it. An example of the MRE of a dehumidification system could be: 4.4 lb/kWh @ 85 °F, 140 gr/lb. Using the SI system of units, that same MRE would be 2.0 kg/kWh @ 30 °C, 20.0 g/kg.

== History ==
The authority for this definition of moisture removal efficiency is ANSI/AHRI Standard 920, published by the Air Conditioning, Heating and Refrigerlation Institute (AHRI). AHRI is an association of equipment manufacturers. Standard 920 was developed by the group of manufacturing members of AHRI that is concerned with energy efficiency of packaged dedicated outdoor air systems (DOAS equipment). The standard provides an objective and quantitative basis for rating and comparing dehumidification performance and energy consumption of equipment that dehumidifies incoming ventilation and makeup air as part of a building's mechanical systems.

Dehumidification of ventilation and makeup air consumes a great deal of energy worldwide. In all except desert and high-altitude climates, the annual dehumidification load for ventilation air exceeds the annual cooling load for ventilation air by a factor of 2 to 5.

The issue of energy efficiency of dehumidification arises because of regulatory requirements in some nations that demand energy efficiency for buildings’ mechanical systems.

According to members of AHRI's dehumidification product section, the reason for developing Standard 920 was to provide ASHRAE with a neutral and high-quality test method for dehumidification energy efficiency. The committee's goal was to have ASHRAE include minimum dehumidification efficiency requirements in ASHRAE Standard 90.1. That standard is often used as the basis of building energy codes in the US and Canada, and also used worldwide as the baseline for voluntary energy programs such as LEED Certification (Leadership in Energy and Environmental Design)

== Integrated seasonal moisture removal efficiency (ISMRE) ==
To provide a metric that allows estimation of annual rather than instantaneous dehumidification performance of ventilation dehumidification systems, AHRI Standard 920 further defines a test protocol for measuring a system's “integrated seasonal moisture removal efficiency”. This metric is analogous to the seasonal energy efficiency ratio (SEER) that is used to compare cooling energy efficiency of competing equipment.

Like the SEER test methodology, AHRI Standard 920 requires that the dehumidification equipment be tested at several discrete combinations of inlet air temperature and humidity. In the 2015 edition of the standard, four such test conditions are defined. The moisture removal efficiency of the equipment is measured at each of these conditions, and then a proportionality factor is applied to each MRE. The results of those calculations are summed to arrive at the rated ISMRE of the equipment.

== See also ==
- ASHRAE – American HVAC professional association
- ASHRAE 90.1 – Engineering standard
- Air Conditioning, Heating and Refrigeration Institute – North American trade association
- Dehumidifier – Device which reduces humidity
- Seasonal energy efficiency ratio – Cooling output divided by electricity input, as a standard for HVAC systems
- Leadership in Energy and Environmental Design – Standard for green building design
