= Energy conversion efficiency =

Ratio between the useful output and the input of a machine

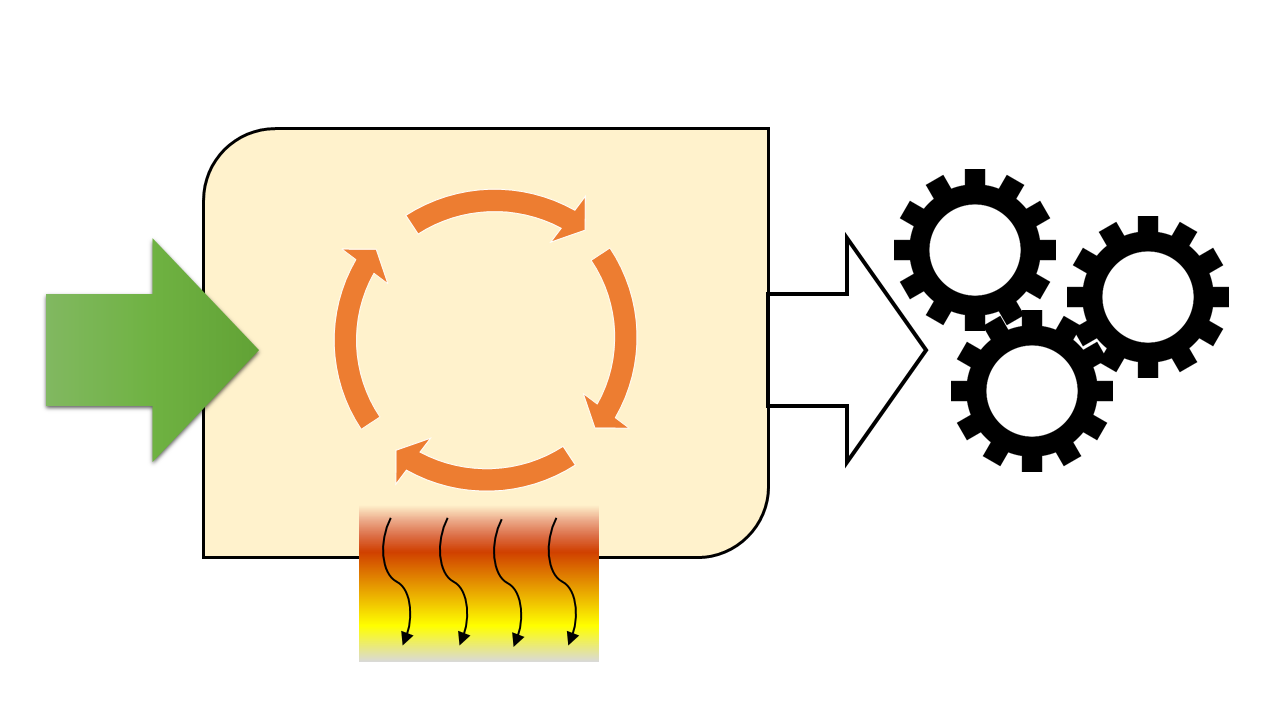
Useful output energy is always lower than input energy.

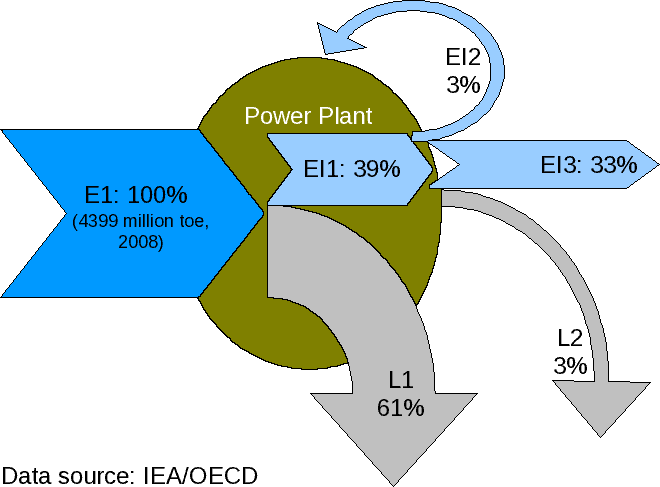
Efficiency of power plants, world total, 2008

Energy conversion efficiency (η) is the ratio between the useful output of an energy conversion machine and the input, in energy terms. The input, as well as the useful output may be chemical, electric power, mechanical work, light (radiation), or heat. The resulting value, η (eta), ranges between 0 and 1.

== Overview ==
Energy conversion efficiency depends on the usefulness of the output. All or part of the heat produced from burning a fuel may become rejected waste heat if, for example, work is the desired output from a thermodynamic cycle. Energy converter is an example of an energy transformation. For example, a light bulb falls into the categories energy converter. $\eta = \frac{P_\mathrm{out}}{P_\mathrm{in}}$ Even though the definition includes the notion of usefulness, efficiency is considered a technical or physical term. Goal or mission oriented terms include effectiveness and efficacy.

Generally, energy conversion efficiency is a dimensionless number between 0 and 1.0, or 0% to 100%. Efficiencies cannot exceed 100%, which would result in a perpetual motion machine, which is impossible.

However, other effectiveness measures that can exceed 1.0 are used for refrigerators, heat pumps and other devices that move heat rather than convert it. It is not called efficiency, but the coefficient of performance, or COP. It is a ratio of useful heating or cooling provided relative to the work (energy) required. Higher COPs equate to higher efficiency, lower energy (power) consumption and thus lower operating costs. The COP usually exceeds 1, especially in heat pumps, because instead of just converting work to heat (which, if 100% efficient, would be a COP of 1), it pumps additional heat from a heat source to where the heat is required. Most air conditioners have a COP of 2.3 to 3.5.

When talking about the efficiency of heat engines and power stations the convention should be stated, i.e., HHV (a.k.a. Gross Heating Value, etc.) or LCV (a.k.a. Net Heating value), and whether gross output (at the generator terminals) or net output (at the power station fence) are being considered. The two are separate but both must be stated. Failure to do so causes endless confusion.

Related, more specific terms include

- Electrical efficiency, useful power output per electrical power consumed;
- Mechanical efficiency, where one form of mechanical energy (e.g. potential energy of water) is converted to mechanical energy (work);
- Thermal efficiency or fuel efficiency, useful heat and/or work output per input energy such as the fuel consumed;
- 'Total efficiency', e.g., for cogeneration, useful electric power and heat output per fuel energy consumed. Same as the thermal efficiency.
- Luminous efficiency, that portion of the emitted electromagnetic radiation is usable for human vision.

== Chemical conversion efficiency ==
The change of Gibbs energy of a defined chemical transformation at a particular temperature is the minimum theoretical quantity of energy required to make that change occur (if the change in Gibbs energy between reactants and products is positive) or the maximum theoretical energy that might be obtained from that change (if the change in Gibbs energy between reactants and products is negative). The energy efficiency of a process involving chemical change may be expressed relative to these theoretical minima or maxima. The difference between the change of enthalpy and the change of Gibbs energy of a chemical transformation at a particular temperature indicates the heat input required or the heat removal (cooling) required to maintain that temperature.

A fuel cell may be considered to be the reverse of electrolysis. For example, an ideal fuel cell operating at a temperature of 25 °C having gaseous hydrogen and gaseous oxygen as inputs and liquid water as the output could produce a theoretical maximum amount of electrical energy of 237.129 kJ (0.06587 kWh) per gram mol (18.0154 gram) of water produced and would require 48.701 kJ (0.01353 kWh) per gram mol of water produced of heat energy to be removed from the cell to maintain that temperature.

An ideal electrolysis unit operating at a temperature of 25 °C having liquid water as the input and gaseous hydrogen and gaseous oxygen as products would require a theoretical minimum input of electrical energy of 237.129 kJ (0.06587 kWh) per gram mol (18.0154 gram) of water consumed and would require 48.701 kJ (0.01353 kWh) per gram mol of water consumed of heat energy to be added to the unit to maintain that temperature. It would operate at a cell voltage of 1.24 V.

For a water electrolysis unit operating at a constant temperature of 25 °C without the input of any additional heat energy, electrical energy would have to be supplied at a rate equivalent of the enthalpy (heat) of reaction or 285.830 kJ (0.07940 kWh) per gram mol of water consumed. It would operate at a cell voltage of 1.48 V. The electrical energy input of this cell is 1.20 times greater than the theoretical minimum so the energy efficiency is 0.83 compared to the ideal cell.

A water electrolysis unit operating with a higher voltage that 1.48 V and at a temperature of 25 °C would have to have heat energy removed in order to maintain a constant temperature and the energy efficiency would be less than 0.83.

The large entropy difference between liquid water and gaseous hydrogen plus gaseous oxygen accounts for the significant difference between the Gibbs energy of reaction and the enthalpy (heat) of reaction.

== Fuel heating values and efficiency ==
In Europe the usable energy content of a fuel is typically calculated using the lower heating value (LHV) of that fuel, the definition of which assumes that the water vapor produced during fuel combustion (oxidation) remains gaseous, and is not condensed to liquid water so the latent heat of vaporization of that water is not usable. Using the LHV, a condensing boiler can achieve a "heating efficiency" in excess of 100% (this does not violate the first law of thermodynamics as long as the LHV convention is understood, but does cause confusion). This is because the apparatus recovers part of the heat of vaporization, which is not included in the definition of the lower heating value of a fuel. In the U.S. and elsewhere, the higher heating value (HHV) is used, which includes the latent heat for condensing the water vapor, and thus the thermodynamic maximum of 100% efficiency cannot be exceeded.

== Wall-plug efficiency, luminous efficiency, and efficacy ==
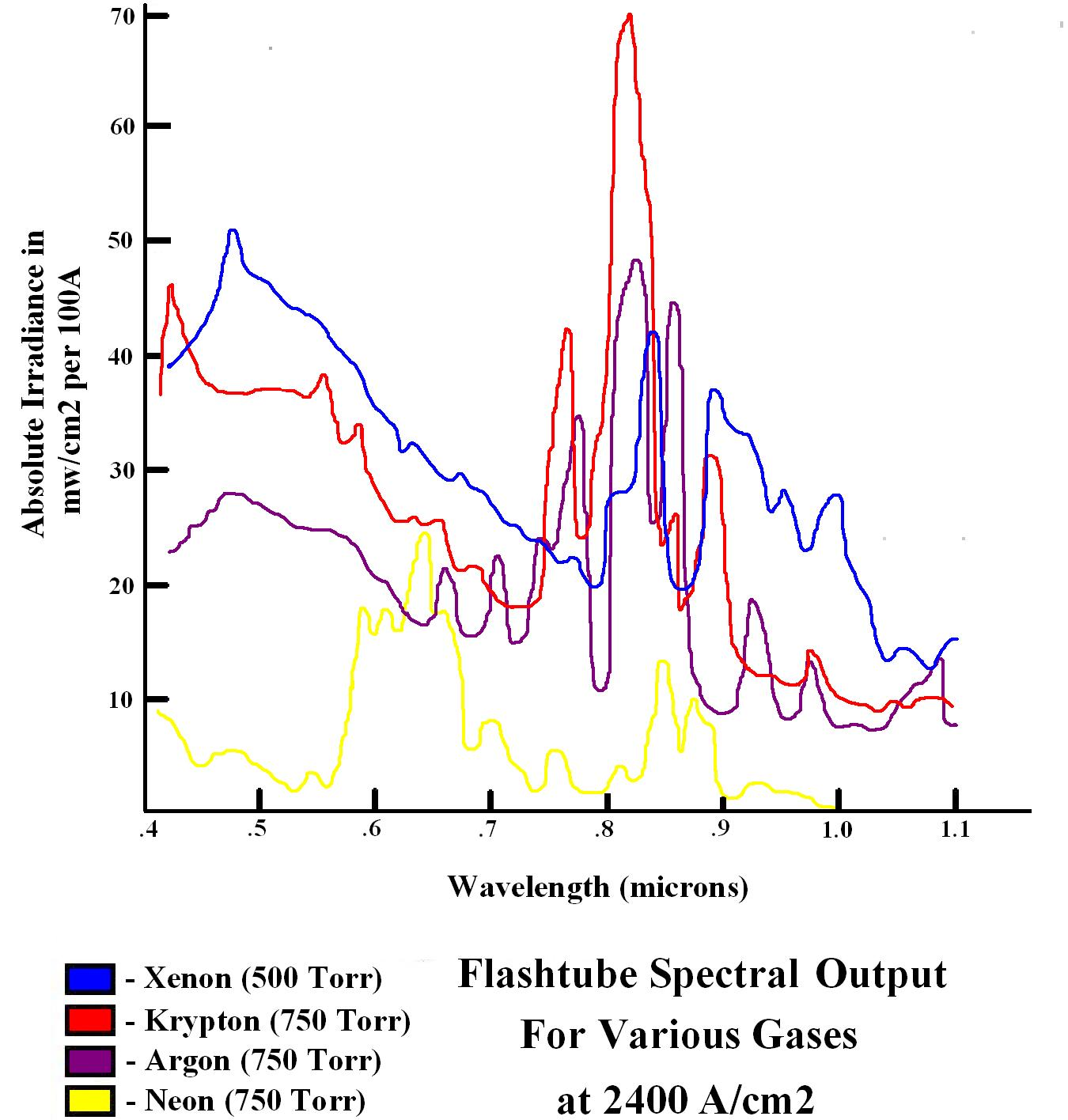
The absolute irradiance of four different gases when used in a flashtube. Xenon is by far the most efficient of the gases, although krypton is more effective at a specific wavelength of light.

The sensitivity of the human eye to various wavelengths. Assuming each wavelength equals 1 watt of radiant energy, only the center wavelength is perceived as 683 candelas (1 watt of luminous energy), equaling 683 lumens. The vertical colored-lines represent the 589 (yellow) sodium line, and popular 532 nm (green), 671 nm (red), 473 nm (blue), and 405 nm (violet) laser pointers.

A Sankey diagram showing the multiple stages of energy loss between the wall plug and the light output of a fluorescent lamp. The greatest losses occur due to the Stokes shift.

In optical systems such as lighting and lasers, the energy conversion efficiency is often referred to as wall-plug efficiency. The wall-plug efficiency is the measure of output radiative-energy, in watts (joules per second), per total input electrical energy in watts. The output energy is usually measured in terms of absolute irradiance and the wall-plug efficiency is given as a percentage of the total input energy, with the inverse percentage representing the losses.

The wall-plug efficiency differs from the luminous efficiency in that wall-plug efficiency describes the direct output/input conversion of energy (the amount of work that can be performed) whereas luminous efficiency takes into account the human eye's varying sensitivity to different wavelengths (how well it can illuminate a space). Instead of using watts, the power of a light source to produce wavelengths proportional to human perception is measured in lumens. The human eye is most sensitive to wavelengths of 555 nanometers (greenish-yellow) but the sensitivity decreases dramatically to either side of this wavelength, following a Gaussian power-curve and dropping to zero sensitivity at the red and violet ends of the spectrum. Due to this the eye does not usually see all of the wavelengths emitted by a particular light-source, nor does it see all of the wavelengths within the visual spectrum equally. Yellow and green, for example, make up more than 50% of what the eye perceives as being white, even though in terms of radiant energy white-light is made from equal portions of all colors (i.e.: a 5 mW green laser appears brighter than a 5 mW red laser, yet the red laser stands-out better against a white background). Therefore, the radiant intensity of a light source may be much greater than its luminous intensity, meaning that the source emits more energy than the eye can use. Likewise, the lamp's wall-plug efficiency is usually greater than its luminous efficiency. The effectiveness of a light source to convert electrical energy into wavelengths of visible light, in proportion to the sensitivity of the human eye, is referred to as luminous efficacy, which is measured in units of lumens per watt (lm/w) of electrical input-energy.

Unlike efficacy (effectiveness), which is a unit of measurement, efficiency is a unitless number expressed as a percentage, requiring only that the input and output units be of the same type. The luminous efficiency of a light source is thus the percentage of luminous efficacy per theoretical maximum efficacy at a specific wavelength. The amount of energy carried by a photon of light is determined by its wavelength. In lumens, this energy is offset by the eye's sensitivity to the selected wavelengths. For example, a green laser pointer can have greater than 30 times the apparent brightness of a red pointer of the same power output. At 555 nm in wavelength, 1 watt of radiant energy is equivalent to 683 lumens, thus a monochromatic light source at this wavelength, with a luminous efficacy of 683 lm/w, would have a luminous efficiency of 100%. The theoretical-maximum efficacy lowers for wavelengths at either side of 555 nm. For example, low-pressure sodium lamps produce monochromatic light at 589 nm with a luminous efficacy of 200 lm/w, which is the highest of any lamp. The theoretical-maximum efficacy at that wavelength is 525 lm/w, so the lamp has a luminous efficiency of 38.1%. Because the lamp is monochromatic, the luminous efficiency nearly matches the wall-plug efficiency of < 40%.

Calculations for luminous efficiency become more complex for lamps that produce white light or a mixture of spectral lines. Fluorescent lamps have higher wall-plug efficiencies than low-pressure sodium lamps, but only have half the luminous efficacy of ~ 100 lm/w, thus the luminous efficiency of fluorescents is lower than sodium lamps. A xenon flashtube has a typical wall-plug efficiency of 50–70%, exceeding that of most other forms of lighting. Because the flashtube emits large amounts of infrared and ultraviolet radiation, only a portion of the output energy is used by the eye. The luminous efficacy is therefore typically around 50 lm/w. However, not all applications for lighting involve the human eye nor are restricted to visible wavelengths. For laser pumping, the efficacy is not related to the human eye so it is not called "luminous" efficacy, but rather simply "efficacy" as it relates to the absorption lines of the laser medium. Krypton flashtubes are often chosen for pumping Nd:YAG lasers, even though their wall-plug efficiency is typically only ~ 40%. Krypton's spectral lines better match the absorption lines of the neodymium-doped crystal, thus the efficacy of krypton for this purpose is much higher than xenon; able to produce up to twice the laser output for the same electrical input. All of these terms refer to the amount of energy and lumens as they exit the light source, disregarding any losses that might occur within the lighting fixture or subsequent output optics. Luminaire efficiency refers to the total lumen-output from the fixture per the lamp output.

With the exception of a few light sources, such as incandescent light bulbs, most light sources have multiple stages of energy conversion between the "wall plug" (electrical input point, which may include batteries, direct wiring, or other sources) and the final light-output, with each stage producing a loss. Low-pressure sodium lamps initially convert the electrical energy using an electrical ballast, to maintain the proper current and voltage, but some energy is lost in the ballast. Similarly, fluorescent lamps also convert the electricity using a ballast (electronic efficiency). The electricity is then converted into light energy by the electrical arc (electrode efficiency and discharge efficiency). The light is then transferred to a fluorescent coating that only absorbs suitable wavelengths, with some losses of those wavelengths due to reflection off and transmission through the coating (transfer efficiency). The number of photons absorbed by the coating will not match the number then reemitted as fluorescence (quantum efficiency). Finally, due to the phenomenon of the Stokes shift, the re-emitted photons will have a longer wavelength (thus lower energy) than the absorbed photons (fluorescence efficiency). In very similar fashion, lasers also experience many stages of conversion between the wall plug and the output aperture. The terms "wall-plug efficiency" or "energy conversion efficiency" are therefore used to denote the overall efficiency of the energy-conversion device, deducting the losses from each stage, although this may exclude external components needed to operate some devices, such as coolant pumps.

== Example of energy conversion efficiency ==
Conversion process	Conversion type	Energy efficiency
Electricity generation
Gas turbine	Chemical to electrical	up to 40%
Gas turbine plus steam turbine (combined cycle)	Chemical to thermal+electrical (cogeneration)	up to 63.08% In December 2017, GE claimed >64% in its latest 826 MW 9HA.02 plant, up from 63.7%. They said this was due to advances in additive manufacturing and combustion. Their press release said that they planned to achieve 65% by the early 2020s.
Water turbine	Gravitational to electrical	up to 95% (practically achieved)
Wind turbine	Kinetic to electrical	up to 50% (HAWT in isolation, up to 25–40% HAWTs in close proximity, up to 35–40% VAWT in isolation, up to 41–47% VAWT series-farm. 3128 HAWTs older than 10 years in Denmark showed that half had no decrease, while the other half saw a production decrease of 1.2% per year. Theoretical limit = 16/27= 59%)
Solar cell	Radiative to electrical	6–40% (technology-dependent, 15–20% most often, median degradation for x-Si technologies in the 0.5–0.6%/year range with the mean in the 0.8–0.9%/year range. Hetero-interface technology (HIT) and microcrystalline silicon (μc-Si) technologies, although not as plentiful, exhibit degradation around 1%/year and resemble thin-film products more closely than x-Si. infinite-stack limit: 86.8% concentrated 68.7% unconcentrated)
Fuel cell	Chemical to thermal+electrical (cogeneration)	The energy efficiency of a fuel cell is generally between 40 and 60%; however, if waste heat is captured in a cogeneration scheme, efficiencies of up to 85% can be obtained.
World average fossil fuel electricity generation power plant as of 2008	Chemical to electrical	Gross output 39%, Net output 33%
Electricity storage
Lithium-ion battery	Chemical to electrical/reversible	80–90%
Nickel–metal hydride battery	Chemical to electrical/reversible	66%
Lead-acid battery	Chemical to electrical/reversible	50–95%
Pumped-storage hydroelectricity	gravitational to electrical/reversible	70–85%
Engine/motor
Combustion engine	Chemical to kinetic	10–50%
Electric motor	Electrical to kinetic	70–99.99% (> 200 W); 50–90% (10–200 W); 30–60% (< 10 W)
Turbofan	Chemical to kinetic	20–40%
Natural process
Photosynthesis	Radiative to chemical	0.1% (average) to 2% (best); up to 6% in principle (see main: Photosynthetic efficiency)
Muscle	Chemical to kinetic	14–27%
Appliance
Household refrigerator	Electrical to thermal	low-end systems ~ 20%; high-end systems ~ 40–50%
Incandescent light bulb	Electrical to radiative	~ 80% wall-plug efficiency 0.7–5.1% luminous efficiency
Light-emitting diode (LED)	Electrical to radiative	4.2–53%
Fluorescent lamp	Electrical to radiative	8.0–15.6%, 28%
Low-pressure sodium lamp	Electrical to radiative	15.0–29.0%, 40.5%
Metal-halide lamp	Electrical to radiative	9.5–17.0%, 24%
Switched-mode power supply	Electrical to electrical	currently up to 96% practically
Electric shower	Electrical to thermal	90–95% (multiply by the energy efficiency of electricity generation to compare with other water-heating systems)
Electric heater	Electrical to thermal	~100% (essentially all energy is converted into heat, multiply by the energy efficiency of electricity generation to compare with other heating systems)
Others
Firearm	Chemical to kinetic	~30% (.300 Hawk ammunition)
Electrolysis of water	Electrical to chemical	50–70% (80–94% theoretical maximum)

== See also ==
- Coefficient of performance
- Cost of electricity by source
- Energy efficiency (disambiguation)
- EROEI
- Exergy efficiency
- Figure of merit
- Heat of combustion
- International Electrotechnical Commission
- Moisture removal efficiency
- Perpetual motion
- Solar cell efficiency
