= Humidity indicator card =

Card on which a moisture-sensitive chemical is impregnated

A humidity indicator card (HIC) is a card on which a moisture-sensitive chemical is impregnated such that it will change color when the indicated relative humidity (RH) is exceeded. This has usually been a blotting paper impregnated with cobalt(II) chloride base; Less toxic alternatives include other chemicals such as cobalt-free chloride base and special plastic films.

Humidity indicators are an inexpensive way to indicate or quantify moisture content inside sealed packaging. They are available in many configurations and used in many applications, especially military and semiconductor. The most common humidity indicator cards change color from blue (less than indicated RH level) to pink (greater than indicated RH level).

== History ==
The need for an easily read humidity indicator that could not be damaged by vibration was identified during World War II. Rear Admiral Welford C. Blinn, at that time the Commander of the USS Pope, became concerned about the poor condition of the weapons and ammunition arriving in the Pacific Theater. High humidity in the South Pacific, coupled with poor packaging methods, was causing corrosion and moisture damage. A significant amount of ordnance was arriving in an unstable, and sometimes dangerous, condition. Following the end of the war Rear Admiral Blinn was assigned to Washington, D.C., where he had the use of a research lab. There he developed the concept for the first color change humidity indicator, a simple go/no go method of monitoring humidity.

In the late 1940s, relative humidity in the range of 30-35% was the concern because this is when corrosion can begin. For 50 years, industrial and military applications for color change humidity indicators were the primary market for these products. R. Admiral Blinn founded Humidial Corporation in 1948 Acquired by Süd-Chemie, Inc., in 1989 to commercialize humidity indicators, later acquired by Clariant

In the mid-1980s descendants of R. Admiral Blinn began working with manufacturers of semiconductors to identify and resolve the problem of “pop corning”. It was determined that the solder mounting of semiconductors, also known as devices, onto boards can cause "pop corning" of certain types of surface mount packages if they have been improperly stored or handled. This package delamination occurs as excessive moisture within the package expands as a result of the rapid thermal changes experienced during solder mount operations. As a result, an industry wide standard for packaging of semiconductors was released in 1989. This standard, EIA 583, called for the use of humidity indicator card that would indicate as low as 10%. Adherence to proper storage and handling methods immediately reduced the number of failures in the semiconductors, but over the years it became apparent that even humidity levels under 10% were detrimental to the devices. Once again, the Joint Electron Device Engineering Council (JEDEC), now the standards body for semiconductor packaging, went to the descendants of R. Admiral Blinn to determine the feasibility of making a 5% color change humidity indicator. In April 1999, J-STD-033 was released with a 5, 10, 15% color change indicator card specified.

Humidity indicator cards are also present on many small electronic devices, ranging from cellular phones to laptop computers, for the purpose of alerting the manufacturer that the device has been exposed to high levels of moisture. In many cases this voids or changes the terms of warranty coverage for the device.

The previous United States Military Specification Mil-I-8835A was the governing specification for a humidity indicator card. The humidity indicator card is also specified for use in J-STD-033, which is the standard for handling, packing, shipping and use of moisture/reflow sensitive surface-mount devices. This is a joint standard developed by the Joint Electron Device Engineering Council and IPC and is used in semiconductor packaging.

== Cobalt-free humidity indicator cards ==
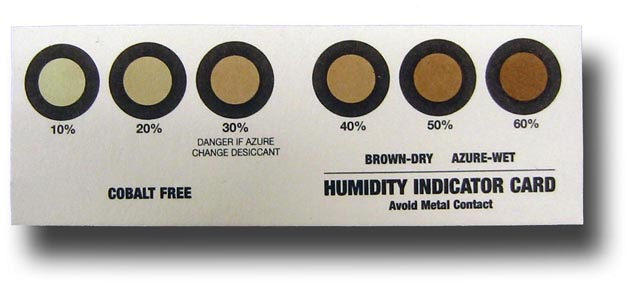
Cobalt Free Humidity Indicator Card

Several cobalt-free systems have been developed. Cobalt-free brown to light blue(copper(II) chloride base) HICs can be found on the market. In 1998, the European Community (EC) issued a directive which classifies items containing cobalt(II) chloride of 0.01 to 1% w/w as T (Toxic), with the corresponding R phrase of R49 (may cause cancer if inhaled). As a consequence, new cobalt-free humidity indicator cards have been developed by some companies.

Although the EC issued this directive, it did not ban humidity indicators that contain cobalt(II) chloride. The only effect the EC directive has on a humidity indicator card that contains cobalt(II) chloride is setting labeling requirement thresholds. There are two ways to consider the EC directive:

1. The cobalt based HIC producers says that if a humidity indicator is considered an article in the EC definition and therefore has no labeling requirements if the content of cobalt(II) chloride by weight is <0.25%. The T (toxic) and R49 (may cause cancer if inhaled) is not applicable because a humidity indicator cannot be inhaled.
2. On the other hand, if you consider HIC as a chemical (indicating spot) on a paper card (indicator) the consequence is that it should be considered as a preparation, the concentration limit changes to 0.01% weight of cobalt(II) chloride, and it should be labeled as T (toxic) and R49 (may cause cancer if inhaled). Moreover, it is clear that the HIC can not be inhaled, but the regulation is about the content of substances and is a warning for users: e.g. if they know that there are harmful substances in the HIC, they will not dispose of them by burning.

== HICs in semiconductor packaging ==
For semiconductor packaging, HICs are packed inside a moisture-sensitive bag, along with the desiccant, to aid in determining the level of moisture to which the moisture-sensitive devices have been subjected. Moisture sensitivity levels are indicated with a number as in the MSL list.

JEDEC is the leading developer of standards for the solid-state industry and sets the standards for semiconductor packaging. The latest JEDEC standard, the Joint Industry Standard for the “Handling, Packing, Shipping and Use of Moisture/Reflow Sensitive Surface Mount Devices” J-STD-033B, sets forth the use and testing of humidity indicator cards in the dry packaging of semiconductors. HICs are used to ensure that the humidity within dry packed barrier bags remains at safe levels for surface mount devices. In the past, HICs for the semiconductor industry have indicated relative humidity (RH) levels of 5, 10 and 15 percent. However, JEDEC and IPC released JSTD-033B in 2005, which requires the use of an HIC that indicates RH levels of 5, 10 and 60 percent.

The standard includes the use and testing of humidity indicator (HI) cards in the dry packaging of semiconductors. The methods outlined in the standard are prescribed by JEDEC and IPC to avoid damage—like cracks and delamination—from moisture absorption and exposure to solder reflow temperatures that can result in yield and reliability degradation.

The stipulations of J-STD-003B state:

1. HICs must adhere to a standard, minimal color-change quality level to ensure accuracy and readability between dry and humid states: The Color Meter Test Method quantitatively determines the accuracy of color-change HICs. The levels, as outlined in the J-STD-033B revision, require a “significant, perceptible change in color” between noted humidity levels. Manufacturers are required to test their cards for accuracy using a colorimeter device and be required to provide a test report to the customer certifying that the HIC meets quality requirements.
2. HICs must indicate humidity levels for MSL 2 Parts, in addition to MSL 2a to 5a: Whereas previous cards used a 5-, 10- and 15-percent relative-humidity spot system to indicate humidity exposure levels for moisture-sensitive components, the new HIC will now feature spots indicating 5, 10 and 60 percent. The change means that cards will now indicate humidity exposure for Level 2 MSL devices. Additionally, a positive reading on the 60-percent spot indicates that cards should not be re-used, as the high levels of humidity to which the card has been exposed will jeopardize the accuracy of low (5% RH) readings. The 5-, 10-, 60-percent cards are complaint with European Community Council Directive 67/548/EEC as long as they do not contain more than the applicable amount of cobalt chloride.

The full standard can be downloaded from JEDEC.

== Irreversible maximum humidity indicator cards ==
Maximum humidity indicator cards are specially designed cards that monitor relative humidity levels in cargo applications. Each level of humidity is represented by a blue crystal that dissolves to create a large blue spot that clearly indicates the highest relative humidity level that has been reached. Maximum humidity indicator cards are irreversible, thus indicating the highest level of humidity experienced by cargo during its voyage, regardless of current (potentially lower) humidity levels. They provide a clear, unmistakable means of determining if goods have been exposed to damaging humidity levels during their journey. If the card indicates high levels of humidity, users know to check their products for possible damage or modify their packaging regimen accordingly. Several technologies are available.

== See also ==
- Time temperature indicator
- Temperature data logger
