= Humidity buffering =

Humidity buffering is the ability of materials to moderate changes in relative humidity by absorbing and desorbing water vapour from surrounding air. This is also referred to as moisture buffering.

The phenomenon has long been exploited for preserving items from damage that could be caused by either excessively moist or dry conditions.

== Examples ==
- Cigars are usually kept in a wooden box called a humidor. A pan of water is placed in the humidor so that the wood will absorb water vapor at close to 100% relative humidity. It is then used to store the cigars at fairly constant relative humidity, between 55 and 70%.
- Silica gel is widely used to buffer relative humidity inside museum display cases, packaged clothing, electronics and anything that might be damaged by condensation, or in the example of museum display cases, being too low an RH (relative humidity) as the silica will help protect the objects displayed from mechanical damage due to shrinking and growing with RH changes.

Recently, there has been an interest in the field of building science and architecture in using humidity buffering as a passive indoor climate control, thus reducing the need for air conditioning and ventilation.

== See also ==
- Desiccant
- Humectant
