= Desiccant =

Substance used to induce or sustain dryness

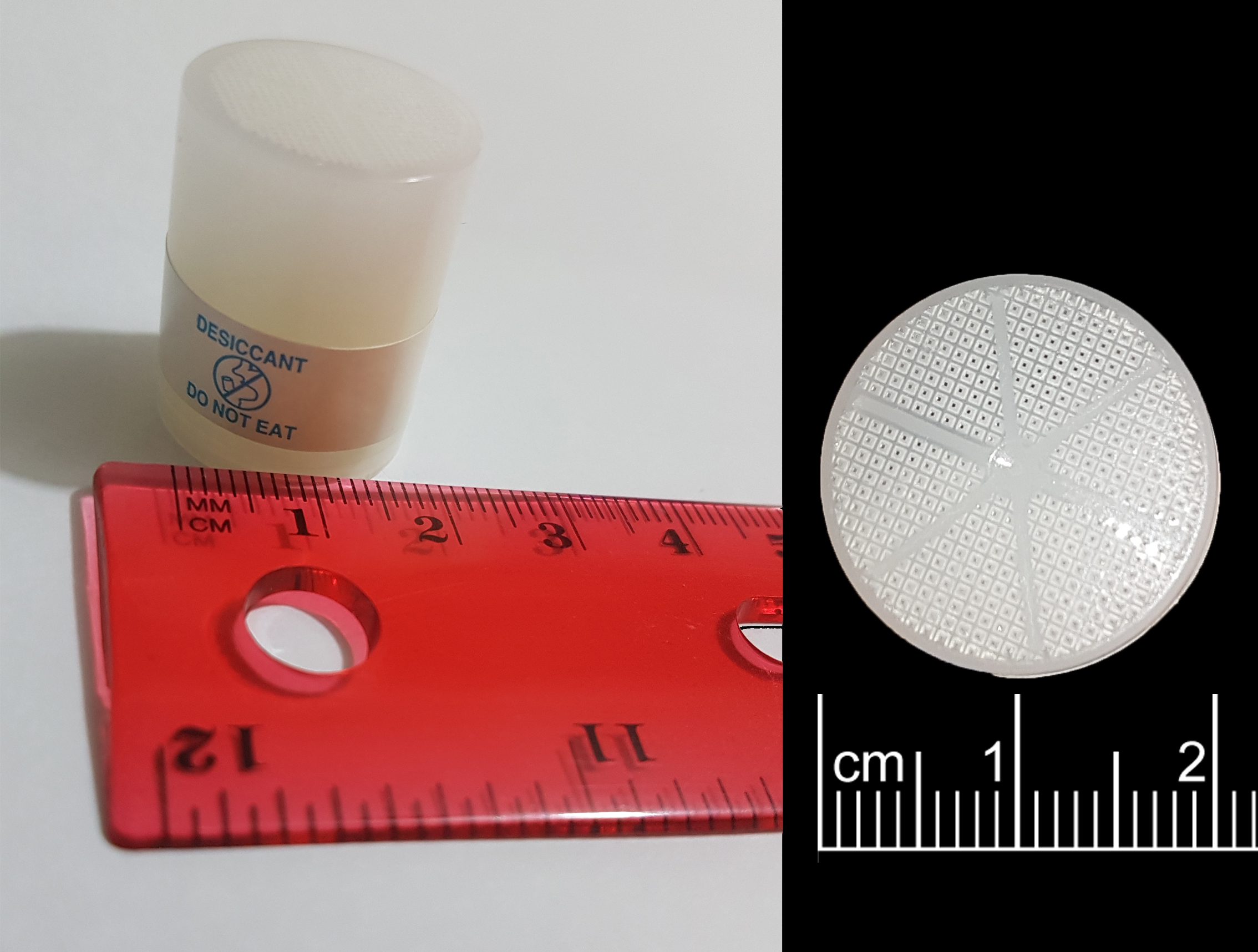
Canisters are commonly filled with silica gel and other molecular sieves used as desiccant in drug containers to keep contents dry.

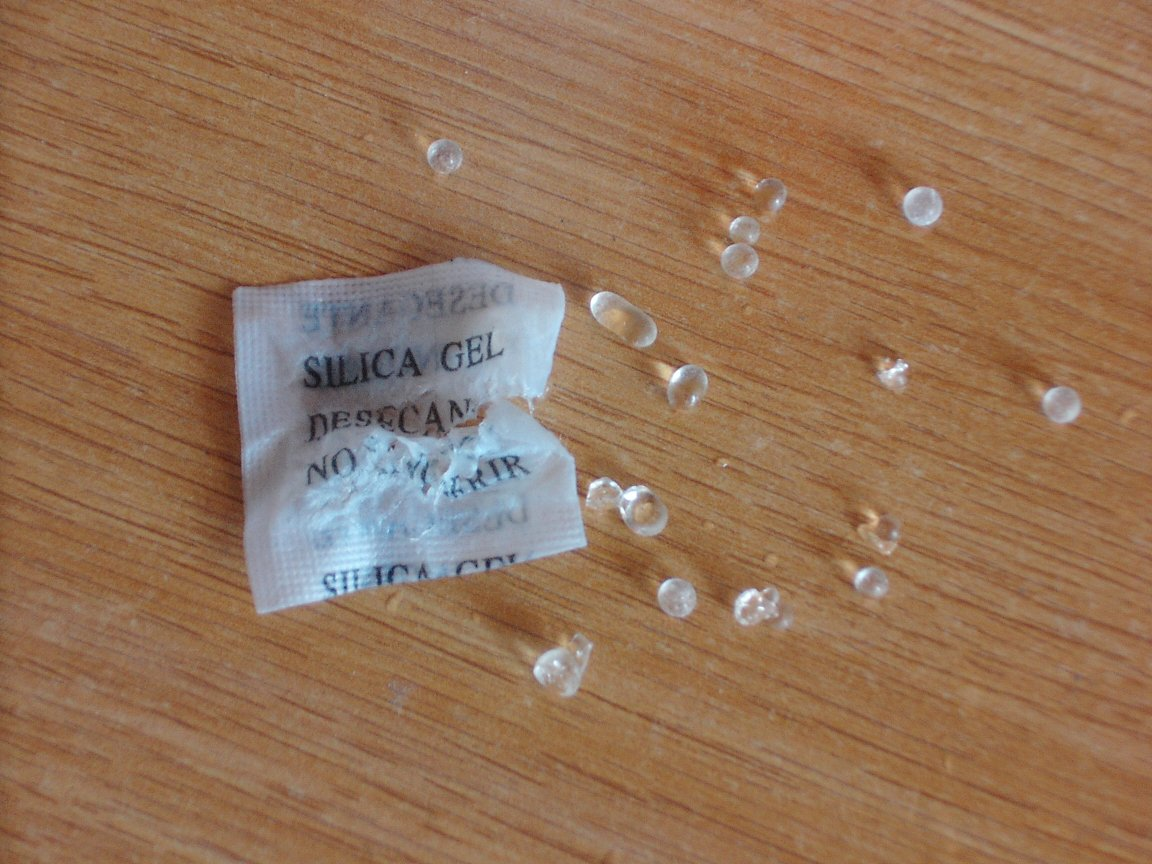
Silica gel in a sachet or porous packet

A desiccant is a hygroscopic substance that is used to induce or sustain a state of dryness (desiccation) in its vicinity; it is the opposite of a humectant. Commonly encountered pre-packaged desiccants are solids that absorb water. Desiccants for specialized purposes may be in forms other than solid, and may work through other principles, such as chemical bonding of water molecules. They are commonly encountered in foods to retain crispness. Industrially, desiccants are widely used to control the level of water in gas streams.

== Types of desiccants ==
Although some desiccants are chemically inert, others are extremely reactive and require specialized handling techniques. The most common desiccant is silica gel, an otherwise inert, nontoxic, water-insoluble white solid. Tens of thousands of tons are produced annually for this purpose. Other common desiccants include activated charcoal, calcium sulfate, calcium chloride, and molecular sieves (typically, zeolites). Desiccants may also be categorized by their type, either I, II, III, IV, or V. These types are a function of the shape of the desiccant's moisture sorption isotherm.

While most traditional desiccants are solids, liquids also are dehydrating agents. Diethylene glycol is an important industrial desiccant. It absorbs water from natural gas, minimizing the formation of methane hydrates, which can block pipes.

=== Performance efficiency ===
One measure of desiccant efficiency is the ratio (or percentage) of water storable in the desiccant relative to the mass of desiccant. Another measure is the residual relative humidity of the air or other fluid being dried. For drying gases, a desiccant's performance can be precisely described by the dew point of the dried product.

Performance of some desiccants
Desiccant	Dew point (°C)	Comment	regenerable?
CaCl_{2}	-18	granular solid	yes
P_{2}O_{5}	-98	reactive solid	no
KOH	-60 to -73	caustic solid	no
H_{2}SO_{4}	-70	strong acid	with difficulty
diethylene glycol	-15	unreactive liquid	yes

=== Colored saturation indicators ===
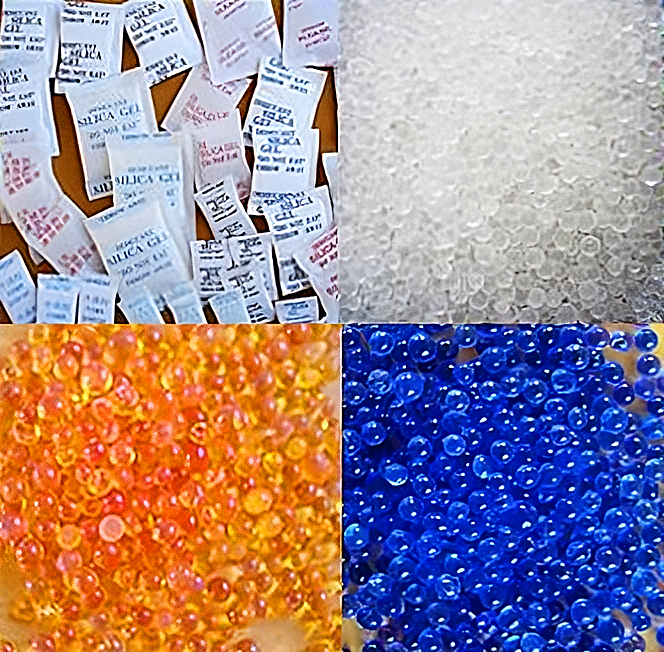
Indicating silica gel

Sometimes a humidity indicator is included in the desiccant to show, by color changes, the degree of water-saturation of the desiccant. One commonly used indicator is cobalt chloride (CoCl_{2}), which is blue when anhydrous, but turns purple upon bonding with two water molecules (CoCl_{2}·2H_{2}O). Further hydration results in the pink hexaaquacobalt(II) chloride complex [Co(H_{2}O)_{6}]Cl_{2}. Blue indicating silica gel (i.e. cobalt chloride based) has been banned in the EU since 1998 due to concerns about the safety of cobalt chloride, which includes being a suspected carcinogen. The alternative is orange indicating silica gel, which is orange when "dry" and turns green when "wet"; it uses methyl violet as the indicator.

== Applications ==
Applications of desiccants are dominated by the petrochemical industry. Hydrocarbons, including natural gas, often must be anhydrous or nearly so for processing or for transport. Catalysts that are used to convert some petroleum fractions are generally deactivated by even traces of water. Natural gas tends to form solid methane hydrates which can block pipes.

=== Domestic uses ===
One example of desiccant usage is in the manufacture of insulated windows where zeolite spheroids fill a rectangular spacer tube at the perimeter of the panes of glass. The desiccant helps to prevent the condensation of moisture between the panes. Another use of zeolites is in the "dryer" component of refrigeration systems to absorb water carried by the refrigerant, whether residual water left over from the construction of the system, or water released by the degradation of other materials over time.

Bagged desiccants are also commonly used to protect goods in barrier-sealed shipping containers against moisture damage: rust, corrosion, etc. Hygroscopic cargo, such as cocoa, coffee, various nuts and grains, and other foods can be particularly susceptible to mold and rot when exposed to condensation and humidity. Because of this, shippers often take measures by deploying desiccants to protect against loss. Pharmaceutical packaging often includes small packets of desiccant to keep the atmosphere inside the package below critical levels of water vapor.

Air conditioning systems can be based on desiccants, as drier air feels more comfortable and absorbing water itself removes heat.

Desiccants are used in livestock farming, where, for example, new-born piglets are highly susceptible to hypothermia owing to their wetness.

=== Laboratory uses ===
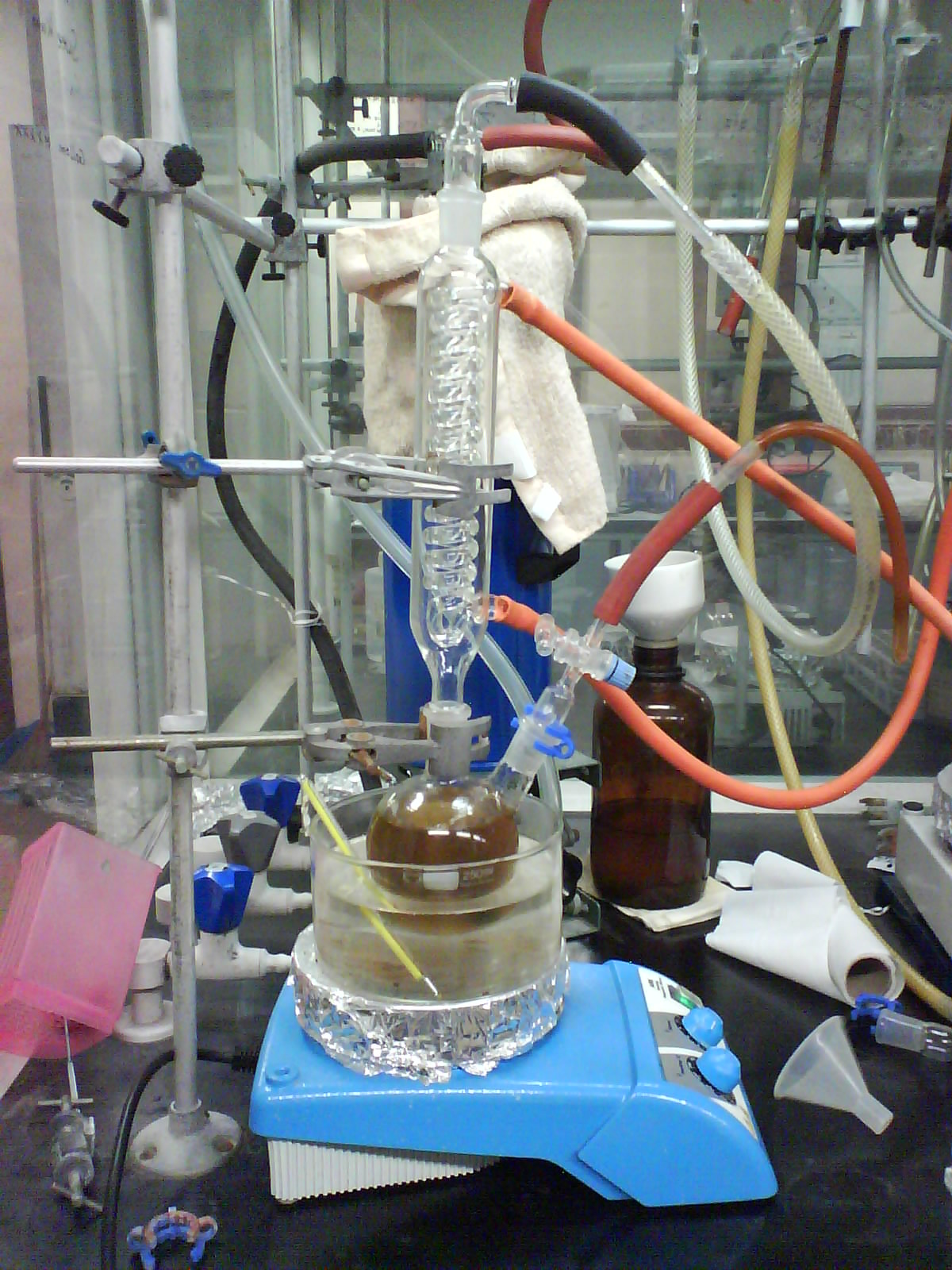
Toluene is heated under reflux with sodium and benzophenone to produce dry, oxygen-free toluene. The toluene is dry and oxygen free when the intense blue coloration from the benzophenone ketyl radical is observed.

Desiccants are also used to remove water from solvents. Drying generally involves mixing the solvent with the solid desiccant. Molecular sieves are superior as desiccants relative to chemical drying reagents such as sodium-benzophenone. Sieves offer the advantages of being safe in air and recyclable.

== Research ==
Metal–organic frameworks (MOFs) are potential desiccants. MOF coating (MIL-100(Fe)) is more energy-efficient than silica gel or zeolite for dehumidification.

== See also ==
- Desiccator
- Humidity buffering
- Humidity indicator card
- Moisture sorption isotherm
- Solar air conditioning
- Oxygen scavenger (oxygen absorber)
- Sorbent
- Volatile corrosion inhibitor
- Cromer cycle
