= Silica gel =

Porous form of silicon dioxide

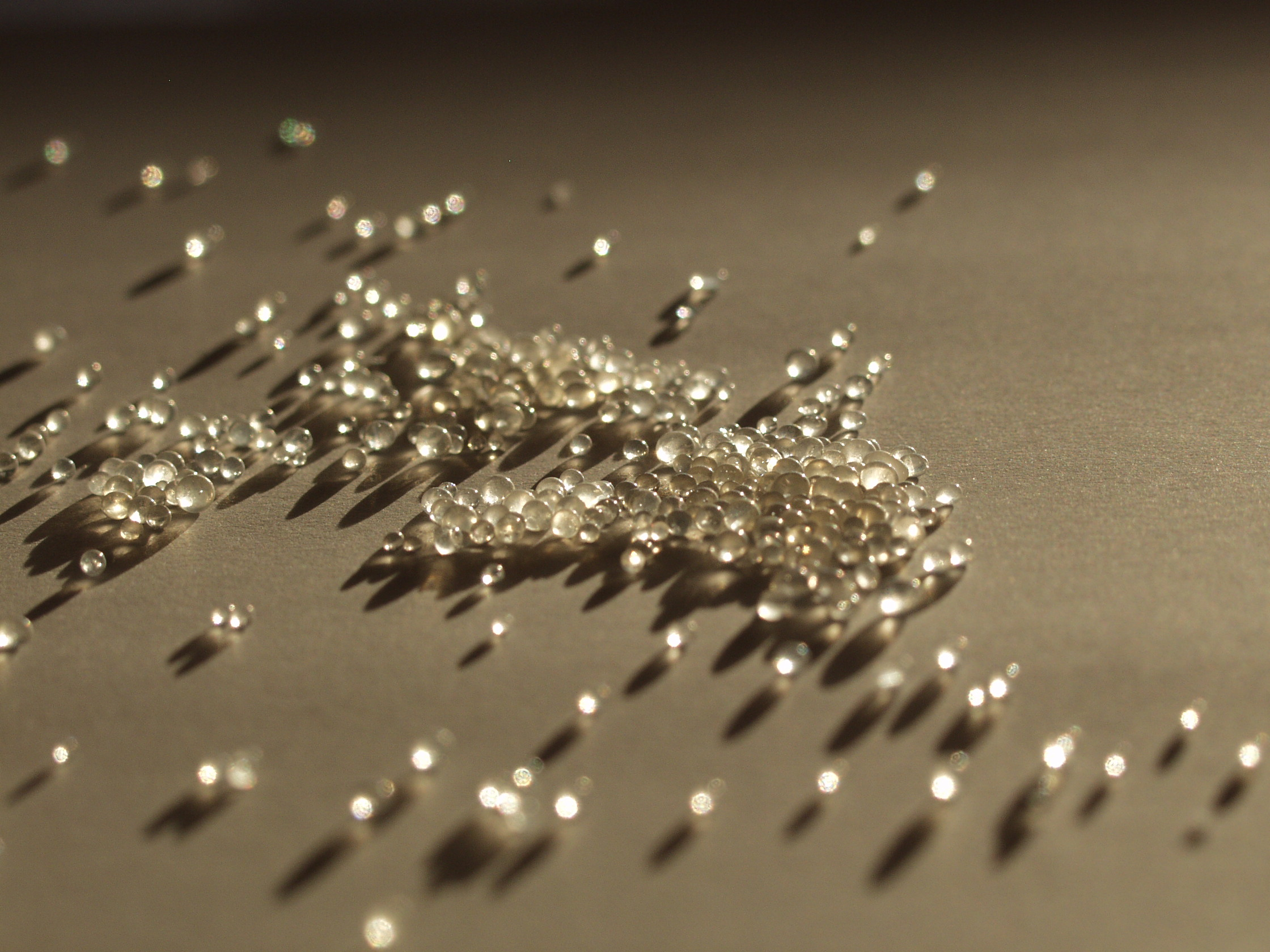

Identifiers
CAS Number	112926-00-8; 1343-98-2 (Silicic acid)
ChemSpider	none
ECHA InfoCard	100.065.880
UNII	Y6O7T4G8P9
CompTox Dashboard (EPA)	DTXSID9029851 DTXSID0051285, DTXSID9029851

Properties
Chemical formula	SiO_{2}
Molar mass	60.08 g/mol
Appearance	Transparent beads
Odor	Odorless
- Except where otherwise noted, data are given for materials in their standard state (at 25 °C [77 °F], 100 kPa). verify (what is ?) Infobox references

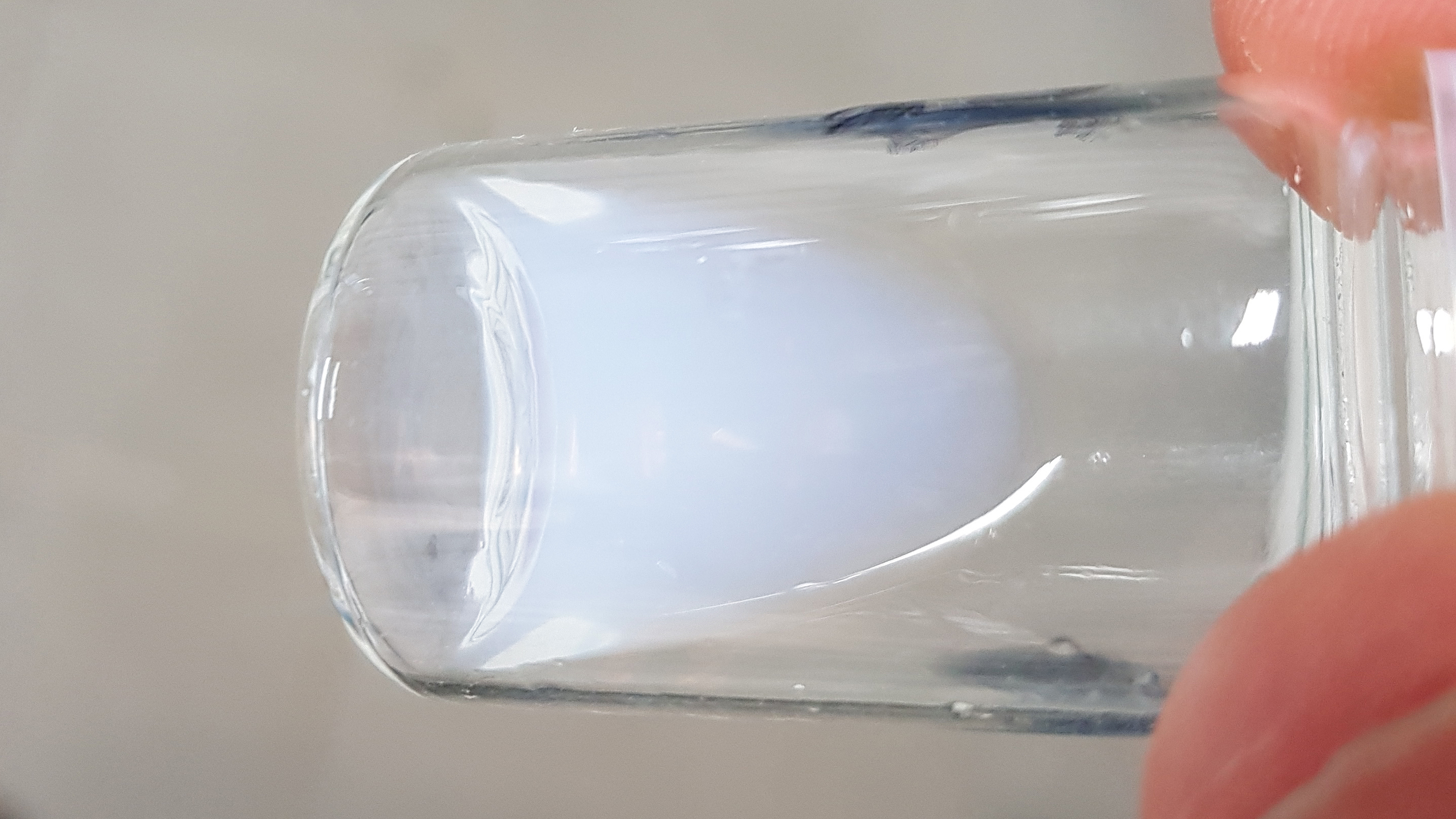
Colloidal silica gel with light opalescence

Silica gel is an amorphous and porous form of silicon dioxide (silica), consisting of an irregular three-dimensional framework of alternating silicon and oxygen atoms with nanometer-scale voids and pores. The voids may contain water or some other liquids, or may be filled by gas or vacuum. In the last case, the material is properly called silica xerogel.

Silica xerogel with an average pore size of 2.4 nanometers has a strong affinity for water molecules and is widely used as a desiccant. It is hard and translucent, but considerably softer than massive silica glass or quartz, and remains hard when saturated with water.

Silica xerogel is usually commercialized as coarse granules or beads, a few millimeters in diameter. Some grains may contain small amounts of indicator substance that changes color when they have absorbed some water. Small paper envelopes containing silica xerogel pellets, usually with a "do not eat" warning, are often included in dry food packages to absorb any humidity that might cause spoilage of the food.

"Wet" silica gel, as may be freshly prepared from alkali silicate solutions, may vary in consistency from a soft transparent gel, similar to gelatin or agar, to a hard solid, namely a water-logged xerogel. It is sometimes used in laboratory processes, for example to suppress convection in liquids or prevent settling of suspended particles.

== History ==
Silica gel was in existence as early as the 1640s as a scientific curiosity. It was used in World War I for the adsorption of vapors and gases in gas mask canisters. The synthetic route for producing silica gel was patented in 1918 by Walter A. Patrick, a chemistry professor at Johns Hopkins University.

== Types ==
- Type A – clear pellets, approximate pore diameter: 2.5 nm, drying and moistureproof properties, can be used as catalyst carriers, adsorbents, separators and variable-pressure adsorbent.
- Type B – translucent white pellets, pore diameter: 4.5–7.0 nm, liquid adsorbents, drier and perfume carriers, also may be used as catalyst carriers, cat litter.
- Type C – translucent, micro-pored structure, raw material for preparation of silica gel cat litter. Additionally dried and screened, it forms macro-pored silica gel which is used as drier, adsorbent and catalyst carrier.

Silica alumina gel – light yellow, chemically stable, flame-resistant, insoluble except in alkali or hydrofluoric acid. Superficial polarity, thermal stability, performance greater than fine-pored silica gel.

Stabilizing silica gel – non-crystalline micro-porous solid powder, nontoxic, flame-resisting, used in brewery of grains for beer to improve taste, clearness, color, and foam and for removal of non-micro-organism impurities.

== Properties ==
Silica gel's high specific surface area – around 750–800 m^{2}/g (230,000–240,000 sq ft/oz) – allows it to absorb water readily, making it useful as a desiccant (drying agent). Silica gel is often described as "absorbing" moisture, which may be appropriate when the gel's microscopic structure is ignored, as in silica gel packs or other products. However, material silica gel removes moisture by adsorption onto the surface of its numerous pores rather than by absorption into the bulk of the gel.

Silica gel is able to absorb up to 37% of its own weight in moisture in high-humidity environments. This moisture can be released upon heating at about 120 °C (250 °F) for 1–2 hours. This makes it reusable multiple times with very little, if any, loss of efficiency.

== Preparation ==
An aqueous solution of sodium silicate is acidified to produce a gelatinous precipitate that is washed, then dehydrated to produce colorless silica gel. When a visible indication of the moisture content of the silica gel is required, ammonium tetrachlorocobaltate(II) (NH_{4})_{2}[CoCl_{4}] or cobalt(II) chloride CoCl_{2} is added. This will cause the gel to be blue when dry and pink when hydrated. Due to a link between the cobalt chloride and cancer, it has been forbidden in Europe for use in silica gel. An alternative indicator is methyl violet, which is orange when dry and green when hydrated.

== Uses ==
=== Desiccant ===
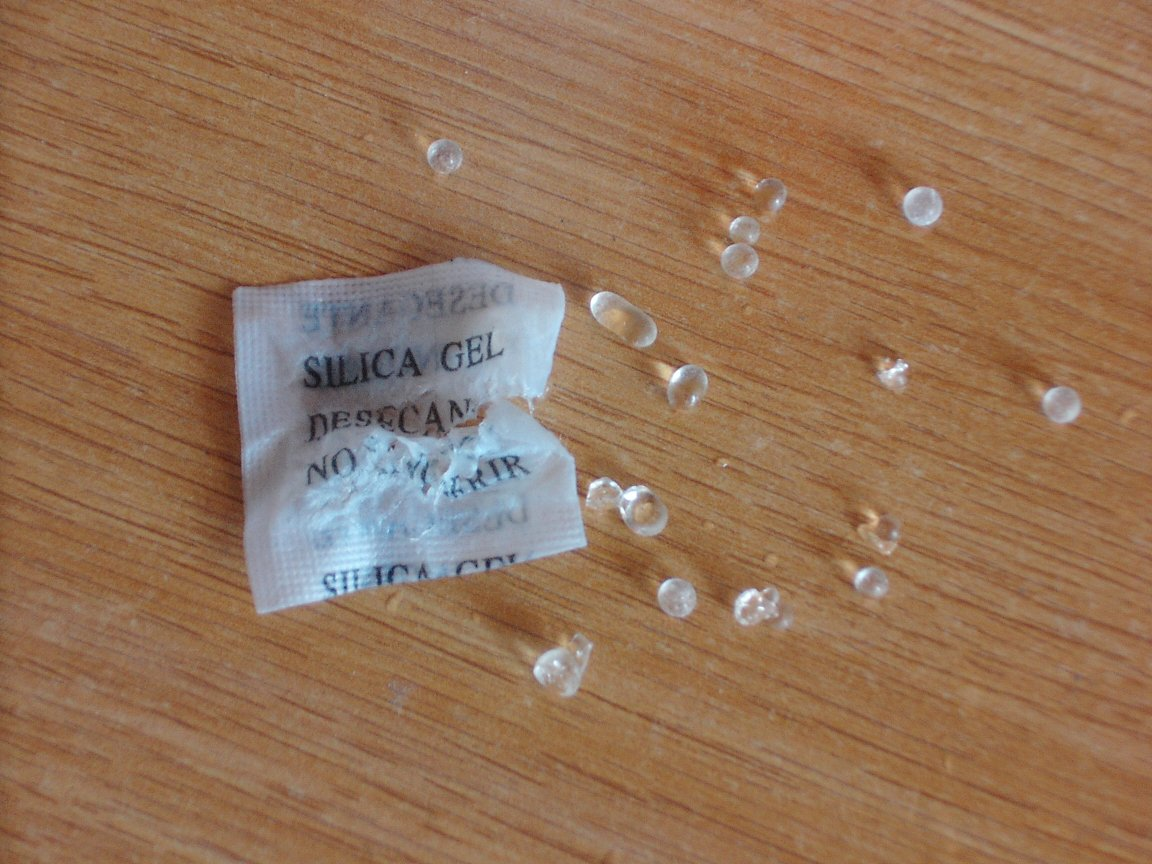
Silica gel, as beads packed in a permeable bag, is a commonly used desiccant.

==== Initial use ====
Moisture can cause mold and spoilage in many items. It can also damage electronics by causing condensation and shorten the lifespan of chemicals, like those in vitamins. Silica gel packets help by absorbing moisture and extending the life of these items.

Silica gel may also be used to keep the relative humidity inside a high frequency radio or satellite transmission system waveguide as low as possible (see also humidity buffering). Excessive moisture buildup within a waveguide can cause arcing inside the waveguide itself, damaging the power amplifier feeding it. Also, the beads of water that form and condense inside the waveguide change the characteristic impedance and frequency, degrading the signal. It is common for a small compressed air system (similar to a small home aquarium pump) to be employed to circulate the air inside the waveguide over a jar of silica gel.

Silica gel is also used to dry the air in industrial compressed air systems. Air from the compressor discharge flows through a bed of silica gel beads. The silica gel adsorbs moisture from the air, preventing damage at the point of use of the compressed air due to condensation or moisture. The same system is used to dry the compressed air on railway locomotives, where condensation and ice in the brake air pipes can lead to brake failure.

Prior to widespread use of air-conditioning, salt shakers with caps containing silica gel beads to keep the salt dry enough to prevent clumping were marketed in the US, replacing the practice of including a few grains of rice in salt shakers to effect the same drying.

Silica gel is sometimes used as a preservation tool to control relative humidity in museum and library exhibitions and storage.

Other applications include diagnostic test strips, inhalation devices, syringes, drug test kits, and hospital sanitation kits.

Silica gel is commonly described as a way to remove moisture from phones and electronics accidentally exposed to water, but there are no known controlled studies that compare its actual efficacy compared to simple air or fan exposure. The average person is also unlikely to have a sufficient quantity of ready-to-use activated or regenerated silica gel.

==== Regeneration ====
Once saturated with water, the gel may be regenerated by heating it to about 120 °C (250 °F) for 1–2 hours. Some types of silica gel will "pop" when exposed to enough water. This is caused by breakage of the silica spheres when contacting the water.

Regenerating silica gel is important for both economic and environmental reasons. It can be regenerated thermally or chemically. Chemical methods involve the use of desiccating agents or solvents to desorb water from silica gel, though these are generally less practical for routine regeneration. Thermal regeneration can be applied also to packed silica gel beds without opening them, and can be done by conventional heating in an oven at a temperature around 120 °C (250 °F). Another option for thermal regeneration is by using microwaves to apply heat more evenly and reduce regeneration time compared to conventional ovens, but this process should be tightly controlled to avoid overheating. Yet another option to apply heat is using a solar heater with a compound parabolic concentrator. There are also studies on using ultrasonic waves to remove water molecules from silica gel at 45 to 90 °C (110 to 190 °F) which are lower temperatures than that of conventional heating.

=== Chemistry ===
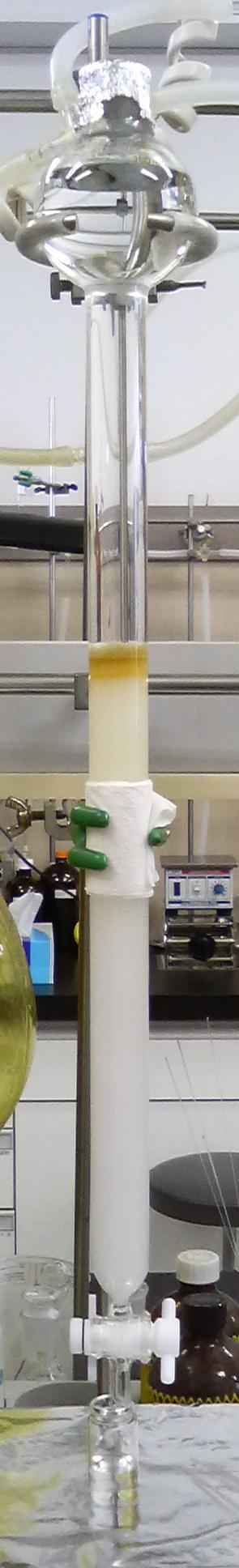
Chromatography column

In chemistry, silica gel is used in chromatography as a stationary phase. In column chromatography, the stationary phase is most often composed of silica gel particles of 40–63 μm. Different particle sizes are used for different kinds of column chromatography as the particle size is related to surface area. The differences in particle size dictate if the silica gel should be used for flash or gravity chromatography. In this application, due to silica gel's polarity, non-polar components tend to elute before more polar ones, hence the name normal phase chromatography. However, when hydrophobic groups (such as C_{18} groups) are attached to the silica gel then polar components elute first and the method is referred to as reverse phase chromatography. Silica gel is also applied to aluminium, glass, or plastic sheets for thin layer chromatography.

The hydroxy (OH) groups on the surface of silica can be functionalized to afford specialty silica gels that exhibit unique stationary phase parameters. These so-called functionalized silica gels are also used in organic synthesis and purification as insoluble reagents and scavengers.

Chelating groups have also been covalently bound to silica gel. These materials have the ability to remove metal ions selectively from aqueous solutions. Chelating groups can be covalently bound to polyamines that have been grafted onto a silica gel surface producing a material of greater mechanical integrity. Silica gel is also combined with alkali metals to form a M-SG reducing agent. (See SiGNa chemistry)

Silica gel is not expected to biodegrade in either water or soil.

=== Cat litter ===
Silica gel is also used as cat litter, by itself or in combination with more traditional materials, such as clays including bentonite. It is non-tracking and virtually odorless.

=== Food additive ===
Silica gel, also referred to as silicon dioxide or synthetic amorphous silica (SAS), is listed by the FDA in the United States as generally recognized as safe (GRAS), meaning it can be added to food products without needing approval. Silica is allowed to be added to food in the US at up to 2% as permitted under 21 CFR 172.480. In the EU, it can be in up to 5% concentrations. In 2018, a re-evaluation by the EFSA Panel on Food Additives and Nutrient Sources added to Food found no indications of toxicity even at the highest estimates of exposure level.

Listed uses include: anticaking agent, defoaming agent, stabilizer, adsorbent, carrier, conditioning agent, chill proofing agent, filter aid, emulsifying agent, viscosity control agent, and anti-settling agent. Silica can be found commonly in foods including baked goods, spices and herbs, dairy products, cocoa products, and more.

=== Water filtration ===
Given the water adsorption properties of silica gel, it is used in domestic water filters. The surface structure of silica gel allows the adsorption of some minerals that are dissolved in the water, or "ion exchange" as it is marketed. Due to the lack of regulations for domestic water filtration products, no studies validate the manufacturer claims regarding the effectiveness of the filtration system.

=== Humidity indicator (color-changing silica gel) ===
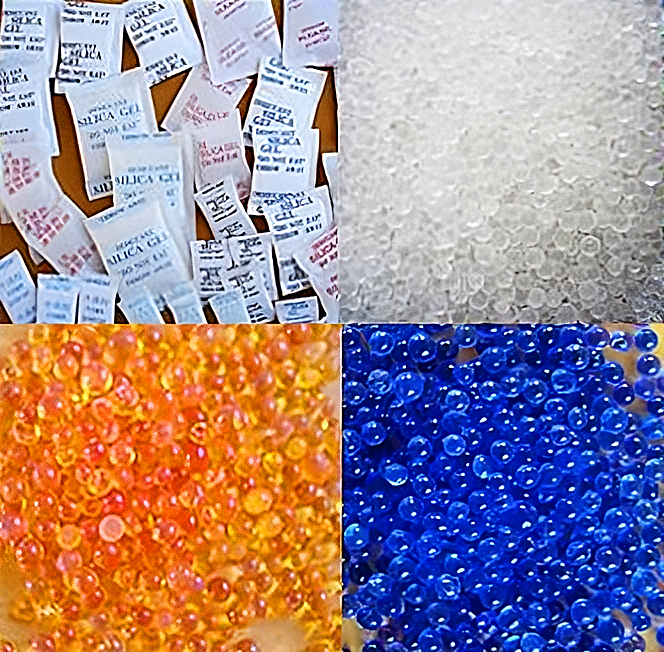
Indicating silica gel

Silica gel may be doped with a moisture indicator that gradually changes its color when it transitions from the anhydrous (dry) state to the hydrated (wet) state. Common indicators are cobalt(II) chloride and methyl violet. Cobalt (II) chloride is deep blue when dry and pink when wet, but it is toxic and carcinogenic, and was reclassified by the European Union in July 2000 as a toxic material. Methyl violet may be formulated to change from orange to green, or orange to colorless. It also is toxic and potentially carcinogenic, but is safe enough to have medicinal uses. Ferric and ferrous salts, sometimes combined with small amounts of sodium hydroxide, provide a better alternative. In particular, ferric sulfate and double salts like ammonium iron(III) sulfate (iron alum), ammonium iron(II) sulfate, and potassium iron(III) sulfate all result in a color change from amber/yellow when dry to colorless/white when saturated.

== Hazards ==
Silica gel is non-toxic, and non-reactive and stable with ordinary usage. It will react with hydrogen fluoride, fluorine, oxygen difluoride, chlorine trifluoride, strong acids, strong bases, and oxidizers. Silica gel is irritating to the respiratory tract and may cause irritation of the digestive tract. Dust from the beads may cause irritation to the skin and eyes, so precautions should be taken. Crystalline silica dust can cause silicosis, but synthetic amorphous silica gel is indurated, so it does not cause silicosis. Additional hazards may occur when doped with a humidity indicator.
