= Cobalt(III) nitrate =

Names
- IUPAC name Cobalt(III) nitrate

Identifiers
CAS Number	15520-84-0
3D model (JSmol)	Interactive image
ChemSpider	9869156
ECHA InfoCard	100.290.572
PubChem CID	11694431
CompTox Dashboard (EPA)	DTXSID20941087
- InChI: InChI=1S/Co.3NO3/c;3*2-1(3)4/q+3;3*-1 Key: JGDIMKGYTAZXOY-UHFFFAOYSA-N; InChI=1/Co.3NO3/c;3*2-1(3)4/q+3;3*-1 Key: JGDIMKGYTAZXOY-UHFFFAOYAI
- SMILES: [Co+3].O=[N+]([O-])[O-].[O-][N+]([O-])=O.[O-][N+]([O-])=O

Properties
Chemical formula	Co(NO_{3})_{3}
Molar mass	244.96 g/mol
Appearance	green crystals hygroscopic
Density	2.49 g/cm^{3}
Solubility in water	5.07 g/100 mL

Structure
Crystal structure	cubic

Related compounds
Other anions	Cobalt(III) fluoride; Cobalt(III) chloride; Cobalt(III) hydroxide
Other cations	Iron(III) nitrate
- Except where otherwise noted, data are given for materials in their standard state (at 25 °C [77 °F], 100 kPa). Infobox references

Cobalt(III) nitrate is an inorganic compound with the chemical formula Co(NO_{3})_{3}. It is a green, diamagnetic solid that sublimes at ambient temperature.

== Structure ==
The compound is a molecular coordination complex. The three bidentate nitrate ligands give a distorted octahedral arrangement. The nitrate ligands are planar. With D_{3} symmetry, the molecule is chiral. The Co-O bond lengths are about 190 pm long. The O-Co-O angles for the chelating oxygen atoms in the same nitrate anion is about 68 degrees. The same geometry seems to persist in carbon tetrachloride solution.

== Preparation and reactions ==
Cobalt(III) nitrate can be prepared by the reaction of dinitrogen pentoxide N_{2}O_{5} with cobalt(III) fluoride CoF_{3}. It can be purified by vacuum sublimation at 40 °C.

Cobalt(III) nitrate oxidizes water, the initial green solution rapidly turns pink, with formation of cobalt(II) ions and release of oxygen. Cobalt(III) nitrate can be intercalated in graphite, in the ratio of 1 molecule for each 12 carbon atoms.
