= Desiccator =

Sealable enclosures containing desiccants to preserve moisture-sensitive items

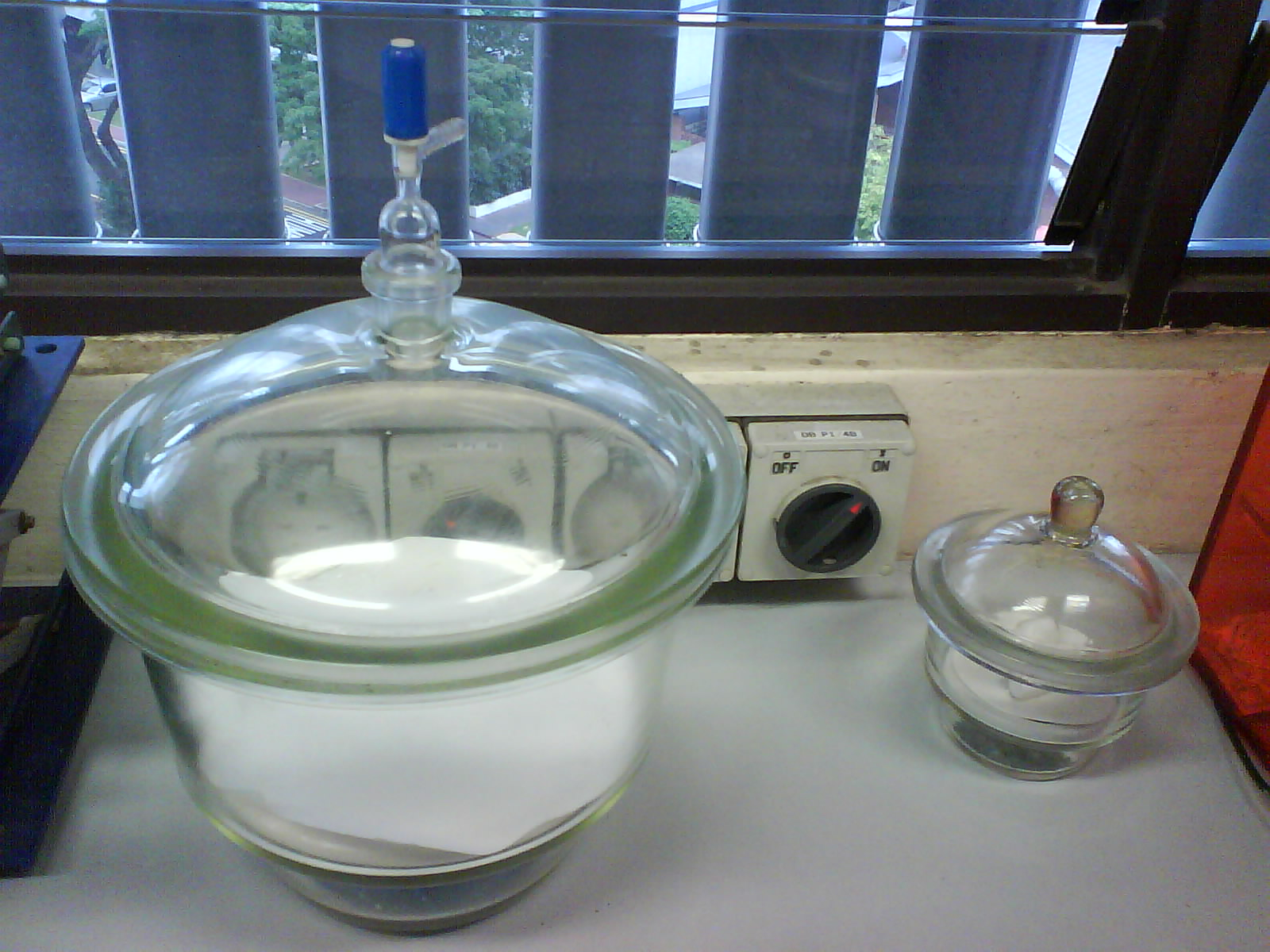
A vacuum desiccator (left - note the stopcock which allows a vacuum to be applied), and a desiccator (right). The blue silica gel in the space below the platform is used as the desiccant.

Desiccators are sealable enclosures containing desiccants used for preserving moisture-sensitive items such as cobalt chloride paper for another use. A common use for desiccators is to protect chemicals which are hygroscopic or which react with water from humidity.

The contents of desiccators are exposed to atmospheric moisture whenever the desiccators are opened. It also requires some time to achieve a low humidity. Hence they are not appropriate for storing chemicals which react quickly or violently with atmospheric moisture such as the alkali metals; a glovebox or Schlenk-type apparatus may be more suitable for these purposes.

Desiccators are sometimes used to remove traces of water from an almost-dry sample. Where a desiccator alone is unsatisfactory, the sample may be dried at elevated temperature using Abderhalden's drying pistol.

In addition to laboratory applications, desiccators are used to protect moisture-sensitive materials and electronic components by maintaining a low-humidity storage environment.

== Constituents ==
The lower compartment of the desiccator contains lumps of silica gel, freshly calcined quicklime, Drierite, molecular sieves, phosphorus pentoxide, (not as effective) anhydrous calcium chloride, or other desiccant to absorb water vapor. The substance needing desiccation is put in the upper compartment, usually on a glazed, perforated ceramic plate. The ground-glass rim of the desiccator lid must be greased with a thin layer of vacuum grease, petroleum jelly or other lubricant to ensure an airtight seal.

In order to prevent damage to a desiccator the lid should be carefully slid on and off instead of being directly placed onto the base.

== Operation ==
In laboratory use, the most common desiccators are circular and made of heavy glass. There is usually a removable platform on which the items to be stored are placed. The desiccant, usually an otherwise-inert solid such as silica gel, fills the space under the platform. Colour changing silica may be used to indicate when it should be refreshed. Indication gels typically change from blue to pink (if the indicator is cobalt(II) chloride) as they absorb moisture but other colours may be used.

A stopcock may be included to permit the desiccator to be evacuated. Such models are usually known as vacuum desiccators. When a vacuum is to be applied, it is a common practice to criss-cross the vacuum desiccator with tape, or to place it behind a screen to minimize damage or injury caused by an implosion. To maintain a good seal, vacuum grease is usually applied to the flanges.

== See also ==
- Bell jar
- Desiccation
- Dry box
