= Cobalt(III) fluoride =

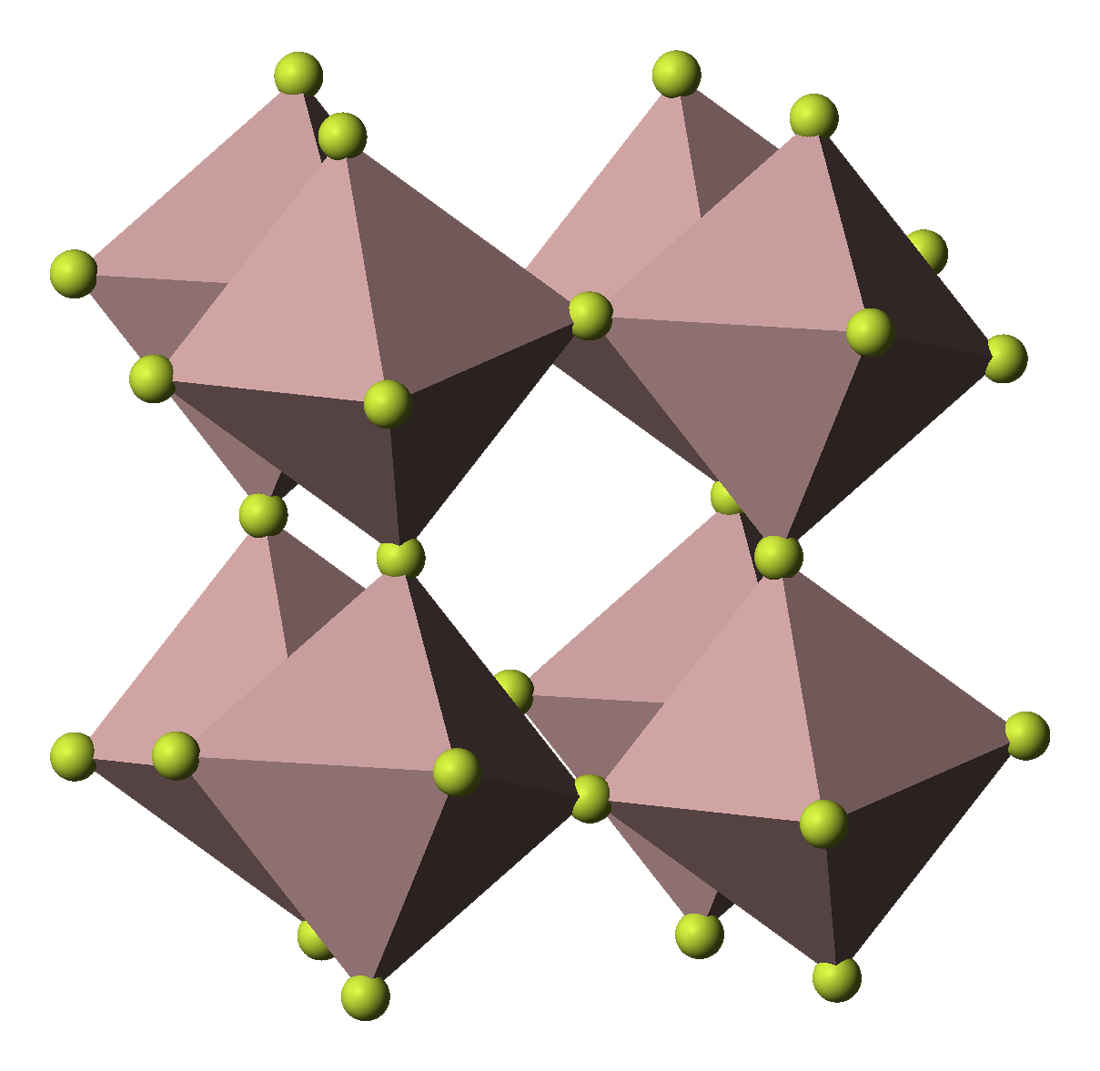
- Cobalt(III) fluoride

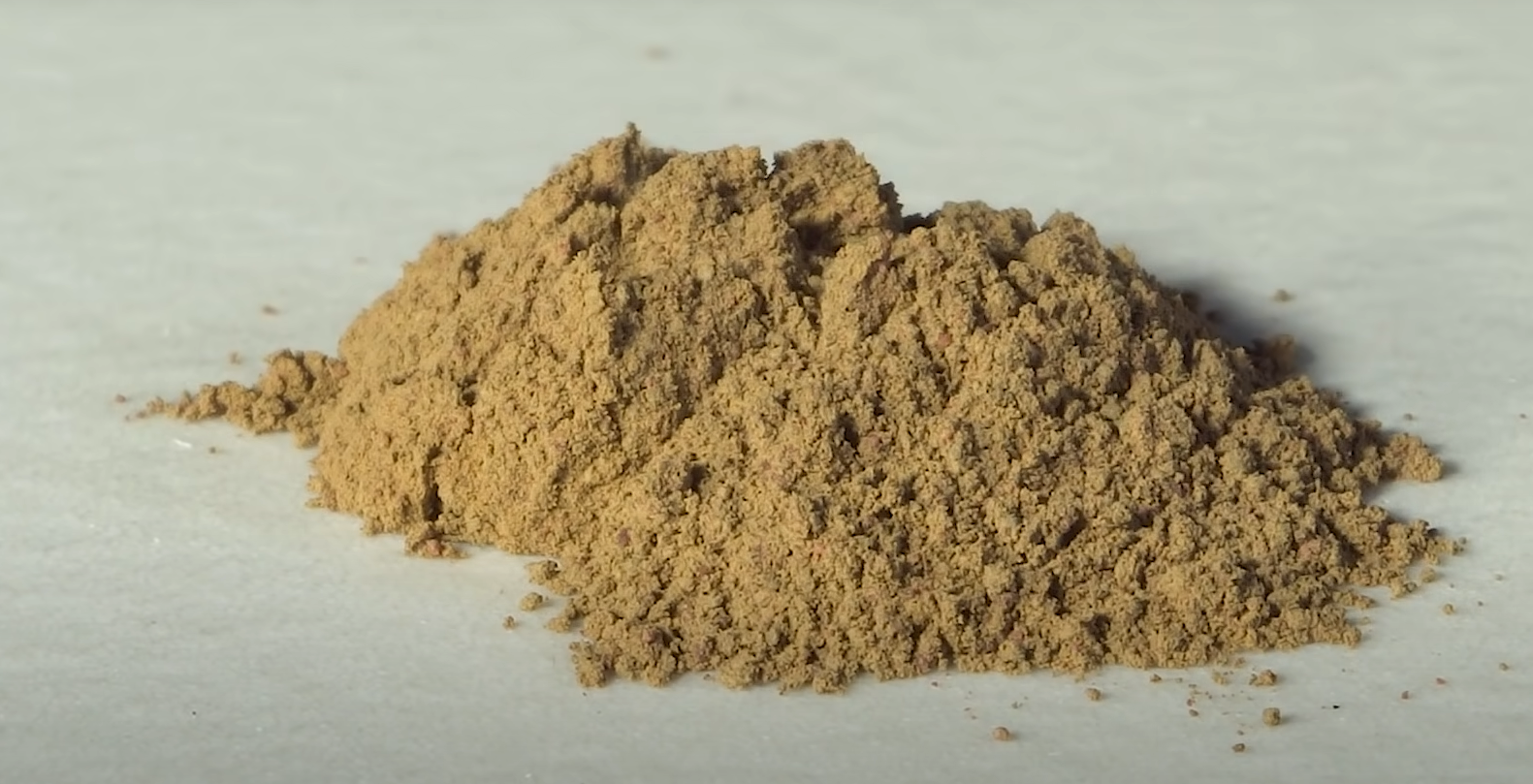

Names
- Other names Cobalt trifluoride Cobaltic fluoride Cobalt fluoride Cobaltic trifluoride

Identifiers
| CAS Number | 10026-18-3; 54496-71-8 dihydrate |
| 3D model (JSmol) | Interactive image |
| ChemSpider | 59593 |
| ECHA InfoCard | 100.030.045 |
| EC Number | 233-062-4 |
| PubChem CID | 66208 |
| UNII | O3R680UKNX |
| CompTox Dashboard (EPA) | DTXSID1064908 |
- InChI: InChI=1S/Co.3FH/h;3*1H/q+3;;;/p-3 Key: WZJQNLGQTOCWDS-UHFFFAOYSA-K; InChI=1/Co.3FH/h;3*1H/q+3;;;/p-3 Key: WZJQNLGQTOCWDS-DFZHHIFOAL
- SMILES: F[Co](F)F

Properties
| Chemical formula | CoF_{3} |
| Molar mass | 115.928 g/mol |
| Appearance | brown powder |
| Density | 3.88 g/cm^{3} |
| Melting point | 927 °C (1,701 °F; 1,200 K) |
| Solubility in water | reacts |
| Magnetic susceptibility (χ) | +1900.0·10^{−6} cm^{3}/mol |

Structure
| Crystal structure | hexagonal |

Hazards
- GHS labelling
| Pictograms | (GHS05: Corrosive) (GHS06: Toxic) (GHS07: Exclamation mark) |
| Signal word | Danger |
| Hazard statements | H301, H314, H317 |
| Precautionary statements | P260, P264, P270, P272, P280, P301+P316, P301+P330+P331, P302+P352, P302+P361+P354, P304+P340, P305+P354+P338, P316, P321, P330, P333+P317, P362+P364, P363, P405, P501 |
| NFPA 704 (fire diamond) | 3 0 2 |

Related compounds
| Other anions | cobalt(III) oxide, cobalt(III) chloride |
| Other cations | iron(III) fluoride, rhodium(III) fluoride |
| Related compounds | cobalt(II) fluoride |
- Except where otherwise noted, data are given for materials in their standard state (at 25 °C [77 °F], 100 kPa). verify (what is ?) Infobox references

Cobalt(III) fluoride (also known as cobalt trifluoride) is the inorganic compound with the formula CoF_{3}. The compound exists in both hydrated and anhydrous forms, the latter being a hygroscopic brown solid. It is used as a fluorinating agent in organofluorine synthesis.

The related cobalt(III) chloride is also known but is extremely unstable. Cobalt(III) bromide and cobalt(III) iodide have not been synthesized.

== Structure ==
=== Anhydrous ===
Anhydrous cobalt trifluoride crystallizes in the rhombohedral group, specifically according to the aluminium trifluoride motif, with a = 527.9 pm and α = 56.97°. Each cobalt centre is bound to six fluorine atoms in octahedral geometry, with Co–F distances of 189 pm. Each fluoride is a doubly bridging ligand.

=== Hydrates ===
A hydrate CoF_{3}·3.5H_{2}O is known, which is conjectured to be better described as [CoF_{3}(H_{2}O)_{3}]·0.5H_{2}O.

There is a report of a hydrate CoF_{3}·3.5H_{2}O, isomorphic to AlF_{3}·3H_{2}O.

== Preparation ==
Cobalt trifluoride can be prepared in the laboratory by treating cobalt(II) chloride (CoCl_{2}) with fluorine gas at 250 °C:

2 CoCl_{2} + 3 F_{2} → 2 CoF_{3} + 2 Cl_{2}

In this redox reaction, the reduction of fluorine to fluoride ions drives the oxidation of both cobalt(II) cations and chloride anions to cobalt(III) ions and chlorine gas, respectively. Treatment of cobalt(II) chloride with chlorine trifluoride (ClF_{3}) or bromine trifluoride (BrF_{3}) also yield cobalt trifluoride, as does the direct fluoridation of cobalt(II) oxide or cobalt(II) fluoride:

2 CoF_{2} + F_{2} → 2 CoF_{3}

The other stable oxide of cobalt, cobalt(II,III) oxide (Co_{3}O_{4}), can be sequentially treated with hydrogen fluoride and then fluorine to produce first cobalt(II) fluoride and cobalt oxyfluoride and then cobalt(III) fluoride, with the overall stoichiometry:

Co_{3}O_{4} + 4 HF → CoF_{2} + 2 CoOF + 2 H_{2}O
2CoF_{2} + 4 CoOF + 5 F_{2} → 6 CoF_{3} + 2 O_{2}

This process reduces the need for expensive and difficult-to-handle fluorine gas.

== Reactions ==
CoF_{3} decomposes upon contact with water to give oxygen:

4 CoF_{3} + 2 H_{2}O → 4 HF + 4 CoF_{2} + O_{2}

It reacts with fluoride salts to give the hexafluorocobaltate(III) anion (CoF^{3−}_{6}), which features a high-spin, octahedral cobalt(III) center.

== Applications ==
Synthesis of organofluorine compounds can be undertaken by direct reaction with fluorine, but this approach can result in fragmentation of the target hydrocarbon. CoF_{3} is an alternative fluorinating agent that is still powerful, but milder than direct fluorination with fluorine. Used as slurry, CoF_{3} converts hydrocarbons to the perfluorocarbons:

2 CoF_{3} + R-H → 2 CoF_{2} + R-F + HF

CoF_{2} is the byproduct.

A study of cobalt trifluoride fluorination of butane showed that a mixture of more than 51 polyfluorinated and perfluorinated butanes, as well as some substituted methylpropanes, were formed. Fluorination of cyclopentane similarly yielded a mix of products with between five (C_{5}H_{5}F_{5}) and ten fluorine substitutions (C_{5}F_{10}). Formation of large numbers of products with low selectivity greatly limits the synthetic utility of cobalt trifluoride fluorination. The related reagent potassium tetrafluorocobaltate(III) (KCoF_{4}) is a more selective alternative.

== Gaseous CoF_{3} ==
In the gas phase, CoF_{3} is calculated to be planar in its ground state, and has a 3-fold rotation axis (point group D_{3h}). The Co^{3+} ion has a ground state of 3d^{6} ^{5}D. The fluoride ligands split this state into, in energy order, ^{5}A', ^{5}E", and ^{5}E' states. The first energy difference is small and the ^{5}E" state is subject to the Jahn-Teller effect, so this effect needs to be considered to be sure of the ground state. The energy lowering is small and does not change the energy order. This calculation was the first treatment of the Jahn-Teller effect using calculated energy surfaces.
