= Cobalt chloride =

Cobalt chloride (cobalt paper) may refer to:

- Cobalt(II) chloride (CoCl_{2})
- Cobalt(III) chloride (CoCl_{3})
