= Cobalt(II) fluoride =

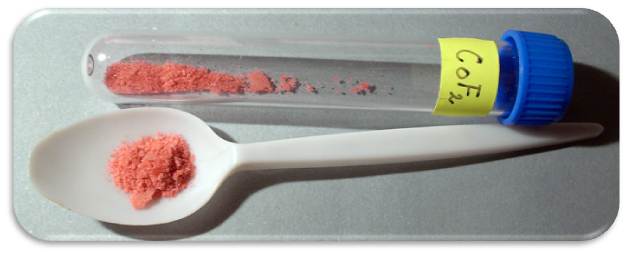

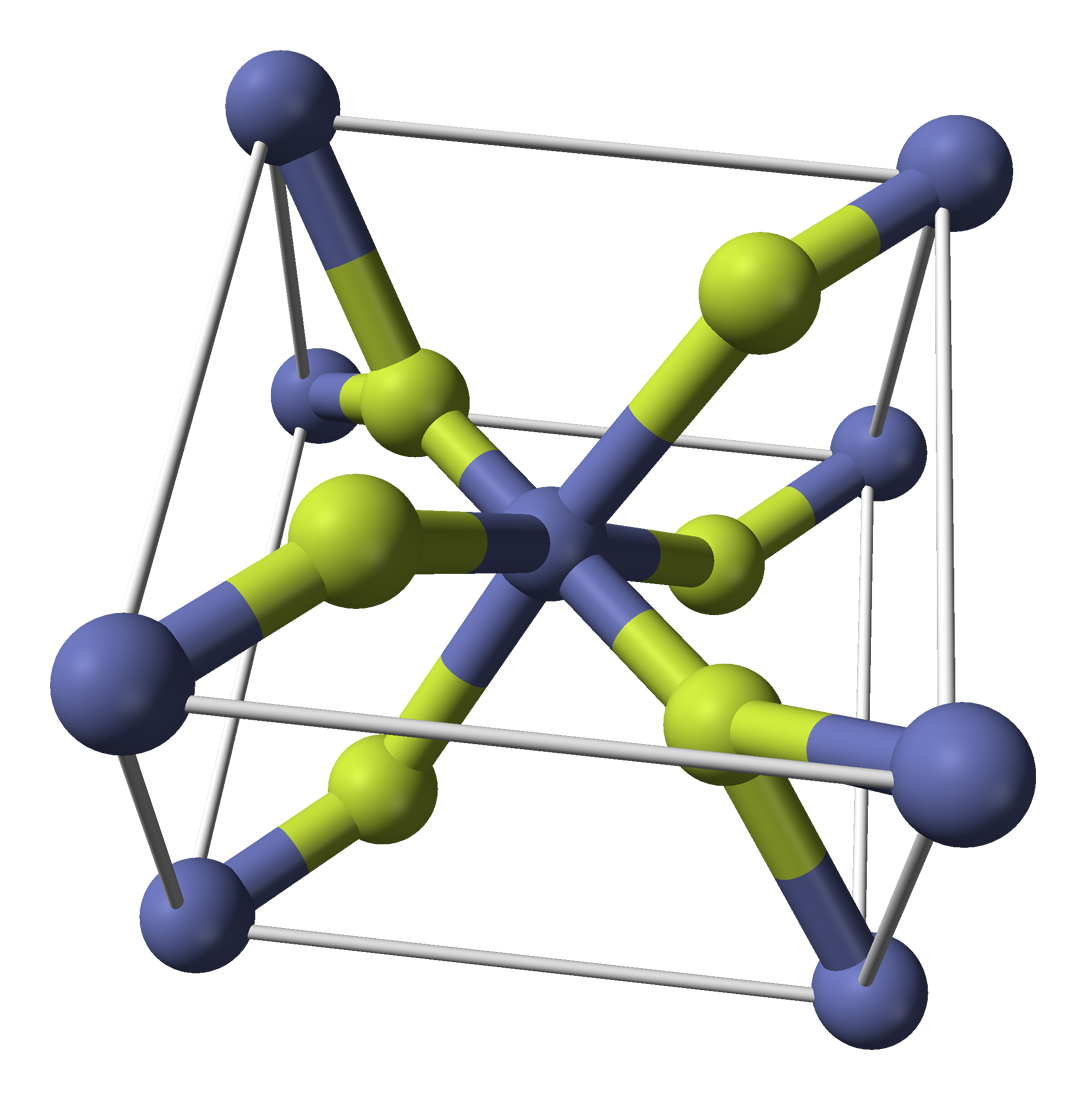

Names
- IUPAC name Cobalt(II) fluoride
- Other names cobalt difluoride

Identifiers
CAS Number	10026-17-2
3D model (JSmol)	Interactive image
ChemSpider	23205
ECHA InfoCard	100.030.044
EC Number	233-061-9
PubChem CID	24820
RTECS number	GG0770000
UNII	9KI67810UR
CompTox Dashboard (EPA)	DTXSID6064907
- InChI: InChI=1S/Co.2FH/h;2*1H/q+2;;/p-2 Key: YCYBZKSMUPTWEE-UHFFFAOYSA-L; InChI=1/Co.2FH/h;2*1H/q+2;;/p-2 Key: YCYBZKSMUPTWEE-NUQVWONBAL
- SMILES: F[Co]F

Properties
Chemical formula	CoF_{2}
Molar mass	96.93 g/mol
Appearance	Red crystalline solid
Density	4.46 g/cm^{3} (anhydrous); 2.22 g/cm^{3} (tetrahydrate)
Melting point	1,217 °C (2,223 °F; 1,490 K)
Boiling point	1,400 °C (2,550 °F; 1,670 K)
Solubility in water	1.4 g/100 mL (25 °C)
Solubility	soluble in HF insoluble in alcohol, ether, benzene
Magnetic susceptibility (χ)	+9490.0·10^{−6} cm^{3}/mol

Structure
Crystal structure	tetragonal (anhydrous) orthorhombic (tetrahydrate)

Hazards
- GHS labelling
Pictograms	(GHS05: Corrosive) (GHS06: Toxic) (GHS07: Exclamation mark) (GHS08: Health hazard)
Signal word	Danger
Hazard statements	H301, H314, H317, H351
Precautionary statements	P203, P260, P264, P270, P272, P280, P301+P316, P301+P330+P331, P302+P352, P302+P361+P354, P304+P340, P305+P354+P338, P316, P318, P321, P330, P333+P317, P362+P364, P363, P405, P501
NFPA 704 (fire diamond)	3 0 0
- Lethal dose or concentration (LD, LC)
LD_{50} (median dose)	oral (rat): 150 mg/kg

Related compounds
Other anions	Cobalt(II) oxide; Cobalt(II) chloride
Other cations	Iron(II) fluoride; Nickel(II) fluoride
Related compounds	Cobalt trifluoride
- Except where otherwise noted, data are given for materials in their standard state (at 25 °C [77 °F], 100 kPa). verify (what is ?) Infobox references

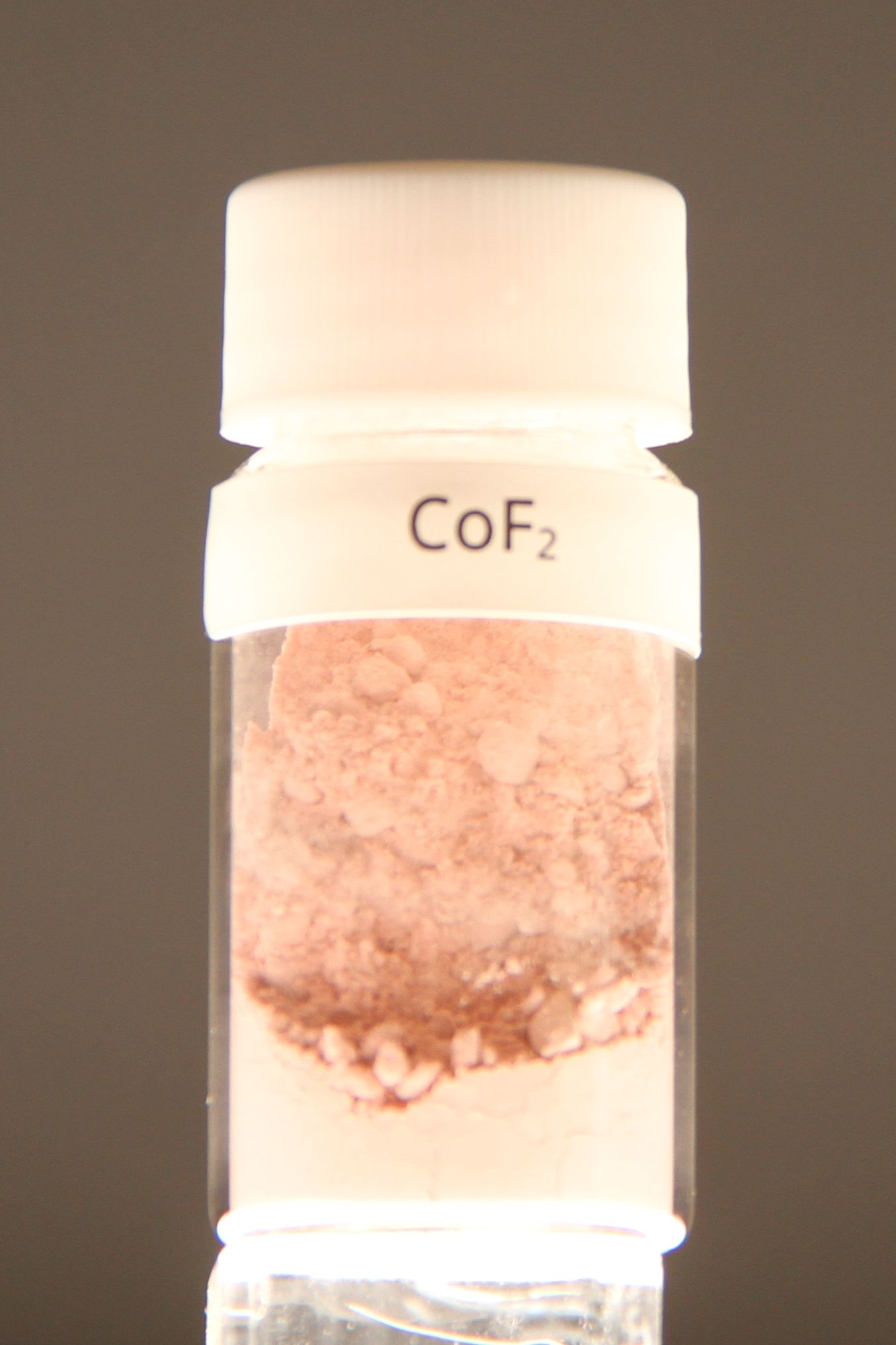
Anhydrous cobalt(II) fluoride

Cobalt(II) fluoride is an inorganic compound with the formula CoF_{2}. It is a pink paramagnetic solid. Like some other metal difluorides, CoF_{2} crystallizes in the rutile structure, which features octahedral Co centers and planar fluorides.

== Preparation ==
Treating anhydrous cobalt chloride with hydrogen fluoride gives cobalt(II) fluoride:

CoCl_{2} + 2 HF → CoF_{2} + 2 HCl

Tetrahydrated cobalt(II) fluoride is formed by dissolving cobalt(II) in hydrofluoric acid. The anhydrous fluoride can be extracted from this by dehydration. Other synthesis can occur at higher temperatures.

== Reactions ==
Cobalt(II) fluoride reacts with fluorine to give cobalt(III) fluoride:

CoF_{2} + 0.5 F_{2} → CoF_{3}

The latter is a catalyst for fluorination reactions.
