= Metal tetranorbornyl =

Class of chemical compounds

In organometallic chemistry, metal tetranorbornyls are compounds with the formula M(nor)_{4} (M = a metal in a +4 oxidation state; nor = bicyclo[2.2.1]hept-1-yl) and are one of the largest series of tetraalkyl complexes derived from identical ligands. Metal tetranorbornyls display uniform stoichiometry, low-spin configurations, and high stability, which can be attributed to their +4 oxidation state metal center. The stability of metal tetranorbornyls is predominately considered to be derived from the unfavorable β-hydride elimination. Computational calculations have determined that London dispersion effects significantly contribute to the stability of metal tetranorbornyls. Specifically, Fe(nor)_{4} has a stabilization of 45.9 kcal/mol^{−1}. Notable metal tetranorbornyls are those synthesized with metal centers of cobalt, manganese, or iron.

== Preparation ==
Traditionally, metal tetranorbornyls are prepared by a reaction of 1-norbornyllithium, with transition-metal halides. Alternative methods have been proposed. Specifically, the tetrakis(1-norbornyl)chromium complex can be prepared in inert atmosphere conditions with 1-norbornyllithium dissolved in hexane.

The tetrakis(1-norbornyl)cobalt(IV) complex can be prepared by the following:

CoCl_{2}·THF + 4 (nor)Li → [pentane] [Co(nor)_{4}] + Co + 4 LiCl + 2 THF

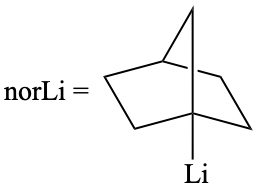
1-norbornyllithium

The tetrakis(1-norbornyl)molybdenum(IV) complex was prepared by the following:

MoCl_{3}(THF)_{3} + 4norLi → [Ether/ THF (_{30}/_{1})] Mo(nor)_{4}

== Structure ==
The stability of metal tetranorbornyls is generally considered to be a result of unfavorable β-hydrogen elimination. Metal alkyl species with β-hydrogen atoms present on the alkyl group are disfavored due to β-hydrogen migration to the metal center, which results in an olefin being eliminated and the production of the corresponding metal hydride. 1-norbornyl does not undergo β-hydrogen migration even though it possesses 6 β-hydrogen atoms due to the unfavorable formation of the olefin, 1-norbornene. According to Bredt's rule, one of the sp^{2} carbons of the double-bonded carbon atoms would be located at the bridgehead, which would cause 1-norbornene to be highly strained. β-hydrogen elimination does not explain the formation of metal tetranorbornyls complexes that are synthesized from lower valent metal center precursors, shortened bond lengths between the metal center and 1-norbornyl ligand carbons, or the resulting low-spin tetrahedral molecular geometry.

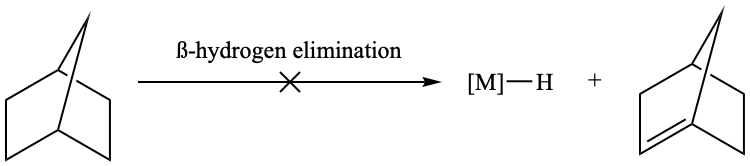
Unfavorable β-hydrogen migration resulting in the formation of 1-norbornene from a 1-norbornyl metal complex

Quantum mechanical calculations have elucidated that London dispersion forces between the norbornyl ligands are accountable for the stability and molecular geometry of the homoleptic tetranorbornyl metal complexes.

Metal tetranorbornyls complexes consisting of the divalent and trivalent metal center species of Cr, Mn, Fe and Co halides undergo formation of negatively charged complexes followed by oxidation that is induced by other transition-metal species in the reaction. Factors that lead to disproportionation are traditionally considered to be derived from the tertiary carbanion ligand, 1-norbornyllithium, and the lack of potential for the pentane solvent to act as a ligand. Therefore, metal tetranorbornyls composed of first-row transition metals are not accessible to be penetrated by small reagents due to the metal center's coordination sphere.

=== Tetrakis(1-norbornyl)cobalt(IV) ===
Tetrakis(1-norbornyl)cobalt(IV) is a thermally stable homoleptic complex observed with σ-bonding ligands. The metal tetranorbornyl complex was the first isolated low-spin complex with tetrahedral molecular geometry. The tetrakis(1-norbornyl)cobalt(IV) complex was first synthesized by Barton K. Bower and Howard G. Tennent in 1972.

The tetrakis(1-norbornyl)cobalt(IV) oxidation state is a reversible reaction using O_{2} as the oxidizing agent. The coordination environment of the cobalt metal center has a distorted tetrahedron structure. When examined by x-ray crystallography, the metal tetranorbornyl has a crystallographic C_{s} symmetry due to the presence of six carbons laid on the mirror plane. However, the four carbons atoms bonded to the cobalt metal center resembled a tetragonally compressed tetrahedron, which appeared as a pseudo D_{2d} symmetry.

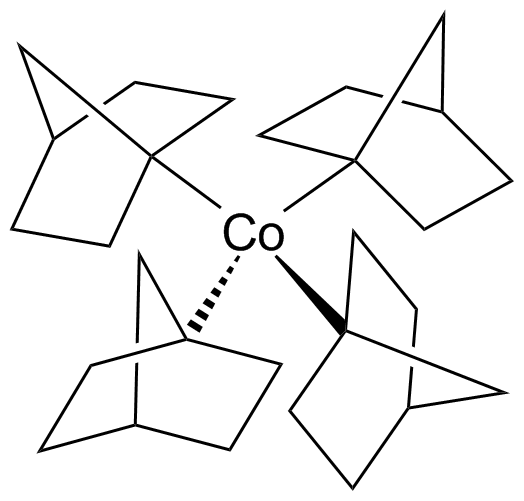
Tetrakis(1-norbornyl)cobalt(IV)

The cobalt metal center in the +4 oxidation state has a d^{5} configuration. Typically, the d^{5} configuration is expected to result in the high spin complex containing 5 unpaired electrons and only 1 unpaired electron in the low spin tetrahedral complex. The single unpaired electron resides in the antibonding t_{2} orbital, which would cause the structure to experience a Jahn-Teller distortion. However, Theopold and co-workers speculated that the slight tetragonal compression could have been a result of steric interactions between norbornyl ligands and crystal packing forces.

=== Tetrakis(1-norbornyl)iron(IV) ===
The tetrakis(1-norbornyl)iron(IV) complex was first synthesized by Barton K. Bower and Howard G. Tennent in 1972. The 1-norbornyl ligands on the complex have a strong dispersion attraction and high ring strain, which as a consequence hinders the α- and β-hydride elimination reactions. Additionally, the identical ligands cause a reduced chemical reactivity due to a crowded chemical environment that impedes the interaction of small molecules with the Fe-C bonds.

=== Synthesized complexes ===
Barton K. Bower and Tennent characterized the following metal tetranorbornyls:

- tetrakis(1-norbornyl)hafnium
- tetrakis(1-norbornyl)zirconium
- tetrakis(1-norbornyl)titanium
- tetrakis(1-norbornyl)vanadium
- tetrakis(1-norbornyl)chromium
- tetrakis(1-norbornyl)manganese
- tetrakis(1-norbornyl)iron
- tetrakis(1-norbornyl)molybdenum

The metal tetranorbornyls complexes of hafnium, zirconium, titanium, and vanadium display a tetrahedral molecular geometry, which is analogous to the tetrachloride form of the metals. In comparison, the cobalt, manganese, and iron complexes display a tetragonal molecular geometry. A combination of London dispersion force and steric effects from the 1-norbornyl ligands results in the stability observed for the metal center.

== Characterization ==
=== Magnetic measurements ===
The resulting molecular geometry of the metal tetranorbornyls complexes is due to the unpaired and paired d electrons. Magnetic measurements have indicated that the d electrons of tetrakis(1-norbornyl)chromium (d^{2}) and tetrakis(1-norbornyl)manganese (d^{3}) are not spin paired. The four d electrons of tetrakis(1-norbornyl)iron and tetrakis(1-norbornyl)cobalt are spin paired.

=== Electron paramagnetic resonance spectroscopy ===
Metal tetranorbornyls are commonly characterized via electron paramagnetic resonance (EPR) spectroscopy. Tetrakis(1-norbornyl)molybdenum was observed as a room temperature EPR signal that originated from a d^{2} metal center, which was considered to have two unpaired electrons in the e_{g} orbital. In addition, the resulting EPR signal of tetrakis(1-norbornyl)chromium was comparable.

=== Cyclic voltammetry ===
Two reversible electron transfer waves at -0.65 and -2.02 V were observed in THF, which elucidated that the difference in peak potentials were consistent with two one-electron transfer processes when being compared to the ferricenium/ ferrocene couple. In the same year, William M. Davis, Richard R. Schrock, and Richard M. Kolodziej produced a cyclic voltammogram for tetrakis(1-norbornyl)molybdenum. Two oxidation waves were observed at -0.15 and +1.25 V in DCM. The oxidation at -0.15 V was considered to be reversible. In comparison, the second oxidation at +1.25 V was considered to be irreversible.
