= Tetrakis(1-norbornyl)cobalt(IV) =

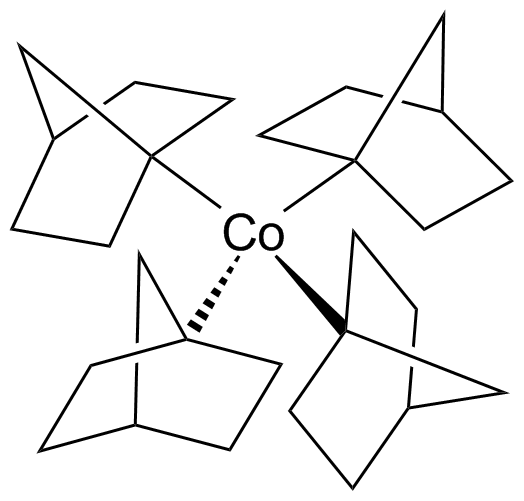

Names
- Other names (T-4)-Tetrakis(bicyclo[2.2.1]hept-1-yl)cobalt

Identifiers
CAS Number	36333-80-9
3D model (JSmol)	Interactive image
- InChI: InChI=1S/4C7H11.Co/c4*1-2-7-4-3-6(1)5-7;/h4*6H,1-5H2; Key: FULAMMPKLQBENQ-UHFFFAOYSA-N
- SMILES: C1CC2CCC1(C2)[Co](C(CC1)2CCC1C2)(C(CC1)2CCC1C2)C(CC1)2CCC1C2

Properties
Chemical formula	C_{28}H_{44}Co
Molar mass	439.593 g·mol^{−1}
Appearance	brown crystals
Melting point	100 °C (decomposes)
Solubility	soluble in THF
- Except where otherwise noted, data are given for materials in their standard state (at 25 °C [77 °F], 100 kPa). Infobox references

Tetrakis(1-norbornyl)cobalt(IV) is an air-sensitive organometallic compound of cobalt. It was first synthesized by Barton K. Bower and Howard G. Tennent in 1972 and is one of few compounds in which cobalt has a formal oxidation state of +4.

== Preparation ==
Tetrakis(1-norbornyl)cobalt(IV) is formed the reaction of CoCl_{2}•THF with 1-norbornyllithium (norLi) in n-pentane under an inert atmosphere. The cobalt(II) chloride-THF adduct is prepared from Soxhlet extraction of anhydrous CoCl_{2} with THF, and the organolithium reagent is prepared from the reaction between 1-chloro-norbornane and lithium metal in a solvent such as pentane:

2 CoCl_{2}•THF + 4 norLi → [Co(nor)_{4}] + Co + 4 LiCl + 2 THF

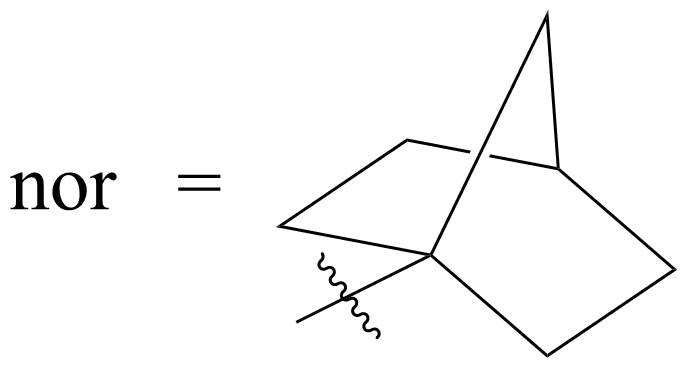

The compound can then be purified by recrystallization.

== Properties ==
The complex is a thermally stable homoleptic tetraorganylcobalt(IV) complex with exclusively σ-bonding ligands. It was the first low-spin complex with tetrahedral geometry to be isolated.

=== Stability ===
The exceptional stability of the complex is in large part due to its inability to undergo either α- or β-hydride elimination. The α-position of the metal (corresponding to the 1-position of the norbornyl ligand) has no more hydrogen atoms, while hydride elimination from the β-position would yield an energetically unfavorable double bond on a bridgehead atom (Bredt's rule). Moreover, the bulky norbornyl ligands sterically shield the central atom, hindering ligand substitutions as well as homolysis.

The rare d^{5} low-spin configuration in a tetrahedral ligand field is possible because the ligand is so strongly σ-donating that the gap between the e und t_{2} orbitals is raised sufficiently to overcome the spin pairing energy. The resulting configuration is e^{4}t_{2}^{1}, with magnetic measurements showing paramagnetism consistent with only one unpaired electron.

=== Cobalt(III) and cobalt(V) derivatives ===
The reaction between CoCl_{2}•THF and 1-norbornyllithium (norLi) also allows the formation of a cobalt(III) complex: if a mixture of diethyl ether and THF is used as the solvent in place of n-pentane, the resulting disproportionation reaction affords the complex tetrakis(1-norbornyl)cobaltate(III), which crystallizes out of solution with solvated lithium counterions, along with elemental cobalt.

$$\ce{3 {CoCl2.THF} + 8 {norLi} + 5 {THF} ->[\ce{Et2O/THF}] 2 {[Li(THF)4][Co(nor)4]} + {Co} + LiCl}$$

The compound is air-sensitive, has a green color and is paramagnetic, with two unpaired electrons, again indicating a low-spin tetrahedral configuration (d^{6}, e^{4}t_{2}^{2}).

The corresponding cobalt(V) complex is prepared by oxidizing tetrakis(1-norbornyl)cobalt(IV) with Ag[BF_{4}] in THF and crystallizes with tetrafluoroborate as the counterion.

Co(nor)_{4} + AgBF_{4} → [Co(nor)_{4}]BF_{4} + Ag

This complex :[Co(nor)_{4}]^{+} is the first cobalt(V) complex to be isolated. Again the configuration is low-spin (d^{4}, e^{4}t_{2}^{0}).

== See also ==
- Metal tetranorbornyl
