= Cobalt(III) chloride =

Names
- IUPAC name Cobalt(III) chloride
- Other names Cobaltic chloride Cobalt trichloride

Identifiers
| CAS Number | 10241-04-0 |
| 3D model (JSmol) | Interactive image |
| ChemSpider | 59676 |
| ECHA InfoCard | 100.030.509 |
| EC Number | 233-574-8 |
| PubChem CID | 66297 |
| CompTox Dashboard (EPA) | DTXSID5065011 |
- InChI: InChI=1S/3ClH.Co/h3*1H;/q;;;+3/p-3 Key: IEKWPPTXWFKANS-UHFFFAOYSA-K
- SMILES: Cl[Co](Cl)Cl

Properties
| Chemical formula | CoCl_{3} |
| Molar mass | 165.2913 g/mol (anhydrous) |
| Melting point | Solid decomposes over −60°C |
| Solubility | soluble in ethanol, diethyl ether |

Hazards
- GHS labelling
| Pictograms | (GHS06: Toxic) |
| Signal word | Danger |
| Hazard statements | H300, H330 |
| Precautionary statements | P260, P264, P270, P271, P284, P301+P310, P304+P340, P310, P320, P321, P330, P403+P233, P405, P501 |
- Except where otherwise noted, data are given for materials in their standard state (at 25 °C [77 °F], 100 kPa). verify (what is ?) Infobox references

Cobalt(III) chloride or cobaltic chloride is an unstable and elusive compound of cobalt and chlorine with the formula CoCl_{3}. In this compound, the cobalt atoms have a formal charge of +3.

The compound has been reported to exist in the gas phase at high temperatures, in equilibrium with cobalt(II) chloride and chlorine gas. It has also been found to be stable at very low temperatures, dispersed in a frozen argon matrix.

Some articles from the 1920s and 1930s claim the synthesis of bulk amounts of this compound in pure form; however, those results do not seem to have been reproduced, or have been attributed to other substances like the hexachlorocobaltate(III) anion CoCl^{3−}_{6}. Those earlier reports claim that it gives green solutions in anhydrous solvents such as ethanol and diethyl ether, and that it is stable only at very low temperatures (below −60 °C).

== Structure and properties ==
The infrared spectrum of the compound in frozen argon indicates that the isolated CoCl_{3} molecule is planar with D_{3h} symmetry.

A scientific study of the stability of this and other metal trihalides at 50 °C was published by Nelsoon and Sharpe in 1956.

Aerodynamic properties for the gas phase have been determined by the Glushko Thermocenter of the Russian Academy of Sciences.

== Preparation ==
Cobalt trichloride was detected in 1952 by Harald Schäfer and Kurt Krehl in the gas phase when cobalt(II) chloride CoCl_{2} is heated in an atmosphere of chlorine Cl_{2}. The trichloride is formed through the equilibrium

2CoCl_{2} + Cl_{2} ↔ 2 CoCl_{3}

At 918 K (below the melting point of CoCl_{2}, 999 K), the trichloride was the predominant cobalt species in the vapor, with partial pressure of 0.72 mm Hg versus 0.62 for the dichloride. However, equilibrium shifts to the left at higher temperatures. At 1073 K, the partial pressures were 7.3 and 31.3 mm Hg, respectively.

Cobalt trichloride, in amounts sufficient to study spectroscopically, was obtained by Green and others in 1983, by sputtering cobalt electrodes with chlorine atoms and trapping the resulting molecules in frozen argon at 14 K.

A report from 1969 claims that treatment of solid cobalt(III) hydroxide CoOOH·H_{2}O with anhydrous ether saturated with HCl at −20 °C produces a green solution (stable at −78 °C) with the characteristic spectrum of CoCl_{3}.

In a 1932 report, the compound was claimed to arise in the electrolysis of cobalt(II) chloride in anhydrous ethanol.

== Related compounds ==
The hexachlorocobaltate(III) anion CoCl^{3−}_{6} has been identified in preparations of cobalt(III) salts and hydrochloric acid HCl in glacial acetic acid.

In solutions of cobalt(III) salts with chloride ions, the anionic complexes (H_{2}O)_{5}Co(Cl)^{2+} and (H_{2}O)_{4}(OH)Co(Cl)^{+} are present.

Trichlorides of cobalt(III) complexed with various ligands, such as organic amines, can be quite stable. In particular, hexamminecobalt(III) chloride Co(NH_{3})_{6}Cl_{3} is the archetypal Werner complex and has uses in biological research. Another classical example is tris(ethylenediamine)cobalt(III) chloride Co(H_{2}N–C_{2}H_{4}–NH_{2})_{3}Cl_{3}.
