= List of desiccants =

List of desiccants:

- Activated alumina
- Aerogel
- Benzophenone (as anion)
- Bentonite clay
- Calcium chloride
- Calcium hydride
- Calcium oxide
- Calcium sulfate (Drierite)
- Cobalt(II) chloride
- Copper(II) sulfate
- Lithium chloride
- Lithium bromide
- Magnesium chloride hexahydrate
- Magnesium sulfate
- Magnesium perchlorate
- Molecular sieve
- Phosphorus pentoxide
- Potassium carbonate
- Potassium hydroxide
- Rice
- Silica gel
- Sodium
- Sodium chlorate
- Sodium chloride
- Sodium hydroxide
- Sodium sulfate
- Sucrose
- Sulfuric acid
- Triethylene glycol
- Zeolite (molecular sieves)
