= Cobalt(III) hydroxide =

Names
- IUPAC name Cobalt(III) hydroxide
- Other names Cobaltic hydroxide

Identifiers
CAS Number	1307-86-4
3D model (JSmol)	Interactive image
ChemSpider	8278661
ECHA InfoCard	100.013.776
EC Number	215-153-0
PubChem CID	10103133
UNII	S42YMM16W7
CompTox Dashboard (EPA)	DTXSID50926862
- InChI: InChI=1S/Co.3H2O/h;3*1H2/q+3;;;/p-3 Key: FXVNMSSSMOVRTC-UHFFFAOYSA-K
- SMILES: [OH-].[OH-].[OH-].[Co+3]

Properties
Chemical formula	Co(OH)_{3}
Molar mass	109.95522 g
Appearance	brown-black or dark green powder

Hazards
- GHS labelling
Pictograms	(GHS07: Exclamation mark) (GHS08: Health hazard)
Signal word	Danger
Hazard statements	H319, H334, H413
Precautionary statements	P261, P264, P273, P280, P285, P304+P341, P305+P351+P338, P337+P313, P342+P311, P501
- Except where otherwise noted, data are given for materials in their standard state (at 25 °C [77 °F], 100 kPa). Infobox references

Cobalt(III) hydroxide or cobaltic hydroxide is a chemical compound with formula Co(OH)_{3} or H_{3}CoO_{3}. It is an ionic compound, with trivalent cobalt cations Co^{3+} and hydroxyl anions OH^{−}.

The compound is known in two structurally different forms, "brownish-black" and "green". The brownish-black form is a stable solid and can be prepared by reaction of water solutions of cobalt(II) chloride and sodium hydroxide, followed by oxidation with ozone.

The green form, formerly thought to be cobalt(II) peroxide, apparently requires carbon dioxide as a catalyst. It can be prepared by adding hydrogen peroxide to a solution of cobalt(II) chloride in 96% ethanol at –30 to –35°C, then adding a 15% solution of sodium carbonate in water with intense stirring. The resulting dark green powder is fairly stable at liquid nitrogen temperature, but at room temperature it turns dark brown within a few days.

== Natural occurrence ==
As of 2020, cobalt(III) hydroxide has not been reported among the known mineral species. However, heterogenite, a mineral that contains CoO(OH) (cobalt(III) oxyhydroxide) or similar mixed-ligand structure, is known.

== See also ==
- Cobalt(II) hydroxide Co(OH)_{2}
