= Cobalt(II) chloride =

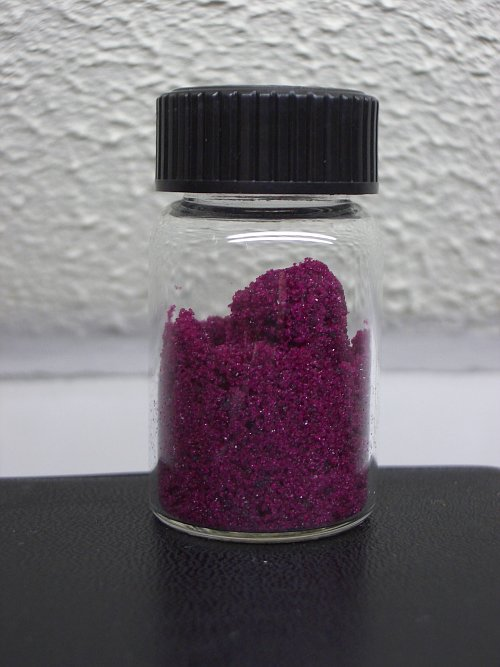
- Hexahydrate

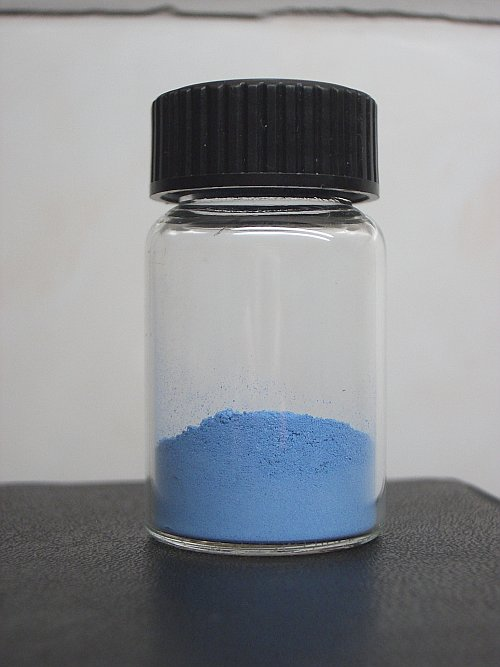
- Anhydrous

Names
- IUPAC name Cobalt(II) chloride
- Other names Cobaltous chloride Cobalt dichloride Muriate of cobalt

Identifiers
CAS Number	7646-79-9; 16544-92-6 (dihydrate); 7791-13-1 (hexahydrate)
3D model (JSmol)	anhydrous: Interactive image; hexahydrate: Interactive image
ChEBI	CHEBI:35696
ChemSpider	22708
ECHA InfoCard	100.028.718
EC Number	231-589-4
PubChem CID	3032536
RTECS number	GF9800000
UNII	EVS87XF13W; 17AVG63ZBC (hexahydrate)
UN number	3288
CompTox Dashboard (EPA)	DTXSID9040180
- InChI: InChI=1S/2ClH.Co/h2*1H;/q;;+2/p-2 Key: GVPFVAHMJGGAJG-UHFFFAOYSA-L; InChI=1/2ClH.Co/h2*1H;/q;;+2/p-2 Key: GVPFVAHMJGGAJG-NUQVWONBAU
- SMILES: anhydrous: Cl[Co]Cl; hexahydrate: Cl[Co-4](Cl)([OH2+])([OH2+])([OH2+])[OH2+].O.O

Properties
Chemical formula	CoCl_{2}
Molar mass	129.839 g/mol (anhydrous); 165.870 g/mol (dihydrate); 237.931 g/mol (hexahydrate)
Appearance	blue crystals (anhydrous) violet-blue (dihydrate) rose red crystals (hexahydrate)
Density	3.356 g/cm^{3} (anhydrous); 2.477 g/cm^{3} (dihydrate); 1.924 g/cm^{3} (hexahydrate)
Melting point	726 °C (1,339 °F; 999 K) ±2 (anhydrous); 140 °C (monohydrate); 100 °C (dihydrate); 86 °C (hexahydrate)
Boiling point	1,049 °C (1,920 °F; 1,322 K)
Solubility in water	43.6 g/100 mL (0 °C); 45 g/100 mL (7 °C); 52.9 g/100 mL (20 °C); 105 g/100 mL (96 °C)
Solubility	38.5 g/100 mL (methanol); 8.6 g/100 mL (acetone) soluble in ethanol, pyridine, glycerol
Magnetic susceptibility (χ)	+12,660·10^{−6} cm^{3}/mol

Structure
Crystal structure	CdCl_{2} structure
Coordination geometry	hexagonal (anhydrous) monoclinic (dihydrate); Octahedral (hexahydrate)

Hazards
- GHS labelling
Pictograms	(GHS06: Toxic) (GHS08: Health hazard) (GHS09: Environmental hazard)
NFPA 704 (fire diamond)	3 0 0
Flash point	Non-flammable
- Lethal dose or concentration (LD, LC)
LD_{50} (median dose)	80 mg/kg (rat, oral)
Safety data sheet (SDS)	ICSC 0783

Related compounds
Other anions	Cobalt(II) fluoride Cobalt(II) bromide Cobalt(II) iodide
Other cations	Rhodium(III) chloride Iridium(III) chloride
- Except where otherwise noted, data are given for materials in their standard state (at 25 °C [77 °F], 100 kPa). verify (what is ?) Infobox references

Cobalt(II) chloride refers to inorganic compounds with the formula CoCl_{2}·(H_{2}O)_{n}. These compounds include anhydrous CoCl2 as well as several hydrates. The anhydrous form is a blue solid; the dihydrate is purple and the hexahydrate is pink. The hexahydrate is commonly used in the laboratory.

== Properties ==
=== Solid forms ===
Anhydrous cobalt chloride has the cadmium chloride structure (CdCl_{2}) (R3̅m) in which the cobalt(II) ions are octahedrally coordinated. At about 706 °C (20 degrees below the melting point), the coordination changes to tetrahedral. The vapor pressure has been reported as 7.6 mmHg at the melting point. The anhydrous salt, which is hygroscopic, sublimes under flowing hydrogen chloride. The dihydrate, CoCl_{2}(H_{2}O)_{2}, is a coordination polymer. Each Co center is coordinated to four doubly bridging chloride ligands. The octahedron is completed by a pair of mutually trans aquo ligands.

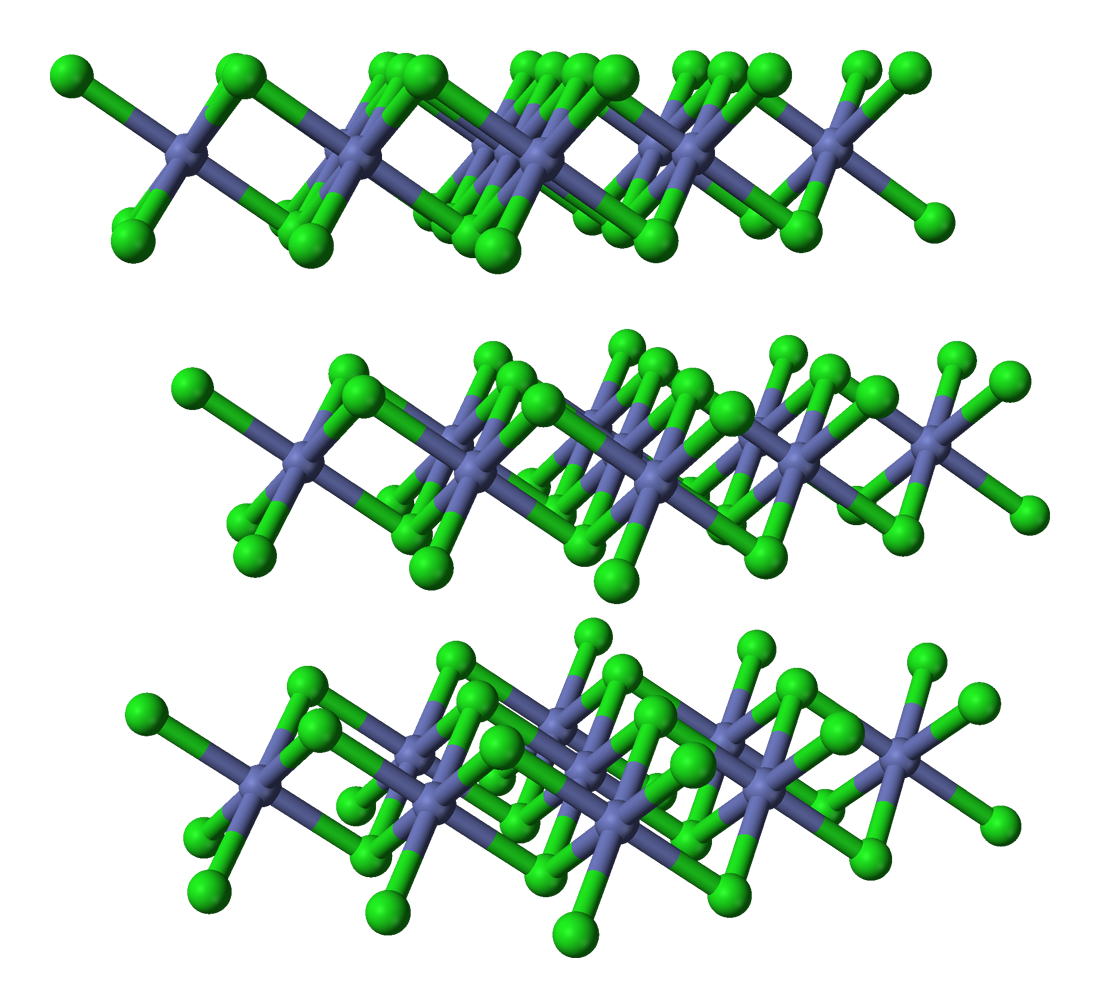
Anhydrous

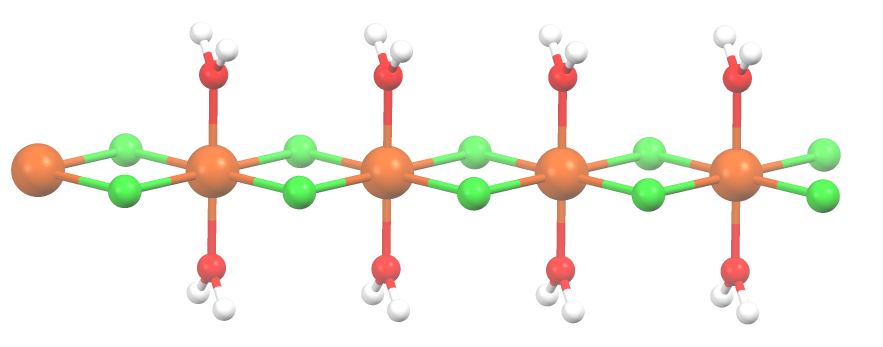
Dihydrate

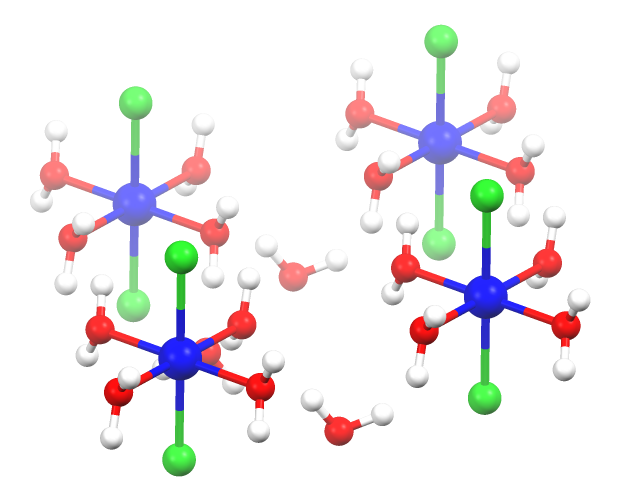
Hexahydrate

Structures of the forms of cobalt(II) chloride

Solid hexahydrate CoCl2•6H_{2}O contains the neutral molecule trans-CoCl_{2}(H_{2}O)_{4} and two molecules of water of crystallization. Claims of the formation of tri- and tetrahydrates have not been confirmed.

=== Solutions ===
Cobalt chloride is fairly soluble in water. Under atmospheric pressure, the mass concentration of a saturated solution of CoCl_{2} in water is about 54% at the boiling point, 120.2 °C; 48% at 51.25 °C; 35% at 25 °C; 33% at 0 °C; and 29% at −27.8 °C.

Diluted aqueous solutions of CoCl_{2} contain the hexaaquo complex [Co(H_{2}O)_{6}]^{2+}. Concentrated solutions are red at room temperature but become blue at higher temperatures.

== Preparation ==
The anhydrous compound can be prepared by heating the hydrated cobalt chlorides under flowing hydrogen chloride or by treating hydrated cobalt(II) acetate with acetyl chloride:

Co(O_{2}CCH_{3})_{2}·(H_{2}O)_{4} + 6 CH_{3}COCl → CoCl_{2} + 6 CH_{3}CO_{2}H + 4 HCl

Aqueous solutions of cobalt chloride can be prepared from cobalt(II) hydroxide or cobalt(II) carbonate and hydrochloric acid according to this idealized equation:

CoCO_{3} + 2 HCl + 3 H_{2}O → CoCl_{2}·(H_{2}O)_{4} + CO_{2}

Cooling saturated aqueous solutions yields the dihydrate between 120.2 °C and 51.25 °C, and the hexahydrate below 51.25 °C. Water ice, rather than cobalt chloride, will crystallize from solutions with concentration below 29%. The monohydrate and the anhydrous forms can be obtained by cooling solutions only under high pressure, above 206 °C and 335 °C, respectively.

On rapid heating or in a closed container, each of the 6-, 2-, and 1- hydrates partially melts into a mixture of the next lower hydrate and a saturated solution—at 51.25 °C, 206 °C, and 335 °C, respectively. On slow heating in an open container, so that the water vapor pressure over the solid is practically zero, water evaporates out of each of the solid 6-, 2-, and 1- hydrates, leaving the next lower hydrate, at about 40°C, 89°C, and 125°C, respectively. If the partial pressure of the water vapor is in equilibrium with the solid, as in a confined but not pressurized container, the decomposition occurs at about 115°C, 145°C, and 195°C, respectively.

Dehydration can also be effected with trimethylsilyl chloride:

CoCl_{2}•6H_{2}O + 12 (CH_{3})_{3}SiCl → CoCl_{2} + 6[(CH_{3})_{3}SiCl]_{2}O + 12 HCl

== Reactions ==
Cobalt(II) chloride is a precursor to many other cobalt compounds. The hexahydrate and the anhydrous salt are weak Lewis acids. The adducts are usually either octahedral or tetrahedral. It forms an octahedral complex with pyridine (C_{5}H_{5}N):

CoCl_{2}·6(H_{2}O) + 4 C_{5}H_{5}N → CoCl_{2}(C_{5}H_{5}N)_{4} + 6 H_{2}O

With triphenylphosphine (P(C_{6}H_{5})_{3}), a tetrahedral complex results:

CoCl_{2}·6(H_{2}O) + 2 P(C_{6}H_{5})_{3} → CoCl_{2}[P(C_{6}H_{5})_{3}]_{2} + 6 H_{2}O

Salts of the anionic complex CoCl_{4}^{2−} can be prepared using tetraethylammonium chloride:

CoCl_{2} + 2 [(C_{2}H_{5})_{4}N]Cl → [(C_{2}H_{5})_{4}N)]_{2}[CoCl_{4}]

The tetrachlorocobaltate ion [CoCl_{4}]^{2−} is the blue ion that forms upon addition of hydrochloric acid to aqueous solutions of hydrated cobalt chloride, which are pink.

Treating anhydrous cobalt chloride with hydrogen fluoride gives cobalt(II) fluoride:

CoCl_{2} + 2 HF → CoF_{2} + 2 HCl

=== Precursor to organocobalt derivatives ===
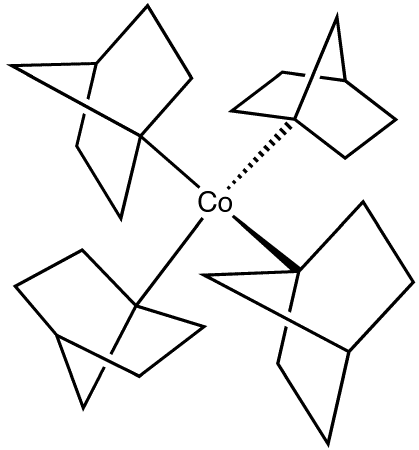
The structure of a cobalt(IV) coordination complex with the norbornyl anion

Reaction of the anhydrous compound with sodium cyclopentadienide gives cobaltocene Co(C_{5}H_{5})_{2}. Reaction of 1-norbornyllithium with the CoCl_{2}·THF produces tetrakis(1-norbornyl)cobalt(IV) — a rare example of a stable transition metal/saturated alkane compound, different products are obtained in other solvents.

== Moisture indication ==
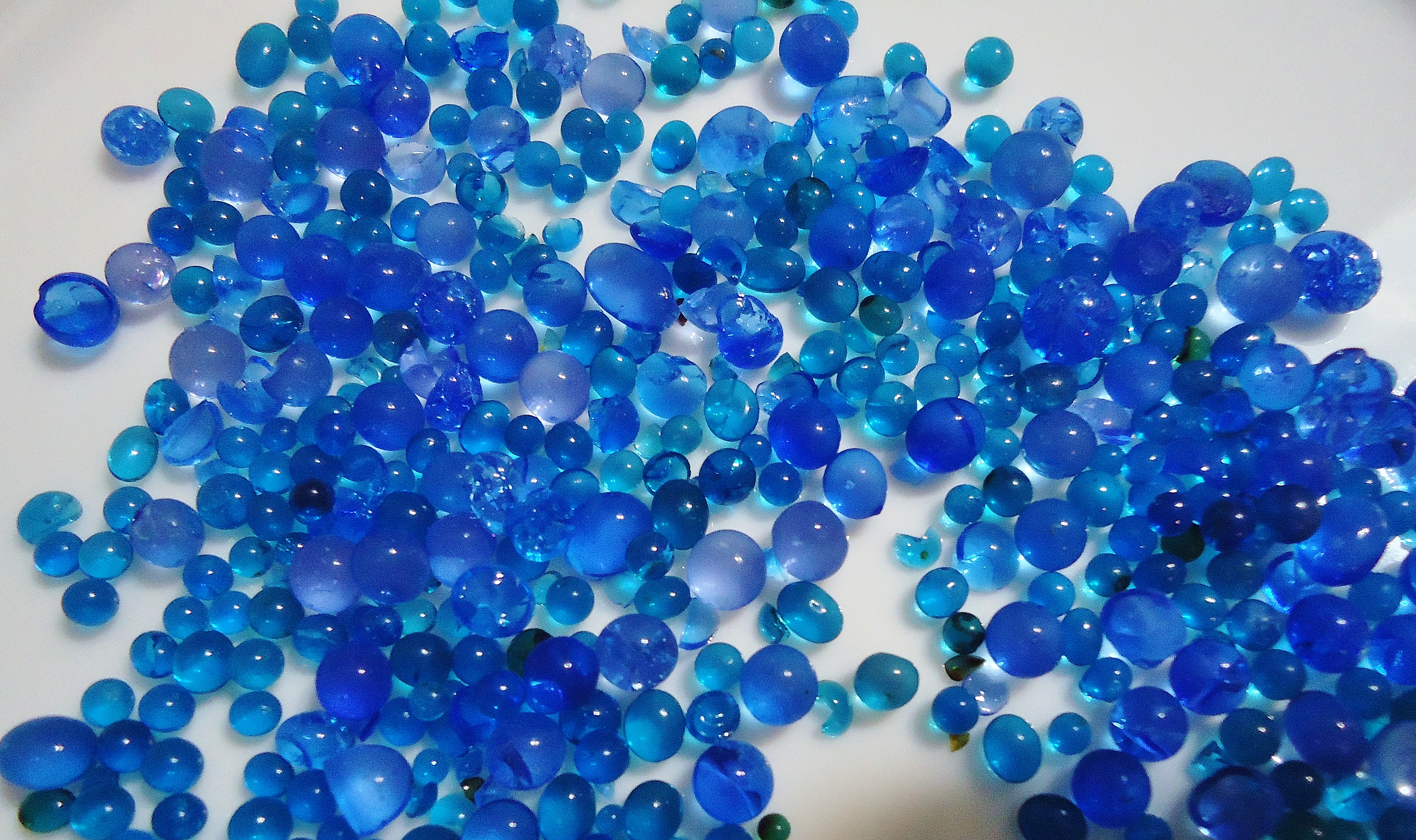
The deep blue colour of this moisture indicating silica gel is due to cobalt chloride. When hydrated the colour changes to a light pink/purple.

Cobalt chloride is a common visual moisture indicator due to its distinct colour change when hydrated. The colour change is from some shade of blue when dry, to a pink when hydrated, although the shade of colour depends on the substrate and concentration. It is impregnated into paper to make test strips for detecting moisture in solutions, or more slowly, in air/gas. Desiccants such as silica gel can incorporate cobalt chloride to indicate when it is "spent" (i.e. hydrated).

== Health issues ==
Cobalt is essential for most higher forms of life, but more than a few milligrams each day is harmful. Although poisonings have rarely resulted from cobalt compounds, their chronic ingestion has caused serious health problems at doses far less than the lethal dose. In 1966, the addition of cobalt compounds to stabilize beer foam in Canada led to a peculiar form of toxin-induced cardiomyopathy, which came to be known as beer drinker's cardiomyopathy.

Furthermore, cobalt(II) chloride is suspected of causing cancer (i.e., possibly carcinogenic, IARC Group 2B) as per the International Agency for Research on Cancer (IARC) Monographs.

In 2005–06, cobalt chloride was the eighth-most-prevalent allergen in patch tests (8.4%).

== Other uses ==
- Invisible ink: when suspended in solution, cobalt(II) chloride can be made to appear invisible on a surface; when that same surface is subsequently exposed to significant heat (such as from a handheld heat gun or lighter) the ink reversibly changes to blue.
- Cobalt chloride is an established chemical inducer of hypoxia-like responses such as erythropoiesis. Cobalt supplementation is not banned and therefore would not be detected by current anti-doping testing. Cobalt chloride is a banned substance under the Australian Thoroughbred Racing Board.
- Cobalt chloride is one method used to induce pulmonary arterial hypertension in animals for research and evaluation of treatment efficacy.
